= National Register of Historic Places listings in Jackson County, Iowa =

Location of Jackson County in Iowa

This is a list of the National Register of Historic Places listings in Jackson County, Iowa.

This is intended to be a complete list of the properties and districts on the National Register of Historic Places in Jackson County, Iowa, United States. Latitude and longitude coordinates are provided for many National Register properties and districts; these locations may be seen together in a map.

There are 76 properties and districts listed on the National Register in the county.

This National Park Service list is complete through NPS recent listings posted March 21, 2025.

== Current listings ==
	Name on the Register	Image	Date listed	Location	City or town	Description
1	D.H. Anderson Building		April 10, 1986 (#86000718)	129 S. Main St. 42°04′06″N 90°39′54″W	Maquoketa	
2	D.H. Anderson House	D.H. Anderson House	August 9, 1991 (#91000964)	315 E. Locust; 42°03′51″N 90°39′41″W	Maquoketa	
3	Bassnett-Nickerson House	Bassnett-Nickerson House	July 24, 1992 (#92000914)	116 S. Vermont; 42°04′04″N 90°40′24″W	Maquoketa	
4	Bellevue Commercial Historic District	Bellevue Commercial Historic District	April 11, 2022 (#100007558)	100 North Riverview–318 South Riverview Dr., 100 North 2nd–307 South 2nd, 102 Market–203 West Market, 103–15 State Sts. 42°15′30″N 90°25′28″W	Bellevue	
5	Bellevue Herald Building	Bellevue Herald Building	August 30, 1991 (#91001079)	130 S. Riverview St. 42°15′28″N 90°25′22″W	Bellevue	
6	Big Mill Homestead	Big Mill Homestead	August 30, 1991 (#91001075)	Paradise Valley Rd. west of Bellevue; 42°16′14″N 90°31′03″W	Bellevue	
7	Building at 101 North Riverview Street	Building at 101 North Riverview Street	August 30, 1991 (#91001068)	101 N. Riverview St. 42°15′32″N 90°25′22″W	Bellevue	
8	Building at 126 South Riverview Street	Building at 126 South Riverview Street	August 30, 1991 (#91001070)	126 S. Riverview St. 42°15′28″N 90°25′22″W	Bellevue	
9	Building at 130–132 North Riverview Street	Building at 130–132 North Riverview Street	August 30, 1991 (#91001069)	130–132 N. Riverview St. 42°15′33″N 90°25′24″W	Bellevue	
10	Building at 306 South Second Street	Building at 306 South Second Street	August 30, 1991 (#91001071)	306 S. 2nd St. 42°15′21″N 90°25′24″W	Bellevue	
11	Nathaniel Butterworth House	Nathaniel Butterworth House	July 24, 1992 (#92000909)	Eastern side of Iowa Highway 62 north of Andrew; 42°09′46″N 90°35′52″W	Andrew	
12	Canton School	Canton School	July 24, 1979 (#79000898)	South St. 42°09′47″N 90°53′46″W	Canton	
13	Central School	Central School	July 24, 1992 (#92000920)	Junction of Bellevue-Canton and Dubuque-Canton Rds. 42°10′24″N 90°51′15″W	Canton	
14	George Cooper House	George Cooper House	August 9, 1991 (#91000963)	413 W. Platt St. 42°04′07″N 90°40′11″W	Maquoketa	
15	Cundill Block	Cundill Block	August 9, 1991 (#89002112)	202 S. Main; 42°04′03″N 90°39′57″W	Maquoketa	
16	Decker House Hotel	Decker House Hotel	December 29, 1978 (#78003451)	128 N. Main St. 42°04′13″N 90°40′04″W	Maquoketa	
17	DeFries House, Barn and Carpenter Shop		July 24, 1992 (#92000910)	Eastern side of 232nd Ave., 255 feet south-west of its junction with 180th St. 42°11′18″N 90°37′18″W	Andrew	Limestone house, barn and carpenter shop
18	John S. Dominy House	John S. Dominy House	July 24, 1992 (#92000922)	605 Pearl St. 42°04′12″N 90°10′19″W	Sabula	
19	Dyas Hexagonal Barn	Dyas Hexagonal Barn	June 30, 1986 (#86001442)	U.S. Route 52; 42°13′57″N 90°24′20″W	Bellevue	
20	George Dyas House		August 30, 1991 (#91001077)	County Road Z-15 southwest of its junction with U.S. Route 52; 42°14′30″N 90°25′20″W	Bellevue	
21	William Dyas Barn	William Dyas Barn	August 30, 1991 (#91001078)	County Road Z-15 southwest of its junction with U.S. Route 52; 42°14′39″N 90°25′11″W	Bellevue	
22	First National Bank	First National Bank	August 9, 1991 (#89002108)	120 S. Main; 42°04′06″N 90°39′57″W	Maquoketa	
23	Fritz Chapel	Fritz Chapel	August 30, 1991 (#91001067)	Spruce Creek Rd. west of its junction with U.S. Route 52; 42°17′41″N 90°29′39″W	Bellevue	
24	Gehlen House and Barn	Gehlen House and Barn	June 18, 1979 (#79000901)	U.S. Route 52; 42°21′38″N 90°32′23″W	St. Donatus	
25	Milton Godard House	Milton Godard House	July 24, 1992 (#92000915)	Southern side of 7th St. southwest of Maquoketa; 42°02′21″N 90°44′07″W	Maquoketa	
26	Harris Wagon and Carriage Shop	Harris Wagon and Carriage Shop	July 24, 1992 (#92000917)	Junction of Main and Pine Sts. 42°17′44″N 90°37′16″W	La Motte	
27	Hotel Hurst	Hotel Hurst	December 27, 1989 (#89002105)	227 S. Main; 42°04′00″N 90°39′54″W	Maquoketa	
28	Hotel Hurst Garage		December 27, 1989 (#89002109)	219 S. Main; 42°04′01″N 90°39′54″W	Maquoketa	
29	House at 505 Court Street	House at 505 Court Street	August 30, 1991 (#91001073)	505 Court St. 42°15′24″N 90°25′42″W	Bellevue	
30	House at 111 E. Maple Street	House at 111 E. Maple Street	August 9, 1991 (#91000959)	111 E. Maple St. 42°03′56″N 90°39′54″W	Maquoketa	
31	A.A. Hurst House	A.A. Hurst House	August 9, 1991 (#91000960)	513 W. Platt St. 42°04′08″N 90°40′16″W	Maquoketa	
32	Hurstville Historic District	Hurstville Historic District	December 3, 1979 (#79000900)	North of Maquoketa on U.S. Route 61; 42°05′38″N 90°40′55″W	Maquoketa	
33	Insane Asylum at the County Poor Farm	Insane Asylum at the County Poor Farm	July 24, 1992 (#92000918)	Eastern side of County Road Y61 (250th Ave.) north of Andrew; 42°11′56″N 90°36′36″W	Andrew	
34	IOOF Building	IOOF Building	August 9, 1991 (#89002110)	103 N. Main; 42°04′09″N 90°39′54″W	Maquoketa	
35	Jackson County Courthouse	Jackson County Courthouse	July 2, 1981 (#81000248)	Bounded by 3rd, State, 4th, and Court Sts. 42°15′27″N 90°25′34″W	Bellevue	
36	Jackson County Jail	Jackson County Jail	December 12, 1978 (#78001224)	Emmet St. 42°09′15″N 90°35′29″W	Andrew	
37	Mrs. Lydia Johnson House	Mrs. Lydia Johnson House	August 9, 1991 (#91000966)	209 E. Locust; 42°03′51″N 90°39′47″W	Maquoketa	
38	Kegler Gonner Store and Post Office	Kegler Gonner Store and Post Office	June 27, 1985 (#85001375)	100 E. Main; 42°09′50″N 90°28′35″W	Springbrook	
39	Kucheman Building	Kucheman Building	August 30, 1991 (#91001072)	100 N. 2nd St. 42°15′30″N 90°25′28″W	Bellevue	
40	John Lake House	John Lake House	December 30, 1991 (#91000969)	601 W. Platt St. 42°04′06″N 90°40′19″W	Maquoketa	
41	Lock and Dam No. 12 Historic District	Lock and Dam No. 12 Historic District	March 10, 2004 (#04000172)	401 N. Riverview St. 42°15′41″N 90°25′22″W	Bellevue	
42	Henry Lubben House, Smokehouse and Springhouse		July 24, 1992 (#92000919)	Western side of County Road Y34 north of Baldwin; 42°05′38″N 90°50′26″W	Baldwin	
43	Lyon Block	Lyon Block	August 9, 1991 (#89002104)	112-116 N. Main; 42°04′11″N 90°39′57″W	Maquoketa	
44	Maquoketa Caves State Park Historic District	Maquoketa Caves State Park Historic District	December 23, 1991 (#91001843)	County Road 428 northwest of Maquoketa; 42°07′05″N 90°46′28″W	Maquoketa	
45	Maquoketa Commercial Historic District	Maquoketa Commercial Historic District	May 18, 2022 (#100007559)	Main St. between Quarry and Maple Sts., including Platt and Pleasant Sts. one block east and west of Main St. 42°04′09″N 90°39′56″W	Maquoketa	
46	Maquoketa Company-Clinton Machine Company Administration Building	Maquoketa Company-Clinton Machine Company Administration Building	August 23, 2006 (#06000712)	605 E. Maple St. 42°03′59″N 90°39′33″W	Maquoketa	
47	Maquoketa Free Public Library	Maquoketa Free Public Library	December 27, 1989 (#89002102)	2nd and Pleasant; 42°04′04″N 90°40′01″W	Maquoketa	
48	Dr. G.S. Martin House	Dr. G.S. Martin House	December 30, 1991 (#91000967)	311 S. 2nd St. 42°03′54″N 90°39′59″W	Maquoketa	
49	Merrero Building	Merrero Building	August 9, 1991 (#89002107)	111-115 S. Main; 42°04′07″N 90°39′54″W	Maquoketa	
50	Mill Rock School	Mill Rock School	July 24, 1992 (#92000913)	Western side of 153rd Ave., south of Baldwin; 42°03′31″N 90°50′21″W	Baldwin	
51	Mitchell-Maskrey Mill	Mitchell-Maskrey Mill	August 9, 1991 (#89002111)	120 E. Pleasant; 42°04′04″N 90°39′52″W	Maquoketa	
52	New Era Building	New Era Building	August 9, 1991 (#89002103)	115-117 E. Platt; 42°04′08″N 90°39′53″W	Maquoketa	
53	Theodore Niemann House and Spring House		August 30, 1991 (#91001065)	Spruce Creek Rd. west of its junction with U.S. Route 52; 42°17′35″N 90°29′28″W	Bellevue	
54	Alexander Organ House	Alexander Organ House	August 9, 1991 (#91000968)	607 W. Summit; 42°03′42″N 90°40′22″W	Maquoketa	
55	Paradise Farm	Paradise Farm	July 13, 1977 (#77000520)	West of Bellevue; 42°16′10″N 90°29′04″W	Bellevue	
56	Perham House	Perham House	August 9, 1991 (#91000961)	213 E. Pleasant St. 42°04′03″N 90°39′48″W	Maquoketa	
57	Polygonal Barn, Van Buren Township		June 30, 1986 (#86001443)	Iowa Highway 64; 42°03′09″N 90°21′34″W	Van Buren Township	
58	E.G. Potter's Jasper Flour Mill	E.G. Potter's Jasper Flour Mill	April 19, 1984 (#84001257)	South and 2nd St. 42°15′03″N 90°25′36″W	Bellevue	
59	Robb House and Spring House	Robb House and Spring House	August 30, 1991 (#91001076)	Paradise Valley Rd. west of Bellevue; 42°16′52″N 90°32′33″W	Bellevue	
60	Henry Roling House	Henry Roling House	August 30, 1991 (#91001066)	Spruce Creek Rd. west of its junction with U.S. Route 52; 42°17′30″N 90°28′42″W	Bellevue	
61	St. Lawrence Catholic Church	St. Lawrence Catholic Church	July 24, 1992 (#92000912)	Bellevue-Cascade Rd. (County Road D61) west of its junction with U.S. Route 61; 42°14′26″N 90°41′42″W	Otter Creek	
62	St. Patrick's Church-Garryowen	St. Patrick's Church-Garryowen	July 24, 1992 (#92000921)	W. Bellevue-Cascade Rd. (County Road D61) west of Garryowen; 42°17′07″N 90°50′50″W	Garryowen	
63	C.M. Sanborn Building	C.M. Sanborn Building	August 9, 1991 (#89002106)	203 S. Main; 42°04′02″N 90°39′54″W	Maquoketa	
64	Savanna-Sabula Bridge	Savanna-Sabula Bridge	August 27, 1999 (#99001033)	U.S. Route 52/Iowa Highway 64 over the Mississippi River; 42°06′14″N 90°10′01″W	Sabula	Extends into Carroll County, Illinois
65	Mrs. Margaret Sieben House		July 24, 1992 (#92000916)	0.3 miles east of County Road Y34 north of Baldwin; 42°05′21″N 90°50′09″W	Baldwin	
66	Thomas Slye House		July 24, 1992 (#92000911)	Southern side of 184th St. east of its junction with Iowa Highway 62; 42°11′29″N 90°36′15″W	Andrew	
67	Spring Side	Spring Side	December 28, 1990 (#90001955)	Junction of U.S. Route 52 and Ensign Rd. 42°16′13″N 90°26′00″W	Bellevue	
68	J.E. Squiers House	J.E. Squiers House	April 20, 1995 (#95000385)	418 W. Pleasant St. 42°04′05″N 90°40′16″W	Maquoketa	
69	W.B. Swigert House	W.B. Swigert House	August 9, 1991 (#91000965)	309 N. Main St. 42°04′17″N 90°39′54″W	Maquoketa	
70	Henry Taubman House	Henry Taubman House	August 9, 1991 (#91000962)	303 E. Pleasant St. 42°04′03″N 90°39′43″W	Maquoketa	
71	Upper Paradise	Upper Paradise	August 30, 1991 (#91001074)	Paradise Valley Rd. west of Bellevue; 42°16′24″N 90°30′20″W	Bellevue	
72	Village of St. Donatus Historic District	Village of St. Donatus Historic District	November 8, 1989 (#89001870)	Junction of U.S. Route 52/Main St. and 1st St. 42°21′42″N 90°32′26″W	St. Donatus	
73	West Pleasant Street Historic District	West Pleasant Street Historic District	August 9, 1991 (#91000970)	Pleasant St. between 2nd and Prospect Sts. 42°04′04″N 90°40′11″W	Maquoketa	
74	Seneca Williams Mill	Seneca Williams Mill	September 1, 1976 (#76000774)	East of Maquoketa on Iowa Highway 64; 42°04′05″N 90°38′44″W	Maquoketa	
75	Anson Wilson House		November 17, 1977 (#77000521)	South of Maquoketa off U.S. Route 61; 42°03′02″N 90°40′39″W	Maquoketa	
76	Jeremiah Wood House	Jeremiah Wood House	November 10, 1982 (#82000409)	802 River St. 42°04′05″N 90°10′14″W	Sabula	

== Former listings ==
	Name on the Register	Image	Date listed	Date removed	Location	City or town	Description
1	Chicago, Milwaukee & St. Paul Narrow Gauge Depot-LaMotte	Chicago, Milwaukee & St. Paul Narrow Gauge Depot-LaMotte	February 17, 1995 (#95000105)	September 8, 2022	Market St. 42°17′32″N 90°37′22″W	La Motte	Building was moved to Maquoketa.

== See also ==
- List of National Historic Landmarks in Iowa
- National Register of Historic Places listings in Iowa
- Listings in neighboring counties: Carroll (IL), Clinton, Dubuque, Jo Daviess (IL), Jones
