= Polygonal Barn, Van Buren Township =

- U.S. National Register of Historic Places
- Location within Iowa Location within the United States
- Location: Iowa Highway 64; Van Buren Township
- Coordinates: 42°03′01″N 90°20′48″W
- Area: less than one acre
- Built: 1920
- Built by: Gus Klenney
- MPS: Iowa Round Barns: The Sixty Year Experiment TR
- NRHP reference No.: 86001443
- Added to NRHP: June 30, 1986

The Polygonal Barn, Van Buren Township was a historic building located near the town of Miles, located in Van Buren Township in rural Jackson County, Iowa, United States. It was built in 1920 by Gus Klenney as a sale barn. They house livestock that are shown and sold to buyers. It is not known what livestock were sold here. The building was octagonal in shape and measured 50 feet (15 m) in diameter. It was listed on the National Register of Historic Places in 1986. The structure has subsequently been torn down.
