= Building at 126 South Riverview Street =

- U.S. National Register of Historic Places
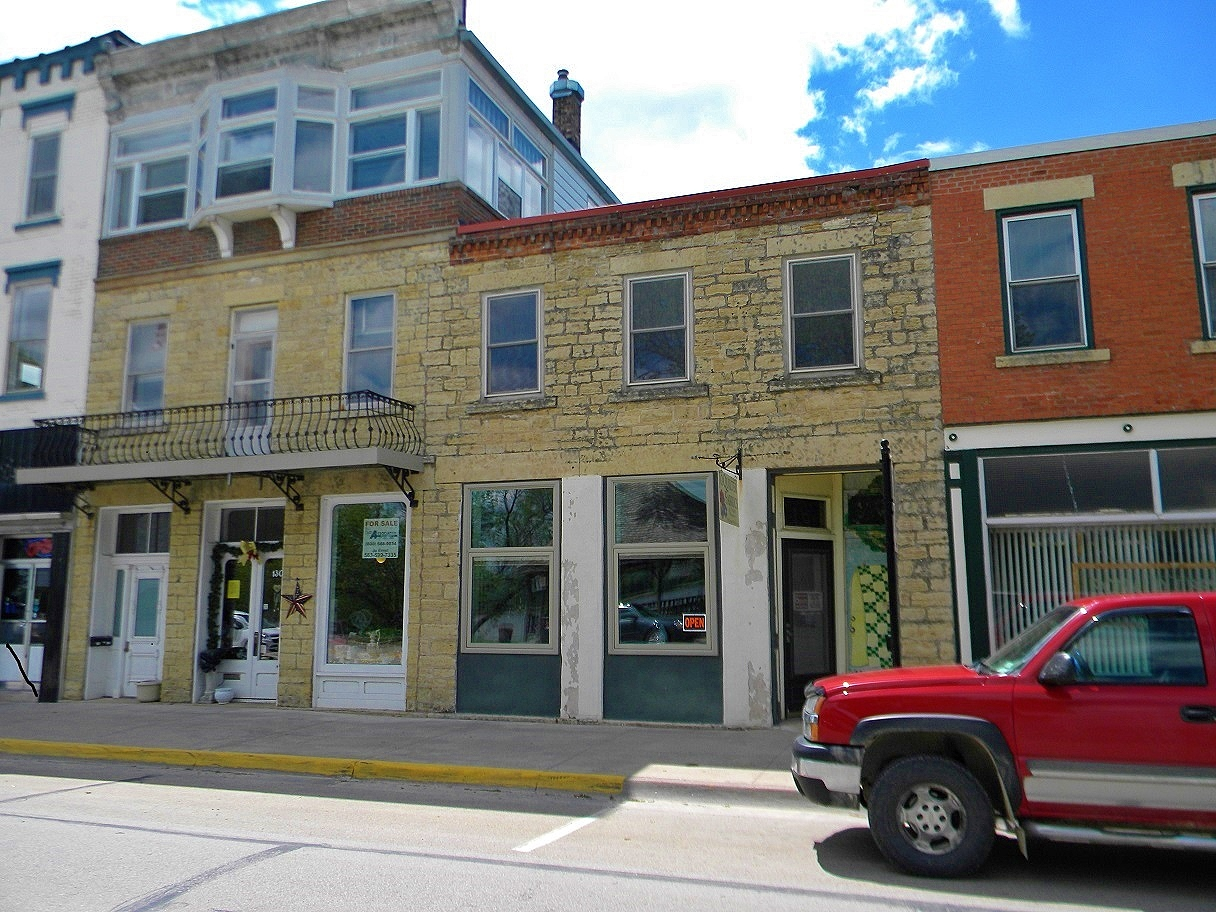
- 126 S. Riverview St. is the two-story stone building on the right

- Location within Iowa Location within the United States
- Location: 126 S. Riverview St. Bellevue, Iowa
- Coordinates: 42°15′29″N 90°25′23″W
- Area: less than one acre
- Built: 1855
- Architectural style: Vernacular
- MPS: Limestone Architecture of Jackson County MPS
- NRHP reference No.: 91001070
- Added to NRHP: August 30, 1991

The Building at 126 South Riverview Street is a historic commercial building located in Bellevue, Iowa, United States. It is one of over 217 limestone structures in Jackson County from the mid-19th century, of which 20 are commercial buildings. The two-floor structure was built around 1855 to house a retail establishment, but its original use has not been determined. The stone blocks that were used in its construction vary somewhat in shape and size, and they were laid in courses. The rectangular plan structure features three narrow bays, a recessed entrance in the right bay, dressed stone lintels, and a stone storefront. The window openings have been altered. The building was listed on the National Register of Historic Places in 1991.
