= John S. Dominy House =

Historic house in Iowa, United States

- U.S. National Register of Historic Places
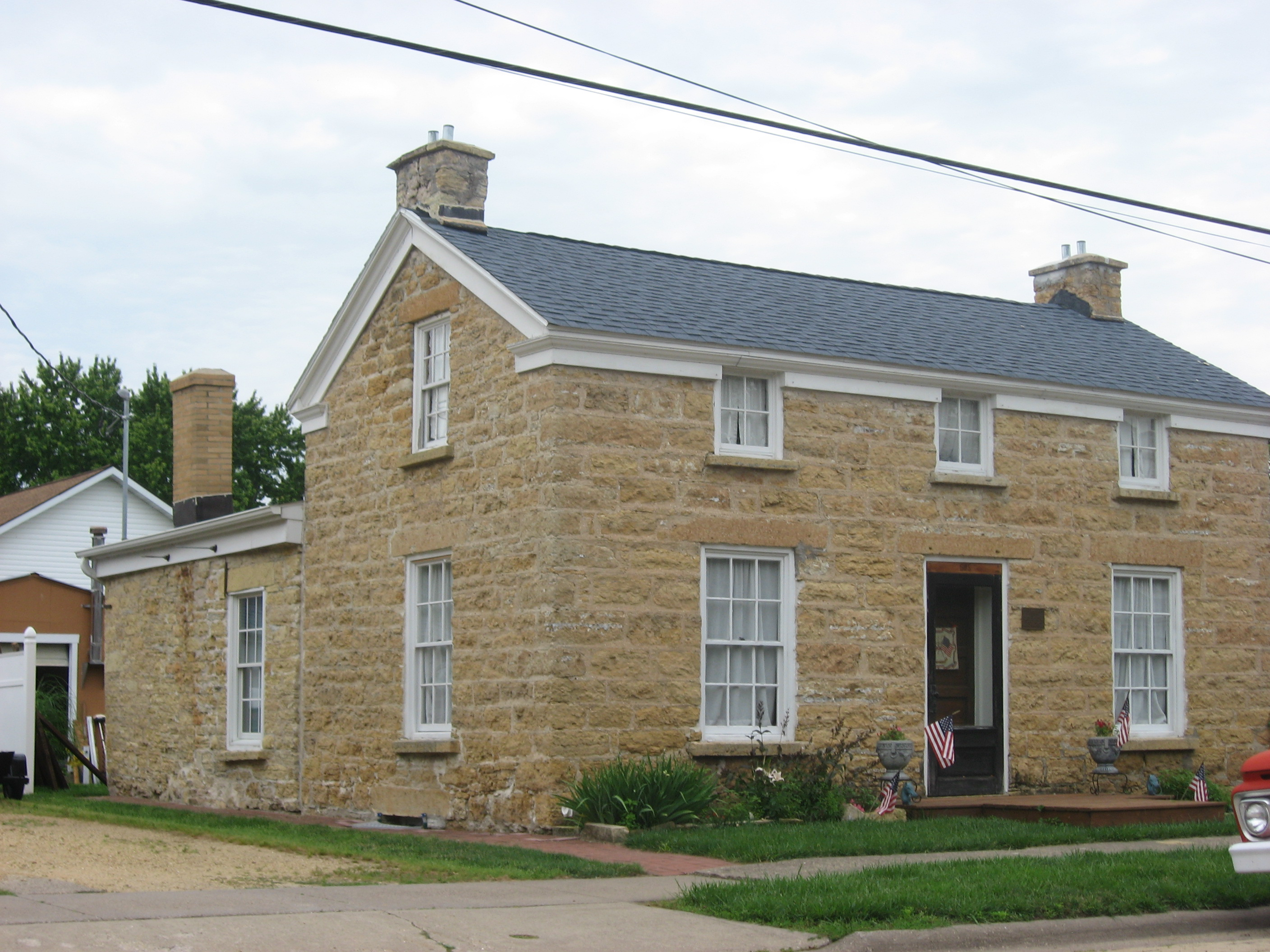

- Location within Iowa Location within the United States
- Location: 605 Pearl St., Sabula, Iowa
- Coordinates: 42°04′12″N 90°10′19″W
- Area: less than one acre
- Built: c. 1850-60
- Architectural style: Vernacular
- MPS: Limestone Architecture of Jackson County MPS
- NRHP reference No.: 92000922
- Added to NRHP: July 24, 1992

The John S. Dominy House is a historic house located at 605 Pearl Street in Sabula, Iowa.

== Description and history ==
Built sometime between 1850 and 1860, the 1½-story vernacular stone house features a symmetrical, three-bay-wide, facade on the eave side, and a single-story wing in the back. While one of the very few stone buildings in Sabula, it is an example of the common type of stone house found in Jackson County. John S. Dominy, who is associated with this house, built the first blacksmith shop in town. The person who designed and built this house is not known.

It was listed on the National Register of Historic Places on July 24, 1992.
