= W.B. Swigert House =

Historic house in Iowa, United States

- U.S. National Register of Historic Places
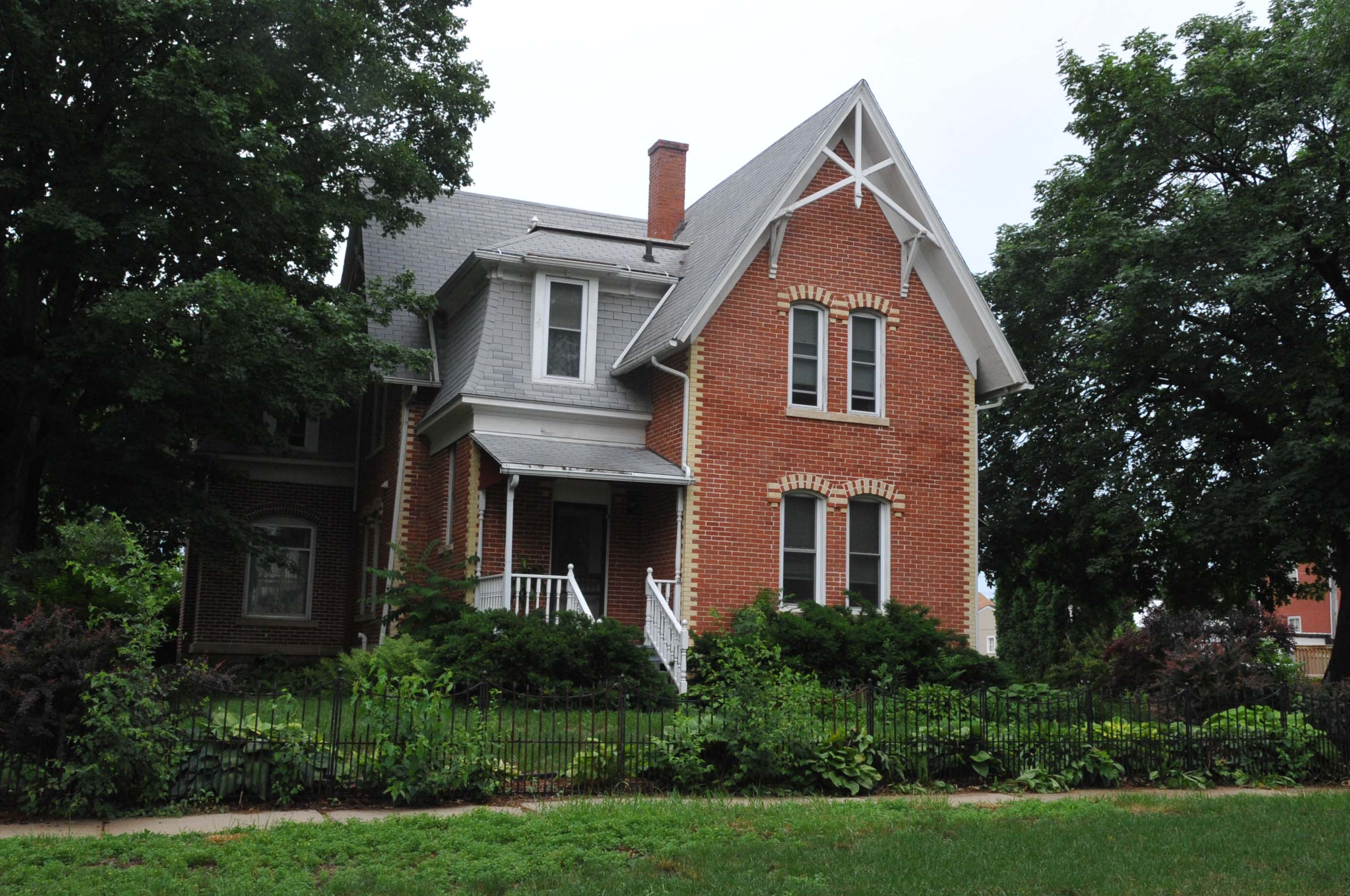

- Location within Iowa Location within the United States
- Location: 309 N. Main St. Maquoketa, Iowa
- Coordinates: 42°04′17″N 90°39′54″W
- Area: less than one acre
- Built: 1885
- Architectural style: Late Victorian
- MPS: Maquoketa MPS
- NRHP reference No.: 91000965
- Added to NRHP: August 9, 1991

The W.B. Swigert House is a historic residence located in Maquoketa, Iowa, United States. This is one of several Victorian houses in Maquoketa that are noteworthy for their quoined corners, a rare architectural feature in Iowa. Built around 1896, the 2½-story brick house follows a rectangular plan with cross gable wings. It features a gambrel dormer, Stick Style trusses on the gable and gambrel, and a one-story polygonal bay window. The Swigert family was associated with a successful local newspaper called the Maquoketa Sentinel. This house was one of many houses built during Maquoketa's economic expansion in the late 19th century. It was listed on the National Register of Historic Places in 1991.
