= Milton Godard House =

Historic house in Iowa, United States

- U.S. National Register of Historic Places
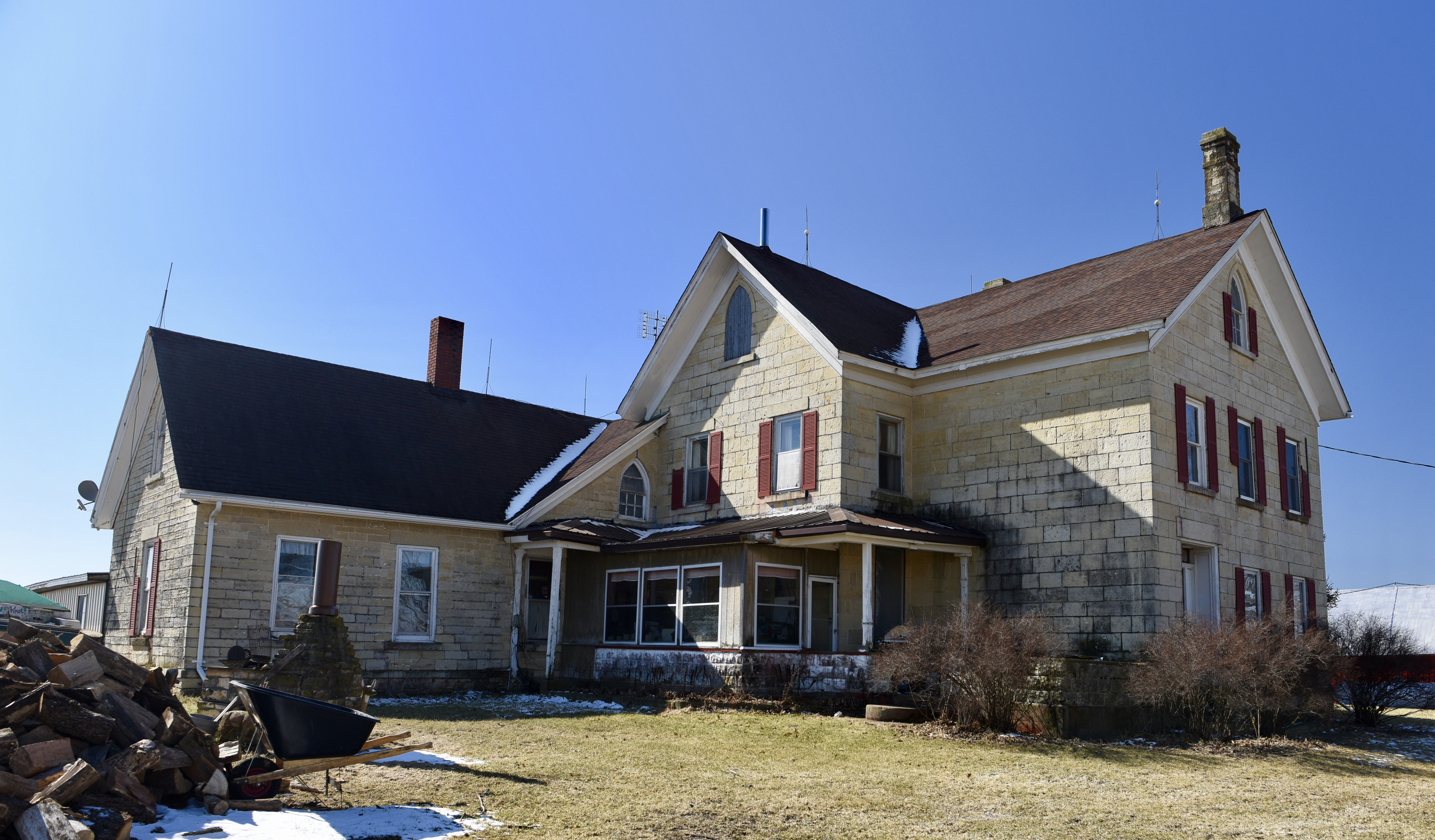

- Location within Iowa Location within the United States
- Location: Southern side of 7th St. southwest of Maquoketa
- Coordinates: 42°02′21″N 90°44′07″W
- Area: less than one acre
- Built: 1860, 1866
- Architectural style: Gothic Revival
- MPS: Limestone Architecture of Jackson County MPS
- NRHP reference No.: 92000915
- Added to NRHP: July 24, 1992

The Milton Godard House is a historic building located southwest of Maquoketa, Iowa, United States. This house is considered an excellent example of limestone craftsmanship and design. It is one of over 217 limestone structures in Jackson County from the mid-19th century, of which 101 are houses. Very few are in this part of the county, and most are vernacular construction. The Godard house has elements on the Gothic Revival style, especially in the fenestrations. It is also unusual in that it is two different houses built at two different times. Local tradition says that five stonemasons from Germany were brought here to work on the house, and they stayed here for eight years until it was completed. Godard was a Connecticut native who settled here in 1845. His closest neighbors to the south and west at that time were 15 miles (24 km) away. He donated land to the east of his house in the 1880s for a Methodist church. The church was razed in 1926, but the cemetery remains. The house was listed on the National Register of Historic Places in 1992.
