= Perham House =

Historic house in Iowa, United States

- U.S. National Register of Historic Places
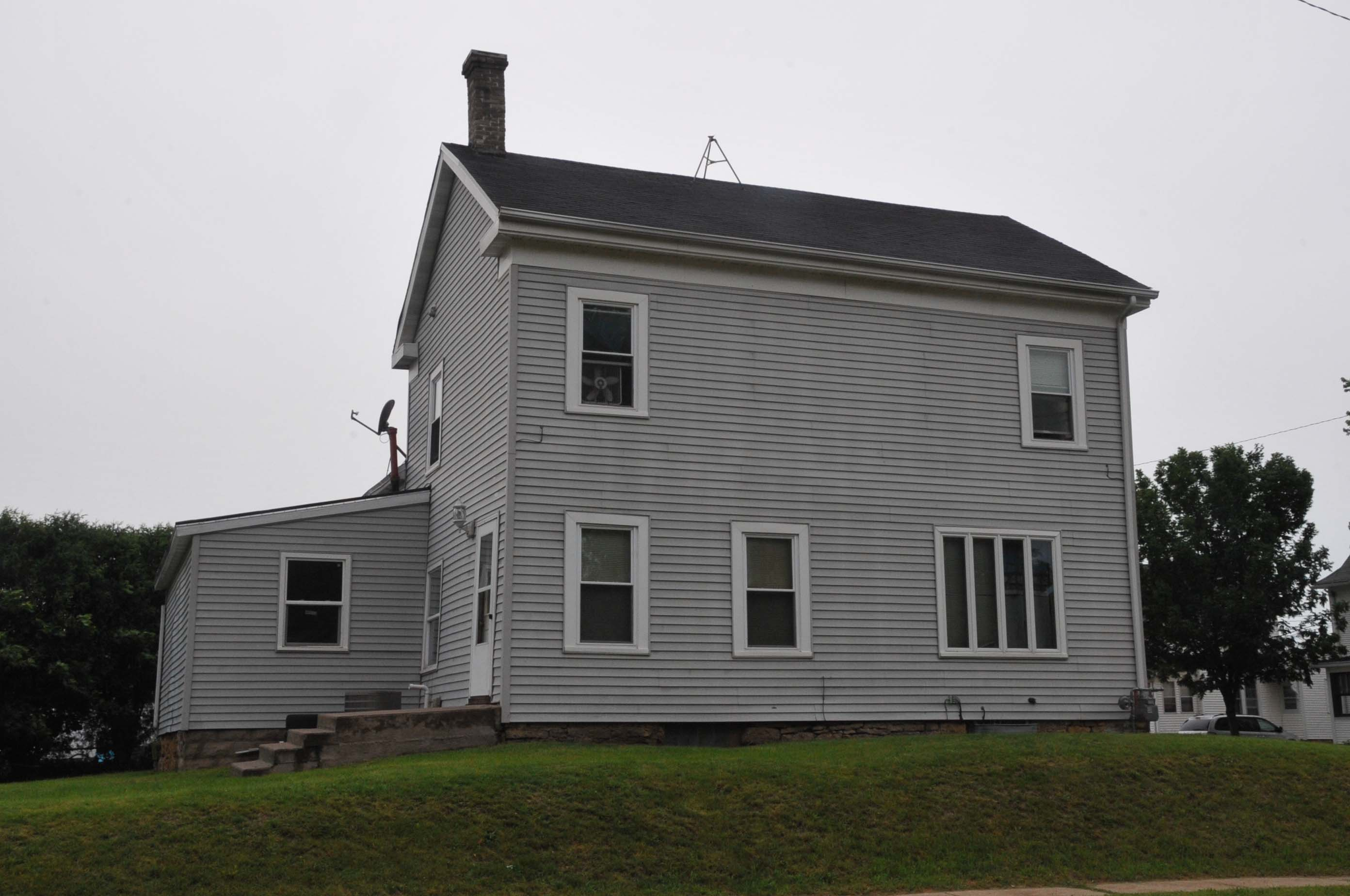

- Location within Iowa Location within the United States
- Location: 213 E. Pleasant St. Maquoketa, Iowa
- Coordinates: 42°04′03″N 90°39′48″W
- Area: less than one acre
- Built: 1859
- Architectural style: Greek Revival
- MPS: Maquoketa MPS
- NRHP reference No.: 91000961
- Added to NRHP: August 9, 1991

The Perham House is a historic residence located in Maquoketa, Iowa, United States. This is one of five Greek Revival houses in Maquoketa that represent its earliest extant houses built during its early growth period. Built about 1859, the two-story frame house features a gable roof, full entablature creating a triangular pediment, pilastered corners, and a small wing on the west side. Russell Perham was a New York native who settled in Maquoketa in 1858, and bought this property a year later. It is not known if he had the house built or not. However, the Perham family did own it until Charlotte, his widow, sold the house in 1908. Russell Perham was engaged in the mercantile and milling business, and served as the Justice of the Peace. The house was listed on the National Register of Historic Places in 1991.
