= Robb House and Spring House =

Historic house in Iowa, United States

- U.S. National Register of Historic Places
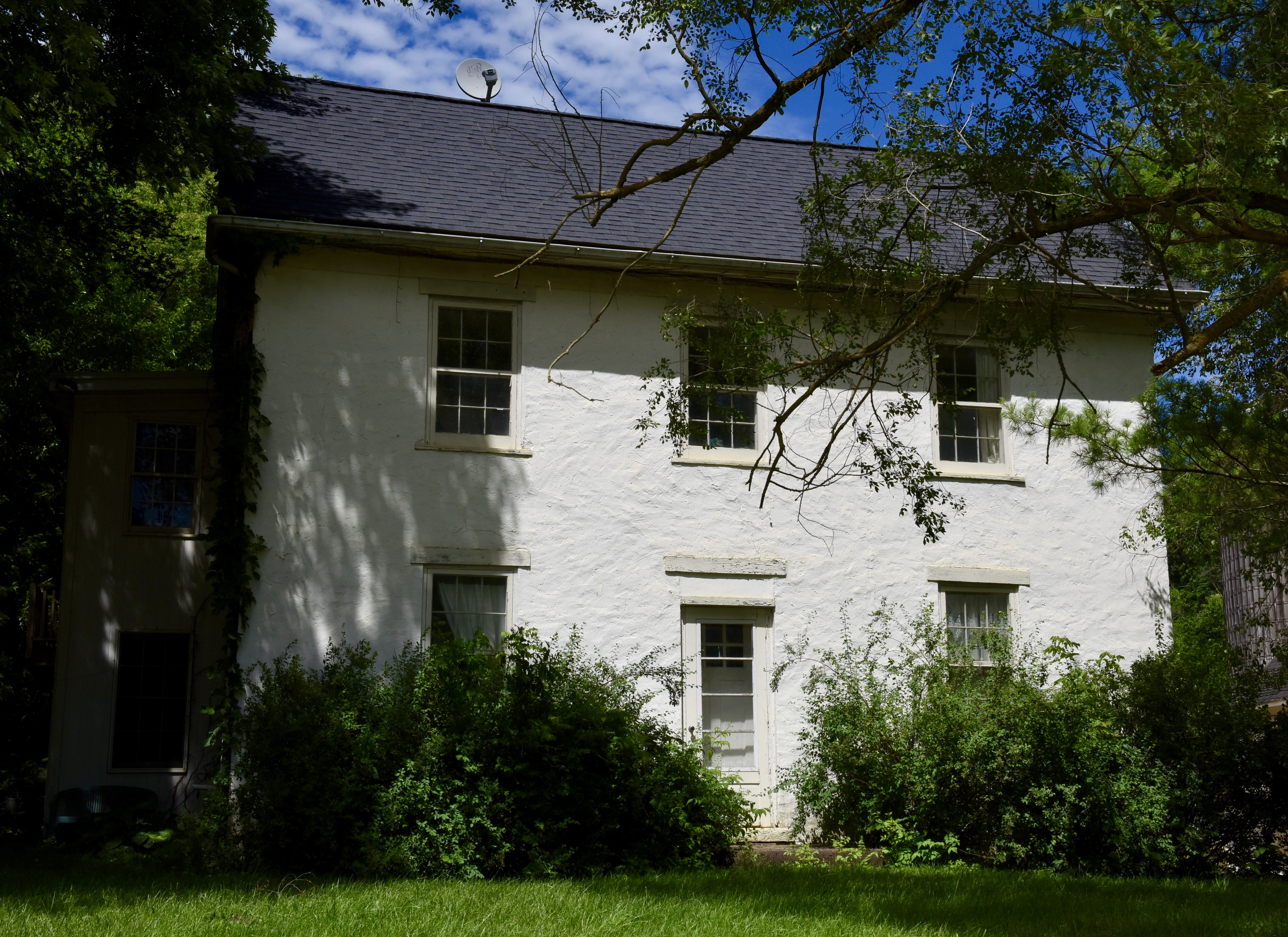

- Location within Iowa Location within the United States
- Location: Paradise Valley Rd. west of Bellevue
- Coordinates: 42°16′52″N 90°32′33″W
- Area: less than one acre
- Built: 1855
- Architectural style: Vernacular
- MPS: Limestone Architecture of Jackson County MPS
- NRHP reference No.: 91001076
- Added to NRHP: August 30, 1991

The Robb House and Spring House are historic buildings located west of Bellevue, Iowa, United States. They are two of over 217 limestone structures in Jackson County from the mid-19th century, of which 101 are houses. The residence is similar to most of the other houses in that it is a two-story structure that follows a rectangular plan, a symmetrical three bay facade, and is capped with a gable roof. It differs from most of the others in that it has heavy timbers for the lintels rather than stone, and it was stuccoed. The stucco may have been influenced by the Luxembourgian houses in the region. The small, single-story, spring house appears to be from the same time period as the residence. It is square and capped with a hip roof. They are believed to have been designed for John Robb by Elbridge G. Potter, who settled along the Big Mill Creek in 1842, an area he called "Paradise Valley." The buildings were listed together on the National Register of Historic Places in 1991.
