= Seneca Williams Mill =

Historic place in Iowa, United States

- U.S. National Register of Historic Places
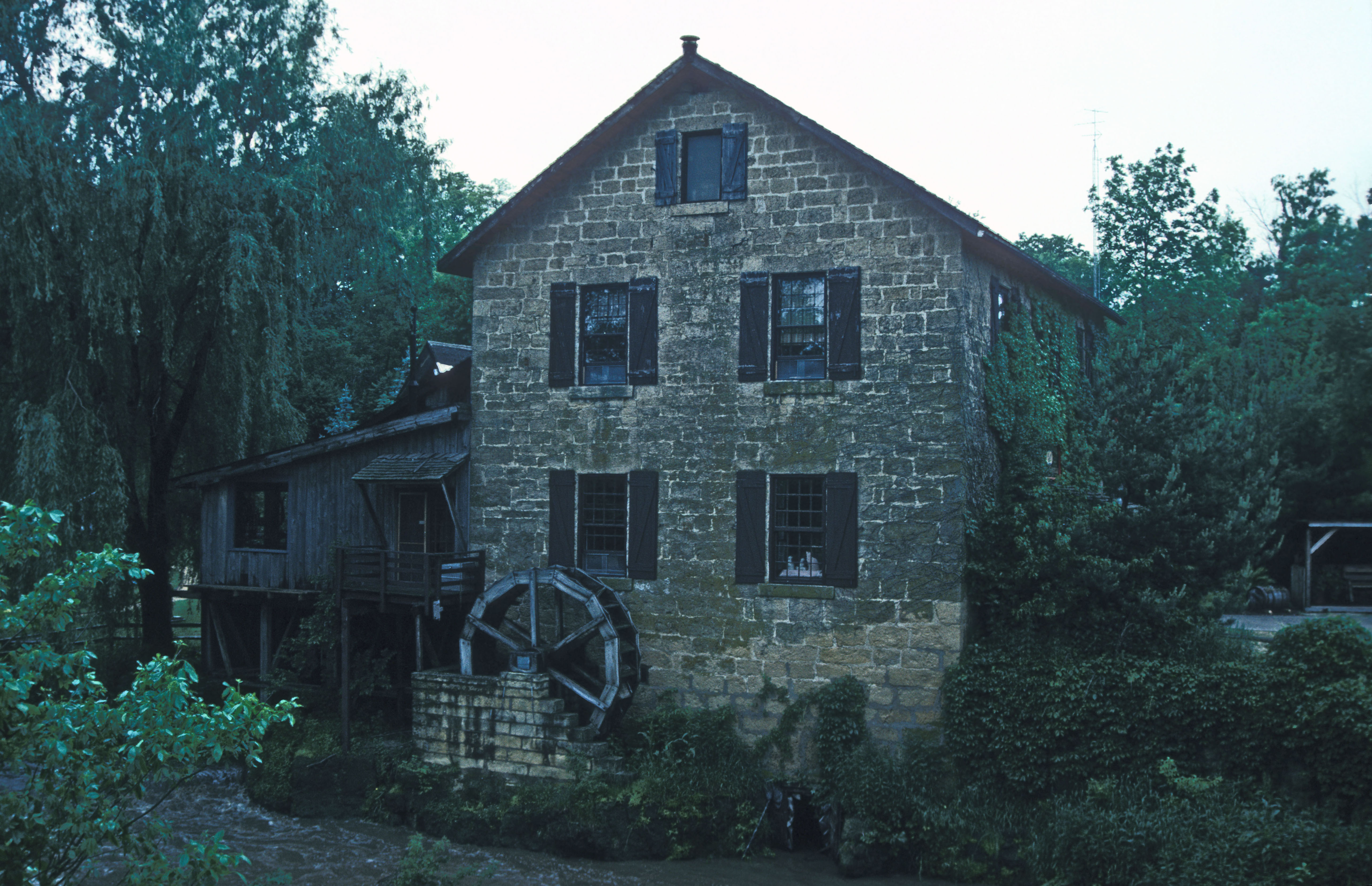

- Location within Iowa Location within the United States
- Location: East of Maquoketa on Iowa Highway 64
- Coordinates: 42°03′55″N 90°38′25″W
- Area: less than one acre
- Built: 1867
- Built by: Joseph Willey
- NRHP reference No.: 76000774
- Added to NRHP: September 1, 1976

Seneca Williams Mill is a historic building located just outside of Maquoketa, Iowa, United States. Originally known as Oakland Mill, it was built by Joseph Willey in 1867. The 2½-story stone building has a partial basement and is capped with a gable roof. A water-powered turbine, still extant, supplied the power to operate the mill. The location of the mill race can still be seen on the east side of the property, and permanents of the damn remain in Prairie Creek. None of the mill workings remain on the inside. Willey sold the mill to Seneca Williams in 1867, and he operated in until 1904. The building was converted into a barn in 1920. The building was listed on the National Register of Historic Places in 1976. Wildlife artist Patrick J. Costello used the old mill as a residence and studio from 1979 to 2006. His daughter Tracy Costello Taylor has operated it since as a reception hall.
