= Henry Taubman House =

Historic house in Iowa, United States

- U.S. National Register of Historic Places
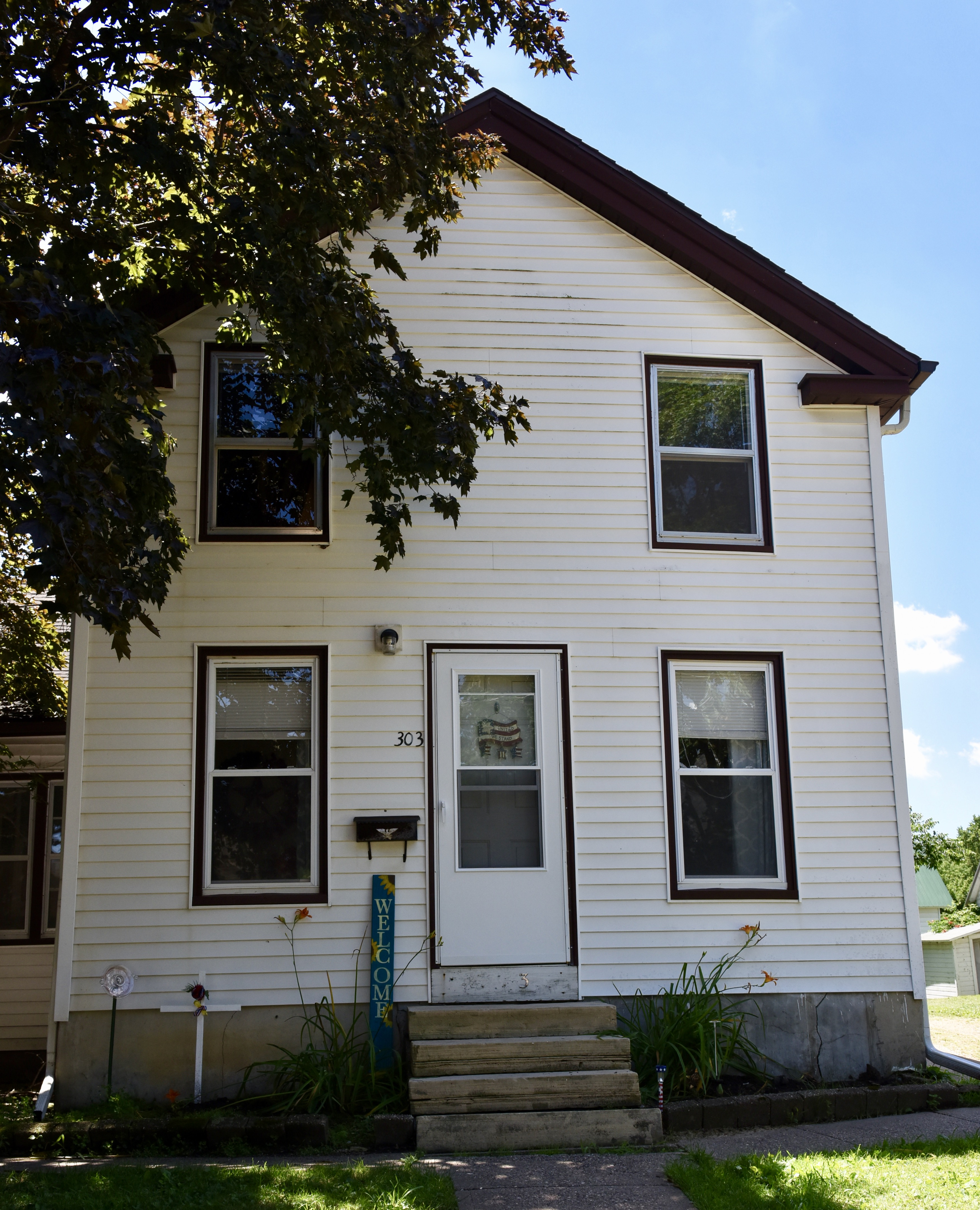

- Location within Iowa Location within the United States
- Location: 303 E. Pleasant St. Maquoketa, Iowa
- Coordinates: 42°04′03″N 90°39′43″W
- Area: less than one acre
- Built: 1854
- Architectural style: Greek Revival
- MPS: Maquoketa MPS
- NRHP reference No.: 91000962
- Added to NRHP: August 9, 1991

The Henry Taubman House is a historic residence located in Maquoketa, Iowa, United States. This Greek Revival house represents the earliest extant houses in Maquoketa that were built during its early growth period. Built in 1854, the two-story frame house features a gable roof, cornice returns, pilasters, and a single-story wing on the east side. This house is one of five left in Maquoketa in the Greek Revival style. It was listed on the National Register of Historic Places in 1991.
