= A.A. Hurst House =

Historic house in Iowa, United States

- U.S. National Register of Historic Places
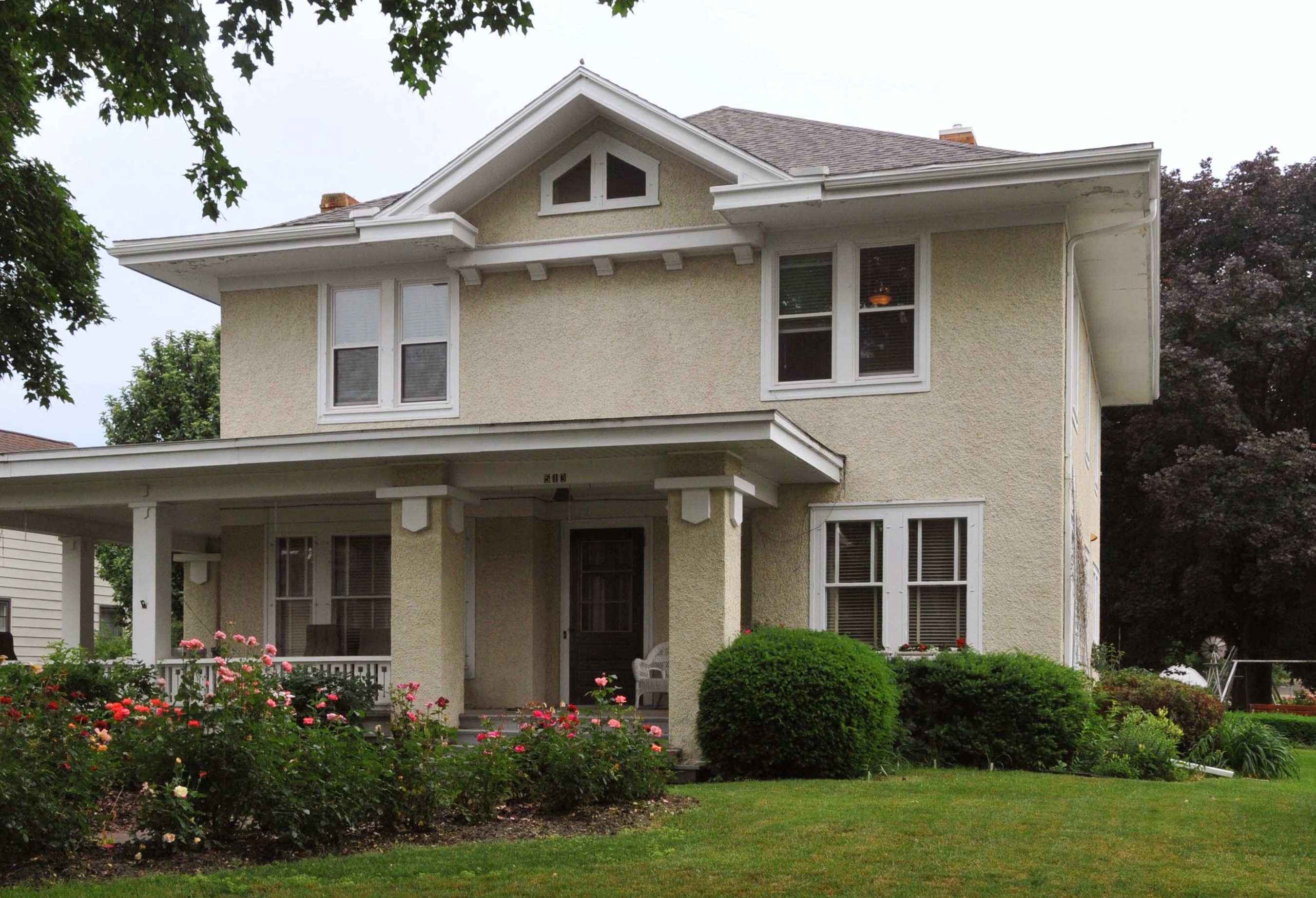

- Location within Iowa Location within the United States
- Location: 513 W. Platt St. Maquoketa, Iowa
- Coordinates: 42°04′08″N 90°40′16″W
- Area: less than one acre
- Built: 1912
- Architect: E.G. Holbrook
- Architectural style: Prairie School
- MPS: Maquoketa MPS
- NRHP reference No.: 91000960
- Added to NRHP: August 9, 1991

The A.A. Hurst House is a historic residence located in Maquoketa, Iowa, United States. This house shows the strongest influences of the Prairie School style in town. It was built on the site of a previous house at a time when newer and larger houses were replacing Maquoketa's older buildings. It was designed by Davenport architect E.G. Holbrook. The two-story house features a low pitched hip roof, broad eaves, paired windows, banded windows in groups, a stuccoed exterior, and a broad porch. Abe A. Hurst was the son of Alfred Hurst, who founded the A. Hurst and Company Lime Works and the company town of Hurstville. In addition to the family business, they were also involved with Maquoketa Electric Light and Power Company. This connection allowed Abe to be involved with the construction of Lakehurst, a hydro dam and power plant, in 1923. The house was listed on the National Register of Historic Places in 1991.
