= Big Mill Homestead =

Historic house in Iowa, United States

- U.S. National Register of Historic Places
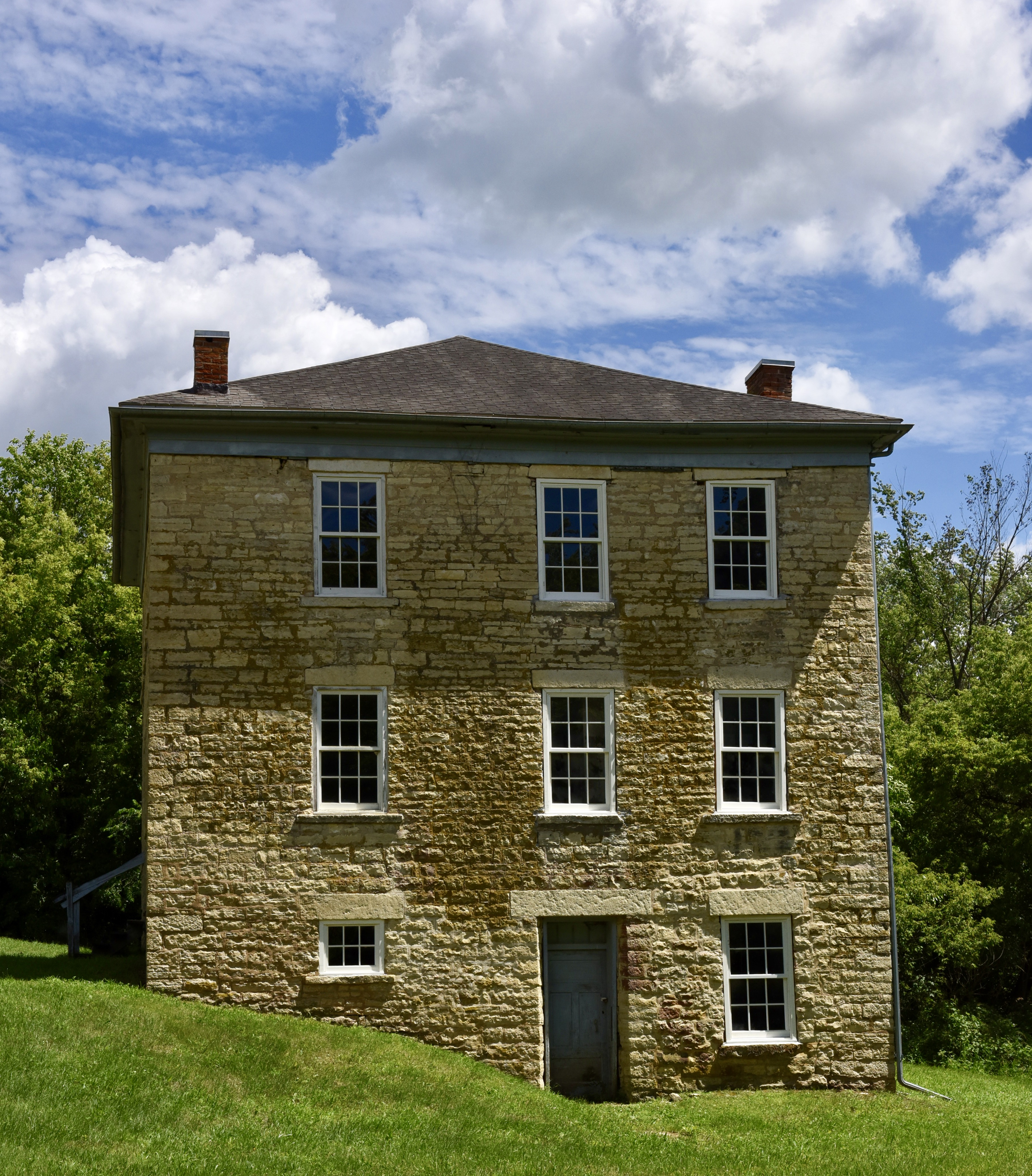

- Location within Iowa Location within the United States
- Location: Paradise Valley Rd. west of Bellevue
- Coordinates: 42°16′15″N 90°31′03″W
- Area: less than one acre
- Built: 1850
- Architectural style: Vernacular
- MPS: Limestone Architecture of Jackson County MPS
- NRHP reference No.: 91001075
- Added to NRHP: August 30, 1991

Big Mill Homestead is a historic residence located west of Bellevue, Iowa, United States. It is one of over 217 limestone structures in Jackson County from the mid-19th century, of which 101 are houses. This is one of 12 houses with a hip roof. It was built around 1850 into the side of a hill, so the south elevation has three floors and the north elevation has two. The cube-shaped structure features cut coursed stone with blocks of various sizes and shapes, and limestone sills and lintels. There is no indication that this house was ever stuccoed, as several in the vicinity were. The house was listed on the National Register of Historic Places in 1991.
