= Building at 306 South Second Street =

- U.S. National Register of Historic Places
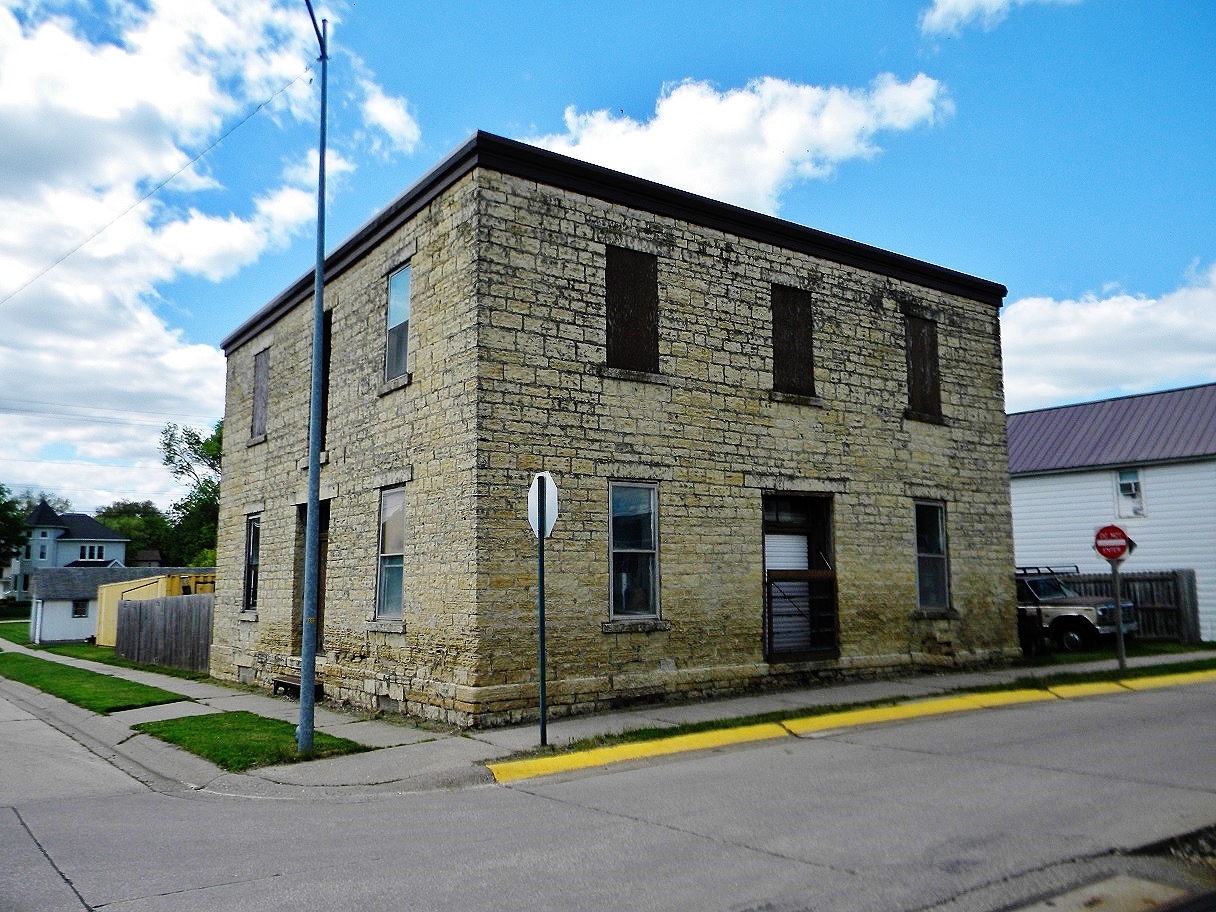

- Location within Iowa Location within the United States
- Location: 306 S. Second St. Bellevue, Iowa
- Coordinates: 42°15′21″N 90°25′24″W
- Area: less than one acre
- Built: 1859
- Architectural style: Vernacular
- MPS: Limestone Architecture of Jackson County MPS
- NRHP reference No.: 91001071
- Added to NRHP: August 30, 1991

The Building at 306 South Second Street is a historic industrial building located in Bellevue, Iowa, United States. It is one of over 217 limestone structures in Jackson County from the mid-19th century, of which 20 are commercial/industrial buildings. The two-story structure was built in 1859 as an industrial facility. It is believed it was initially used as a pork processing plant that produced salt pork, which was then shipped down the Mississippi River. Subsequently, it has housed Haney & Campbell Creamery and Dairy Supplies, a saloon, a pool hall, and by 1928, a residence. The stone blocks that were used in the construction of this square structure vary somewhat in shape and size, and they were laid in courses. The window sills, lintels and watertable are dressed stone. Its two main elevations on Second and Chestnut streets are symmetrical, with three bays. Both have a door in the central bay. The building was listed on the National Register of Historic Places in 1991.
