= Mrs. Lydia Johnson House =

Historic house in Iowa, United States

- U.S. National Register of Historic Places
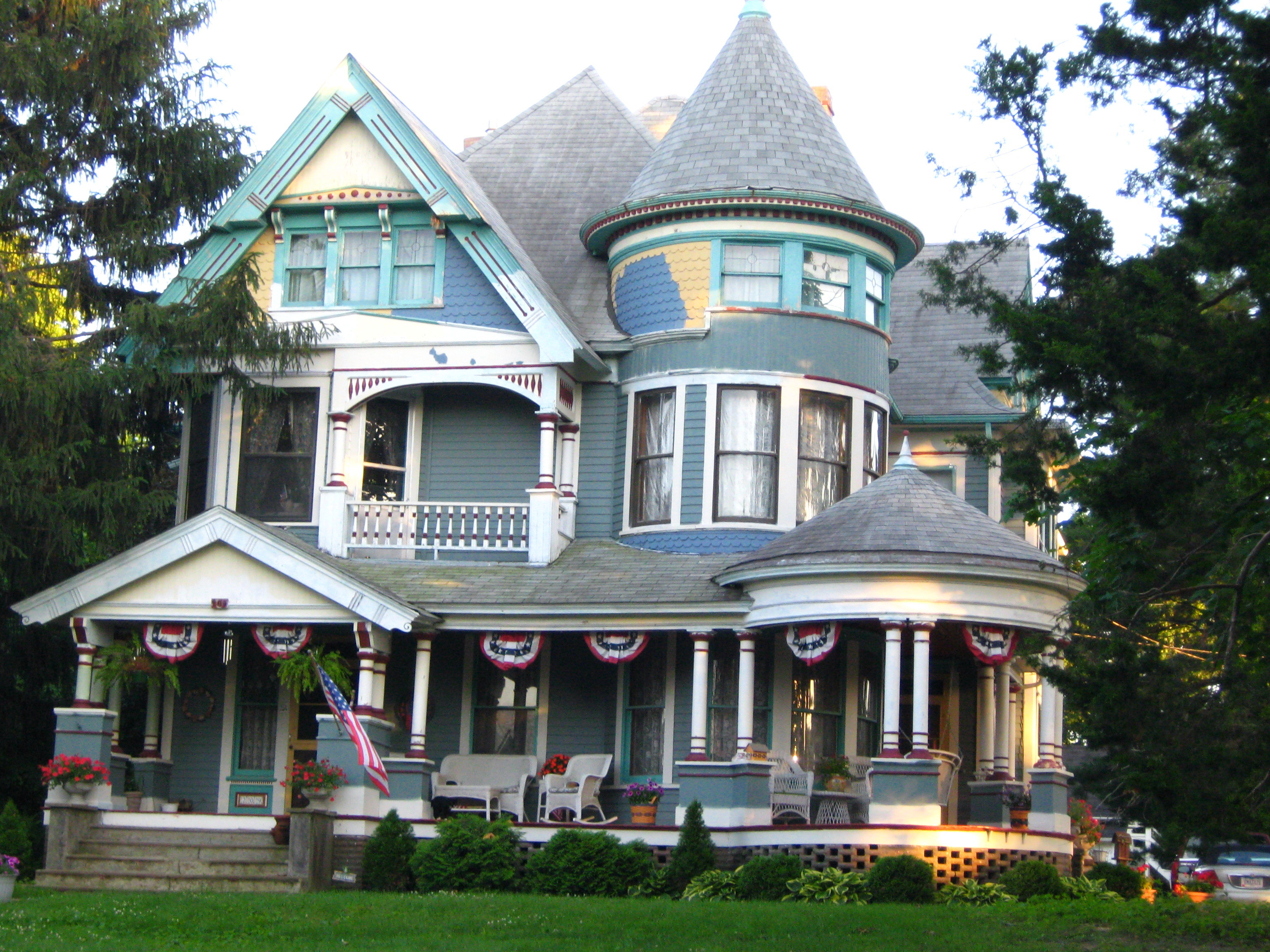

- Location within Iowa Location within the United States
- Location: 209 East Locust Street, Maquoketa, Iowa
- Coordinates: 42°03′51″N 90°39′47″W
- Area: 14,400 square feet (about 1,338 square meters)
- Built: About 1895
- Architectural style: Queen Anne
- MPS: Maquoketa MPS
- NRHP reference No.: 91000966
- Added to NRHP: August 9, 1991

The Mrs. Lydia Johnson House is a historic residence located in Maquoketa, Iowa, United States. This house is a fine example of Queen Anne style architecture in the United States. It was built during the economic boom years in the city's development. Built in 1895, the two and one half storey house features a complex irregular composition, a corner tower, wrap-around porch, a small porch on the second floor above the main porch, various window shapes and sizes, and textured wall surfaces on the exterior. Little is known about the Johnson family who built it, but its notability is derived from the architecture. The house was listed on the National Register of Historic Places in 1991.
