= Insane Asylum at the County Poor Farm =

- U.S. National Register of Historic Places
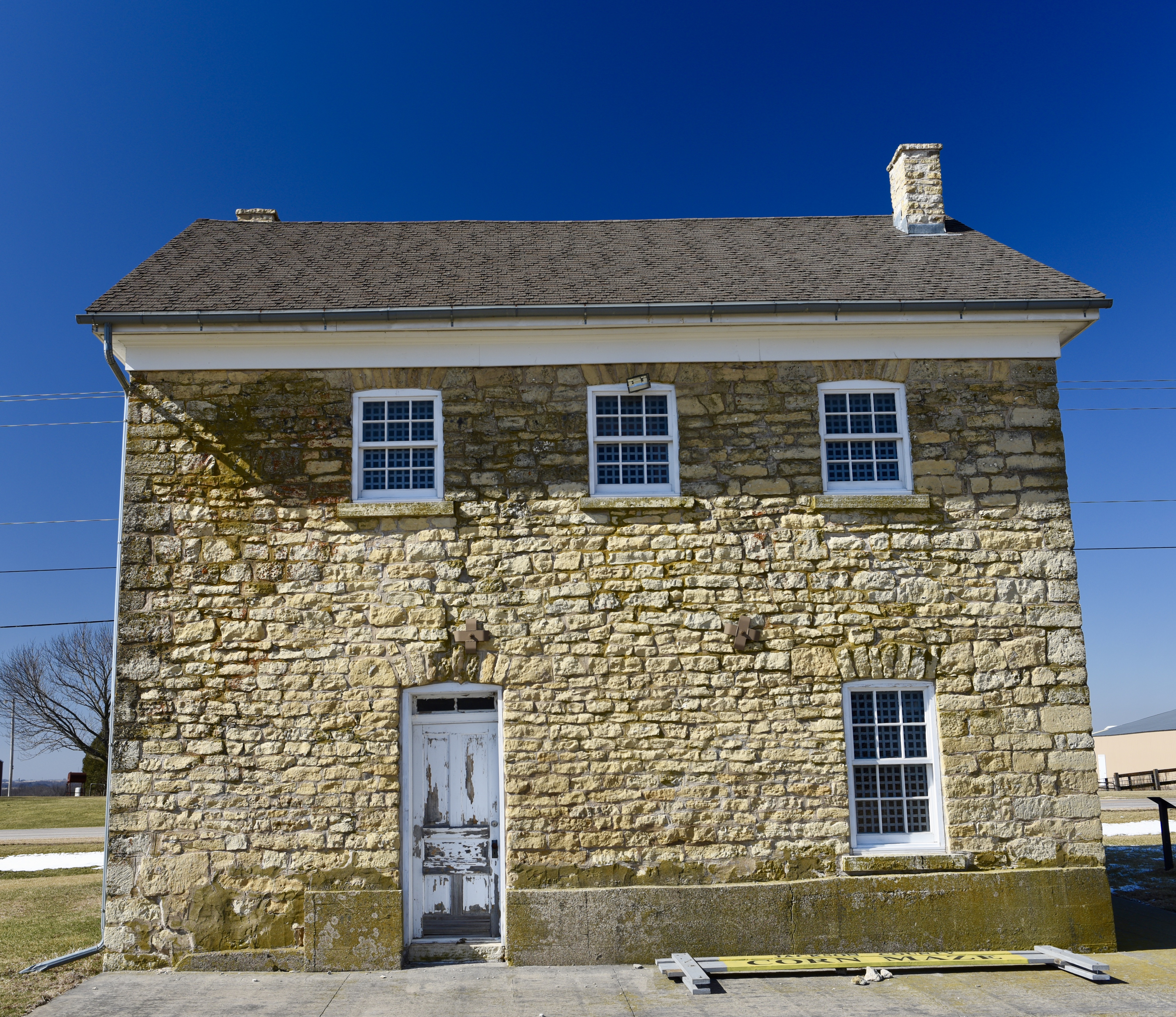

- Location within Iowa Location within the United States
- Location: Eastern side of County Road Y61 (250th Ave.) north of Andrew
- Coordinates: 42°11′56″N 90°36′36″W
- Area: less than one acre
- Built: 1872
- Built by: Strasser & Schlecht; John Weis
- Architectural style: Vernacular
- MPS: Limestone Architecture of Jackson County MPS
- NRHP reference No.: 92000918
- Added to NRHP: July 24, 1992

The Insane Asylum at the County Poor Farm is a historic building located north of Andrew, Iowa, United States. It is one of over 217 limestone structures in Jackson County from the mid-19th century.

== Description ==
Built in 1872, this 2½-story structure is composed of stone blocks that vary somewhat in shape and size, and they were laid in courses. Because of its late date compared with the other historic stone buildings in the county, it features segmental arches instead of lintels. By the time it was built limestone construction in the county had already reached its peak. Adam Strasser and Frank Schlecht were contractors from Bellevue, Iowa who were responsible for its construction, as was local stonemason John Weis. The other 19th-century buildings from the poor farm have been removed, and replaced by the county care facility across the highway. This building is now part of a demonstration farm. It was listed on the National Register of Historic Places in 1992.
