= Bassnett–Nickerson House =

Historic house in Iowa, United States

- U.S. National Register of Historic Places
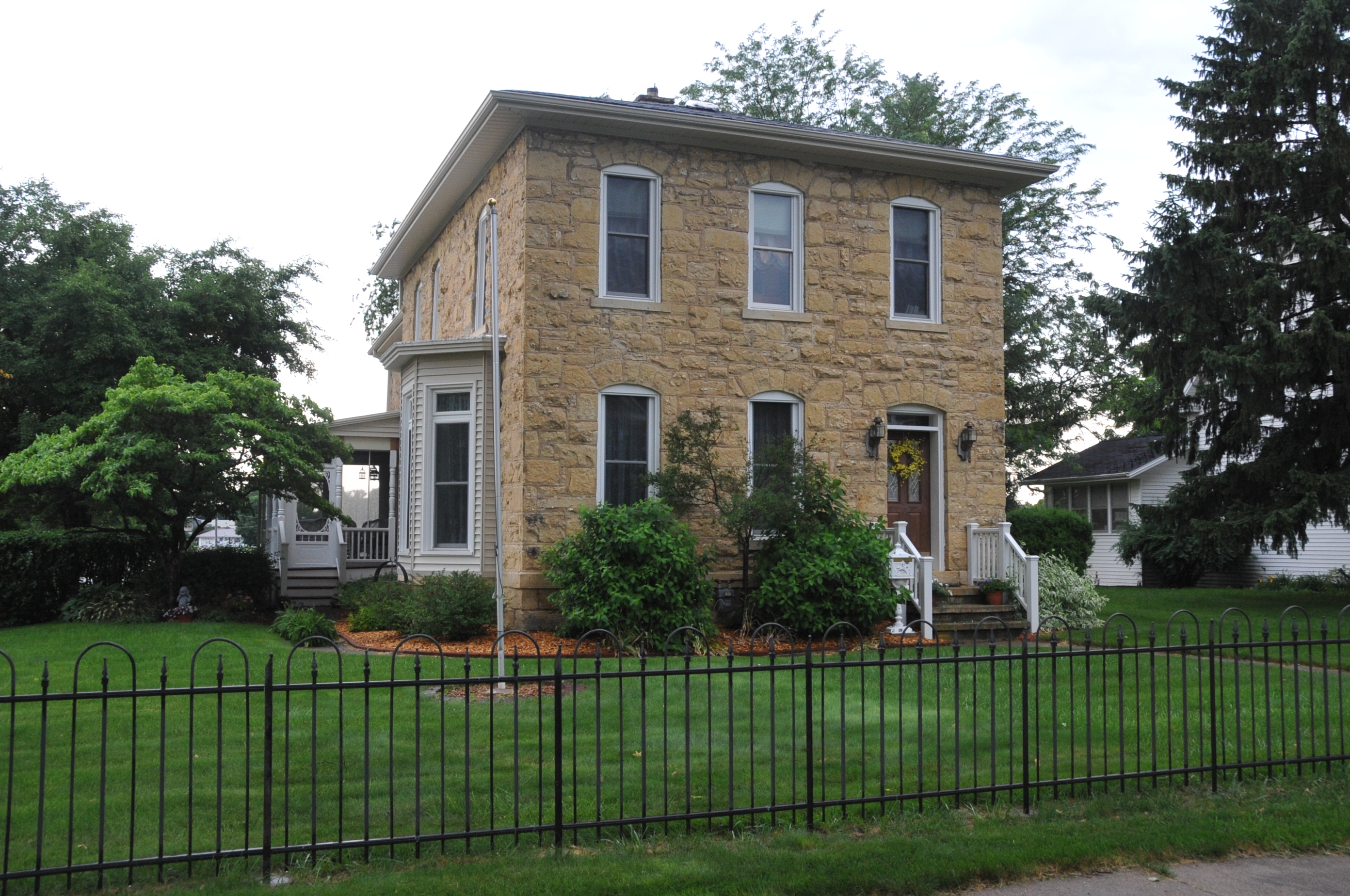

- Location within Iowa Location within the United States
- Location: 116 South Vermont Street, Maquoketa, Iowa
- Coordinates: 42°04′04″N 90°40′24″W
- Area: less than one acre
- Built: 1875
- Architectural style: Vernacular Italianate
- MPS: Limestone Architecture of Jackson County MPS
- NRHP reference No.: 92000914
- Added to NRHP: July 24, 1992

The Bassnett–Nickerson House (also known as the T. K. Nickerson House) is a historic house located at 116 South Vermont Street in Maquoketa, Iowa.

== Description and history ==
Its significance is derived from it being a rectangular plan stone house with a hipped roof. That was uncommon for a stone residential building in Jackson County, and it is the only known stone house in the city of Maquoketa. The house also has Italianate elements. Besides the low pitched hipped roof it also features broad eaves, segmental arched openings, and a polygonal bay. It lacks brackets, and any indication of them, which is typical of the Italianate style. The stonework is also unusual in that it is random rubble rather than blocks of cut stone laid in courses.

Thomas Bassnett was the landowner at about the time the house was built. T. K. Nickerson was a successful Maquoketa area businessman. He owned a 320-acre (130 ha) farm west of the city where he ran a saw mill, flour mill, and woolen mill. In 1876 he began to quarry the limestone on the property and produced burnt lime. This house remained in his family until 1917.

It was listed on the National Register of Historic Places on July 24, 1992.
