= C.M. Sanborn Building =

- U.S. National Register of Historic Places
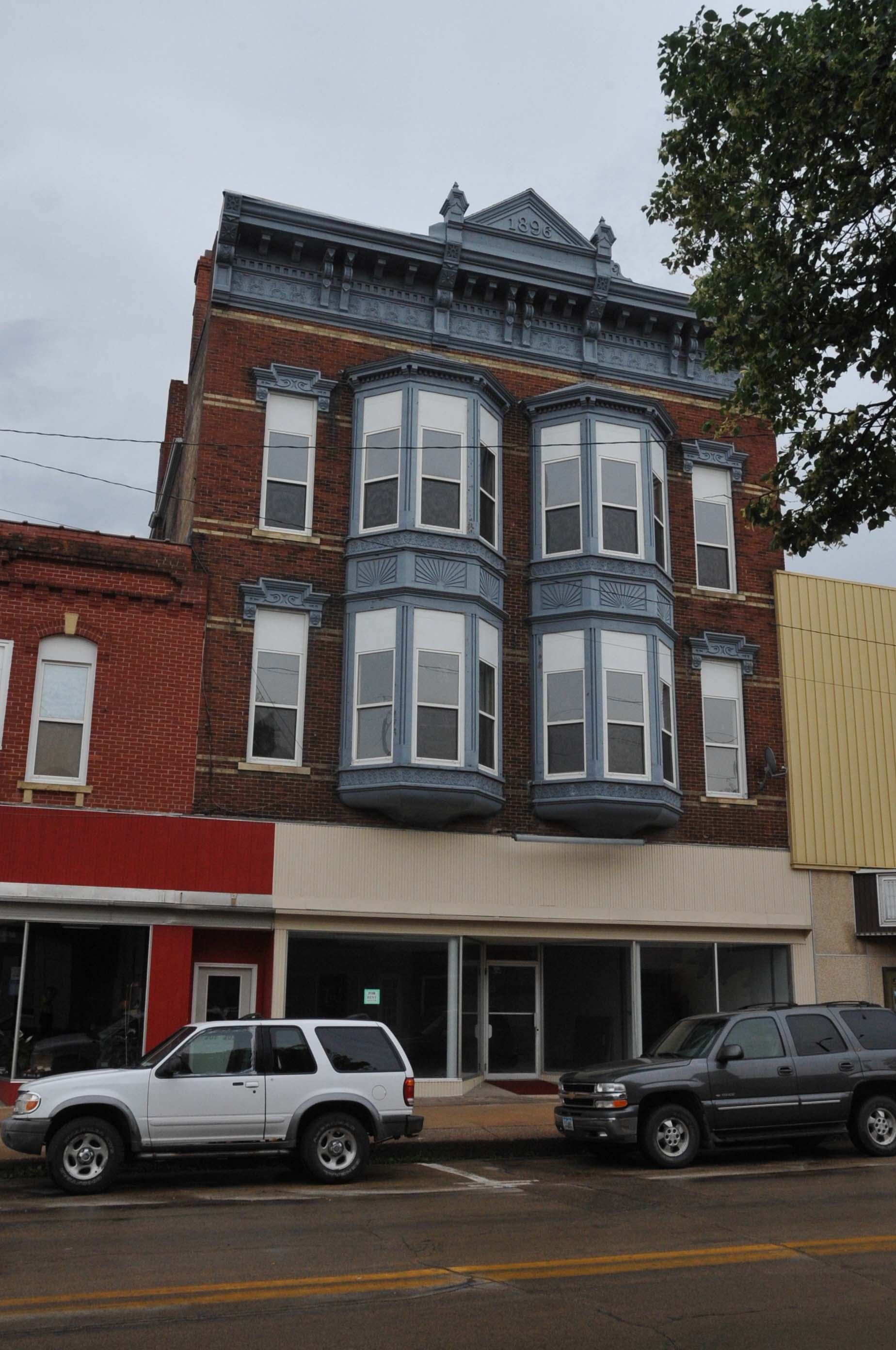

- Location within Iowa Location within the United States
- Location: 203 S. Main; Maquoketa, Iowa
- Coordinates: 42°04′02″N 90°39′54″W
- Area: less than one acre
- Built: 1896
- Built by: Wm. Hancock; W.P. Thomas
- Architectural style: Italianate
- MPS: Maquoketa MPS
- NRHP reference No.: 89002106
- Added to NRHP: August 9, 1991

The C.M. Sanborn Building is a historic building in Maquoketa, Iowa, United States. Built in 1896, it is significant as an example of High Victorian Italianate architecture. The three-story, brick building features cast hoodmolds above the windows, twin oriel windows, and an elaborate cornice. C.M. Sanborn was a local grocer whose business operated out of a number of buildings in the central business district before he built this building. He acted as the general contractor for the construction of this building, and hired two local builders to construct it. William Hancock was a brick mason, and W.P. Thomas was a carpenter. Sanborn filed for bankruptcy around 1911, and was forced to sell the building. A variety of retail establishments have occupied the main floor, while the second floor was rented as office space. A Masonic lodge occupied the third floor shortly after the building was completed, and remained until 1968. The Masons owned the building by that time. The building was listed on the National Register of Historic Places in 1991.
