= Jeremiah Wood House =

Historic house in Iowa, United States

- U.S. National Register of Historic Places
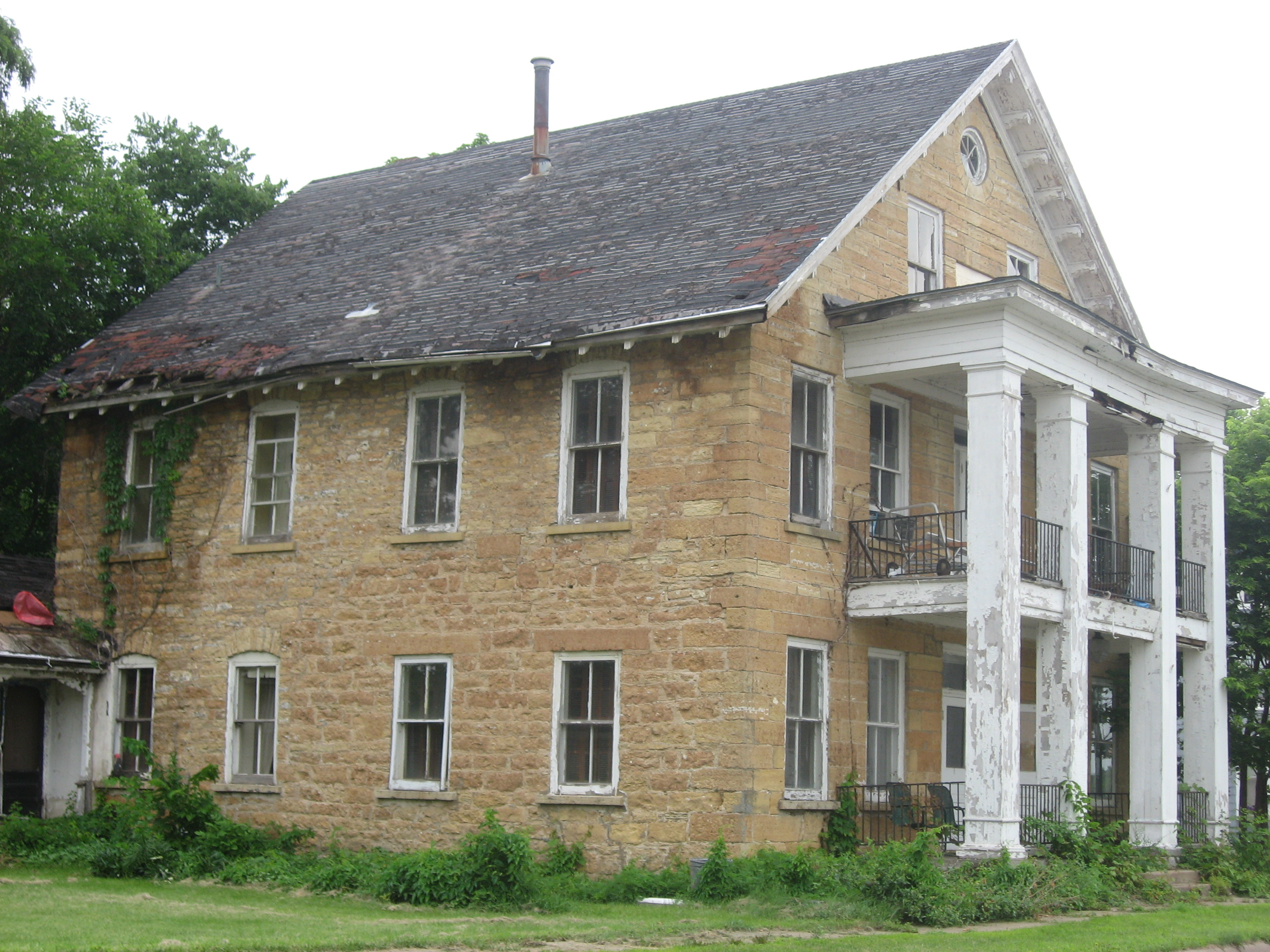

- Location within Iowa Location within the United States
- Location: 802 River St. Sabula, Iowa
- Coordinates: 42°04′05″N 90°10′14″W
- Area: less than one acre
- Built: 1866
- Built by: Jeremiah Wood
- Architectural style: Vernacular
- NRHP reference No.: 82000409
- Added to NRHP: November 10, 1982

The Jeremiah Wood House is a historic residence located in Sabula, Iowa, United States. The house is associated with the settlement of Sabula, and the occupation of steamboat pilot. Dr. Enoch A. Wood and his father James settled here in 1836 and platted the town the same year. It was named Sabula ten years later. Enoch's brother Jeremiah joined them in 1837, and worked in the family retail store. He became a steamboat pilot around 1852, and married his wife in 1860. He built the major part of this house six years later. The 2½-story stone house was built on the banks of the Mississippi River. It features modillions along the rooflines, ocular windows on the gable ends, and a two-story porch on the main facade. The back wing may be as much as 30 years older. The house was listed on the National Register of Historic Places in 1982.
