= Bellevue Herald Building =

- U.S. National Register of Historic Places
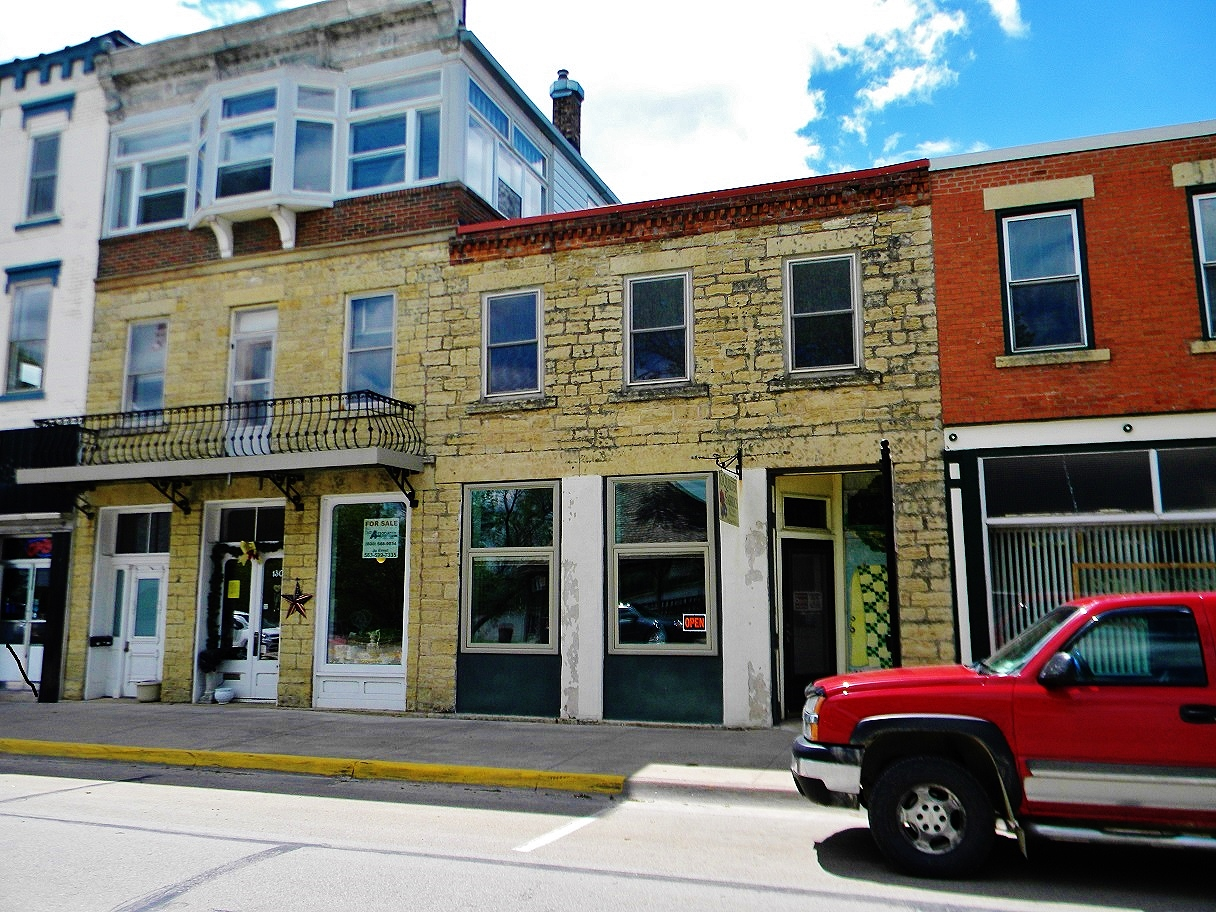
- Bellevue Herald Building is on the left

- Location within Iowa Location within the United States
- Location: 130 S. Riverview St. Bellevue, Iowa
- Coordinates: 42°15′29″N 90°25′22″W
- Area: less than one acre
- Built: 1855
- Architectural style: Vernacular
- MPS: Limestone Architecture of Jackson County MPS
- NRHP reference No.: 91001079
- Added to NRHP: August 30, 1991

The Bellevue Herald Building is a historic commercial building located in Bellevue, Iowa, United States. It is one of over 217 limestone structures in Jackson County from the mid-19th century, of which 20 are commercial buildings. The lower two floors were built around 1855 with limestone, and the third floor was a frame addition from 1905. The stone blocks that were used in its construction vary somewhat in shape and size, and they were laid in courses. The lintels and watertable are dressed stone. The second floor is three bays wide with a door in the center bay that opens onto an iron balcony. There is an oriel window on the third floor, and an Italianate metal cornice with brackets caps the main facade. The building was listed on the National Register of Historic Places in 1991.
