= Merrero Building =

- U.S. National Register of Historic Places
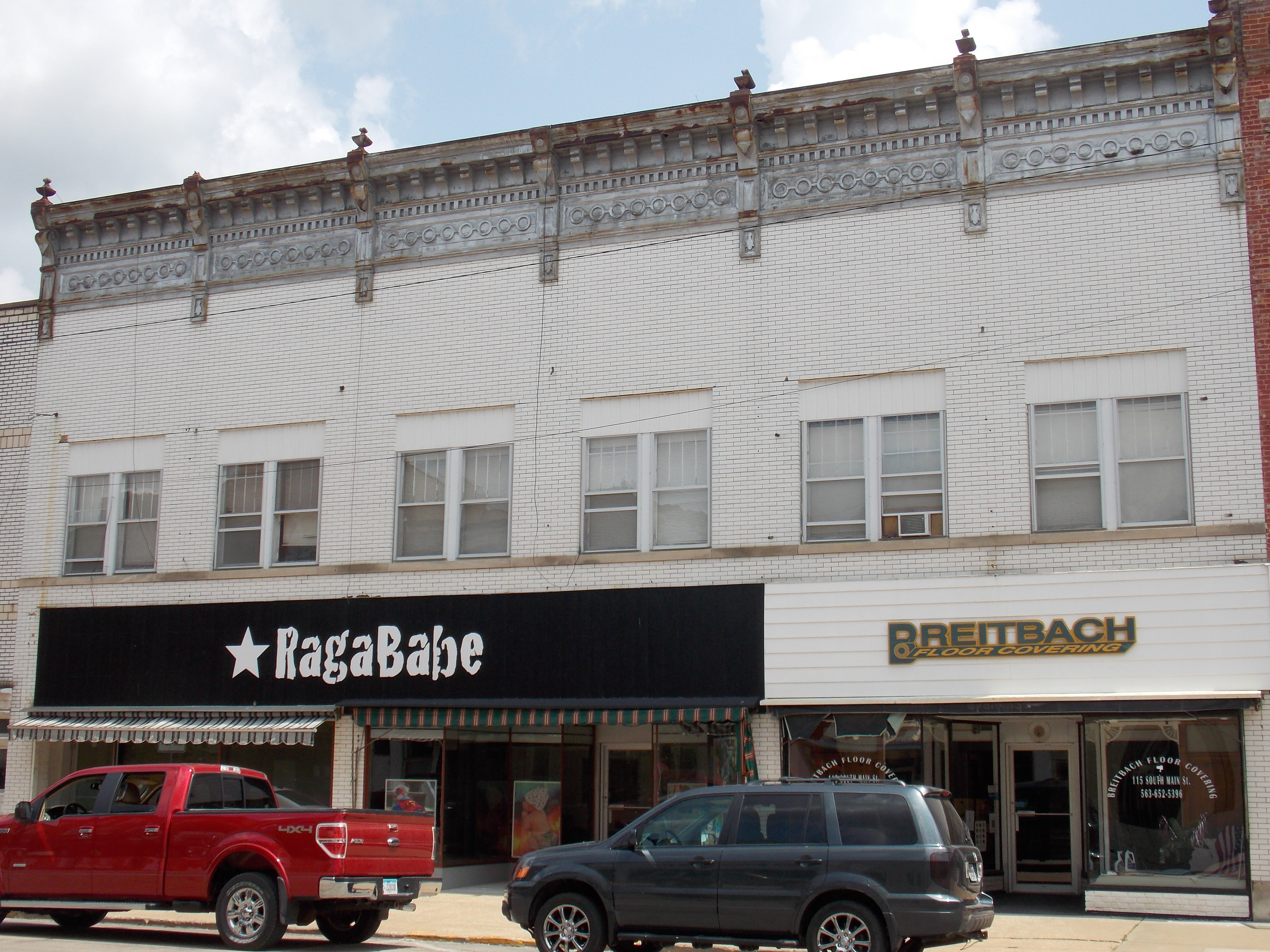

- Location within Iowa Location within the United States
- Location: 111-115 S. Main; Maquoketa, Iowa
- Coordinates: 42°04′07″N 90°39′54″W
- Area: less than one acre
- Built: 1918
- Architectural style: Late 19th and Early 20th Century American Movements
- MPS: Maquoketa MPS
- NRHP reference No.: 89002107
- Added to NRHP: August 9, 1991

The Merrero Building is a historic building located in Maquoketa, Iowa, United States. It was built in 1918 to replace a three-story brick building on the same location that was damaged in a fire the previous year. While there was a debate about whether to rebuild or build new, it appears they built a new building. It is a two-story structure with three storefronts on the main level. It is significant as an example of early 20th-century commercial design and material. The exterior is composed of white glazed brick with paired windows on the second floor. An old fashioned Italianate metal cornice caps the main facade. While it looks out of place, historic photos show that it is part of the original design. Marble panels were originally located below the display windows on the main floor. The storefront on the left has been altered, but the other two are originals. Transoms above the second floor windows, and the prism glass transoms above the storefronts remain in place, but have been covered. The building was listed on the National Register of Historic Places in 1991.
