= Fritz Chapel =

- U.S. National Register of Historic Places
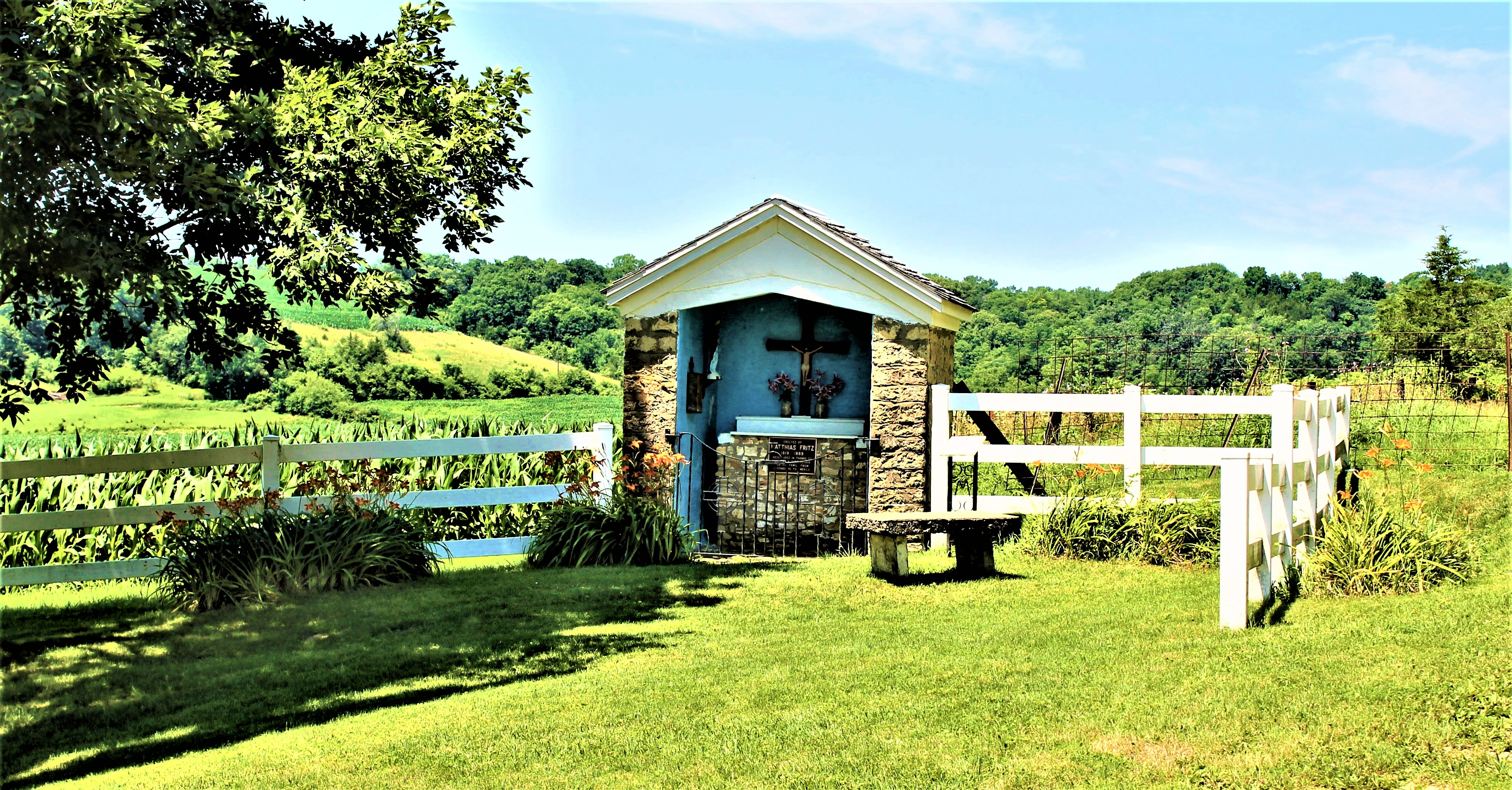

- Location within Iowa Location within the United States
- Location: Spruce Creek Rd. west of its junction with U.S. Route 52
- Nearest city: Bellevue, Iowa
- Coordinates: 42°17′41″N 90°29′34″W
- Area: less than one acre
- Built: 1852
- Built by: Mathias Fritz
- Architectural style: Vernacular
- MPS: Limestone Architecture of Jackson County MPS
- NRHP reference No.: 91001067
- Added to NRHP: August 30, 1991

Fritz Chapel is a historic religious structure located northwest of Bellevue, Iowa, United States. The small roadside chapel was built by Mathias Fritz (1819-1889) in 1852. Fritz immigrated with his family to the United States from Luxembourg that same year. He built this chapel as an act of thanksgiving for the safe journey. The roughly 8-by-7-foot (2.4 by 2.1 m) structure has limestone walls on three sides and is open on the front. It is capped with a gable roof. The walls inside the chapel are plastered, and it houses a small stone altar and a hand-carved crucifix. Located on the north side of a gravel road, it is surrounded by a picket fence. It was listed on the National Register of Historic Places in 1991.
