= Dyas Hexagonal Barn =

- U.S. National Register of Historic Places
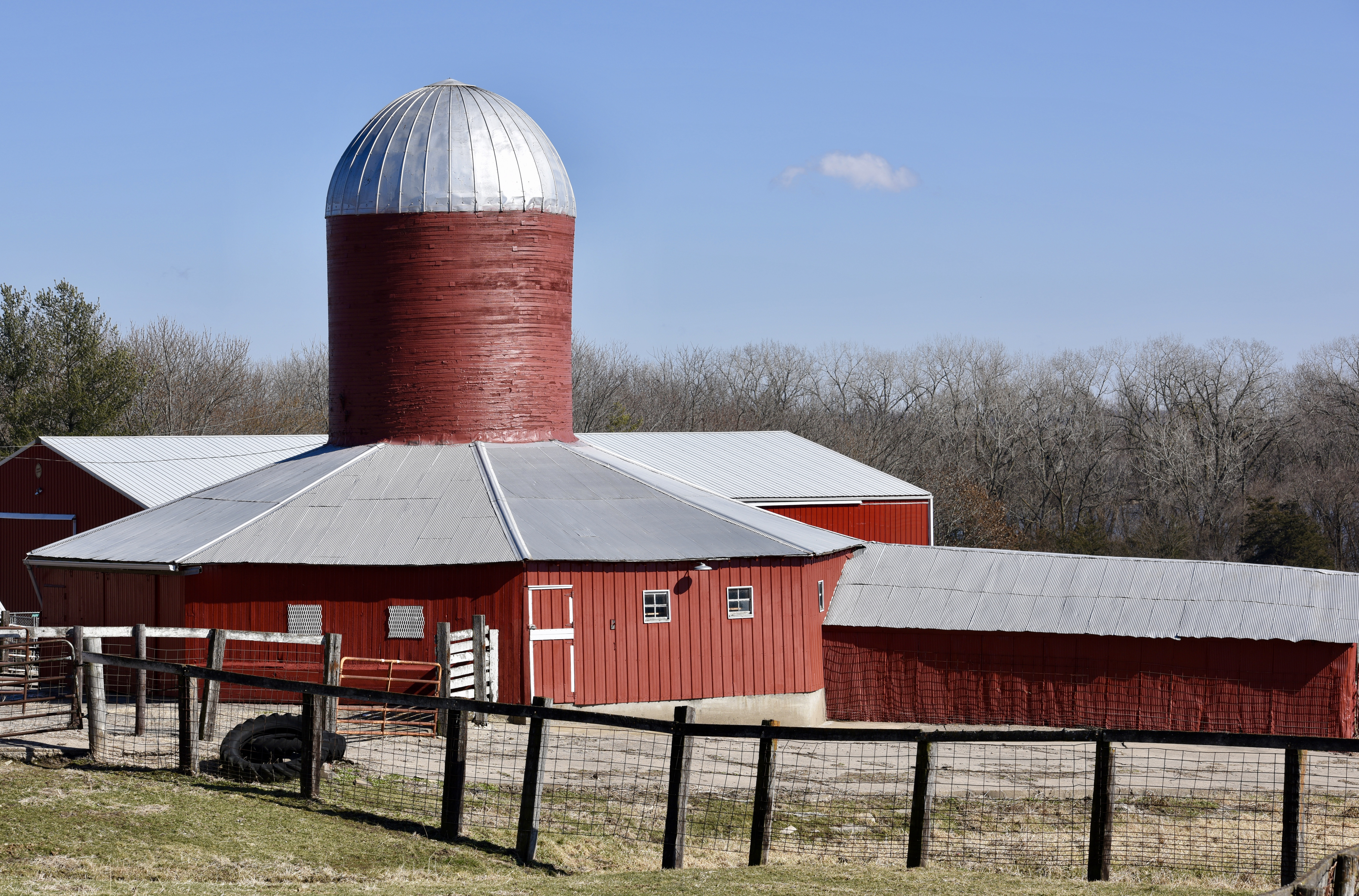

- Location within Iowa Location within the United States
- Location: U.S. Route 52; Bellevue, Iowa
- Coordinates: 42°14′38″N 90°25′03″W
- Area: less than one acre
- Built: 1921
- MPS: Iowa Round Barns: The Sixty Year Experiment TR
- NRHP reference No.: 86001442
- Added to NRHP: June 30, 1986

The Dyas Hexagonal Barn is a historical building located near Bellevue in rural Jackson County, Iowa, United States. Built in 1921, it is a round barn measuring 50 feet (15 m) around, with red horizontal siding on a stone foundation, a tin roof, and a central wood stave silo extending through the roof. Despite the common name, the building is actually eight-sided, and is also known as the Dyas Octagonal Barn. Originally the roof was flat or almost flat; it is one of four round barns known to have been built on the same farm. It has been listed on the National Register of Historic Places since 1986.
