= Mrs. Margaret Sieben House =

Historic house in Iowa, United States

- U.S. National Register of Historic Places
- Location within Iowa Location within the United States
- Location: 0.3 miles east of County Road Y34 north of Baldwin
- Coordinates: 42°05′21″N 90°50′09″W
- Area: less than one acre
- Built: 1869
- Architectural style: Vernacular
- MPS: Limestone Architecture of Jackson County MPS
- NRHP reference No.: 92000916
- Added to NRHP: July 24, 1992

The Mrs. Margaret Sieben House is a historic residence located north of Baldwin, Iowa, United States. It is one of over 217 limestone structures in Jackson County from the mid-19th century, of which 101 are houses. This is one of the largest stone houses built in that era, but what makes it unique is the use of ashlar blocks for the major elevations. It also features "high style" elements such as the denticulated cornice. There is a wing on the south side of the house with an enclosed wooden porch. The house is located at the end of a long lane facing a gently sloping hillside.

Margaret Sieben was a native of Oldenberg, Germany who settled in Jackson County in 1850 and married Diederick Sieben, also a German immigrant, the following year. After his death in 1861 she ran the farm herself, and had this house built in 1869. The house was listed on the National Register of Historic Places in 1992.
