= Kucheman Building =

- U.S. National Register of Historic Places
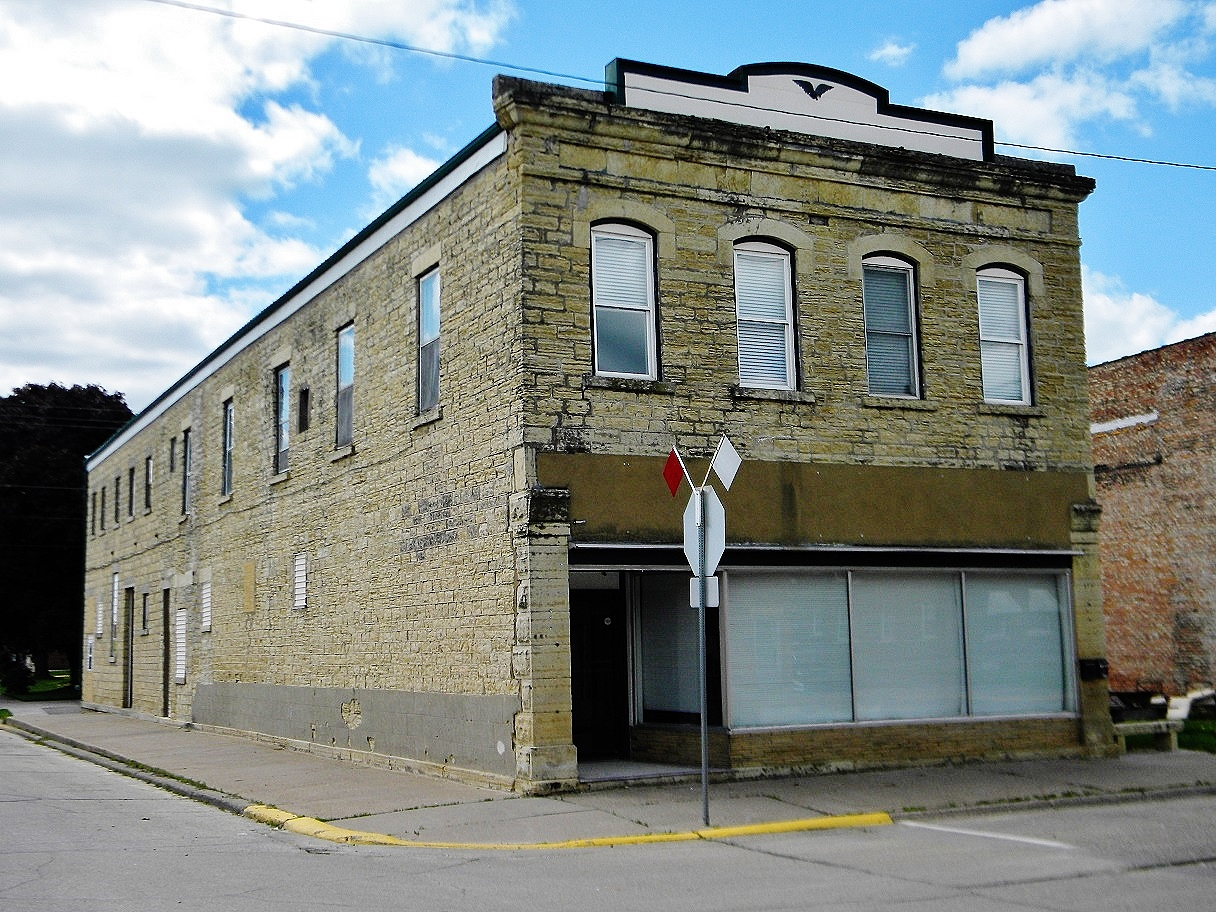

- Location within Iowa Location within the United States
- Location: 100 N. 2nd St. Bellevue, Iowa
- Coordinates: 42°15′30″N 90°25′28″W
- Area: less than one acre
- Built: 1868
- Architectural style: Vernacular
- MPS: Limestone Architecture of Jackson County MPS
- NRHP reference No.: 91001072
- Added to NRHP: August 30, 1991

The Kucheman Building is a historic commercial building located in Bellevue, Iowa, United States. It is one of over 217 limestone structures in Jackson County from the mid-19th century, of which 20 are commercial buildings. The two-story structure was built in 1868 to house Kucheman & Son, a dry goods and clothing store. The second floor housed an Opera Hall and City Hall. An addition was built onto the rear of the building sometime between 1902 and 1914. The building features four bays on its main facade, which is capped by a stone cornice with arched metal pediment. The stone blocks used in its construction vary somewhat in shape and size, and they were laid in courses. It also features dressed stone window sills and lintels. What differentiates this building from the others is its segmental arched windows. The second floor windows on the front have simple stone hoodmolds. The building was listed on the National Register of Historic Places in 1991.
