= Lyon Block =

- U.S. National Register of Historic Places
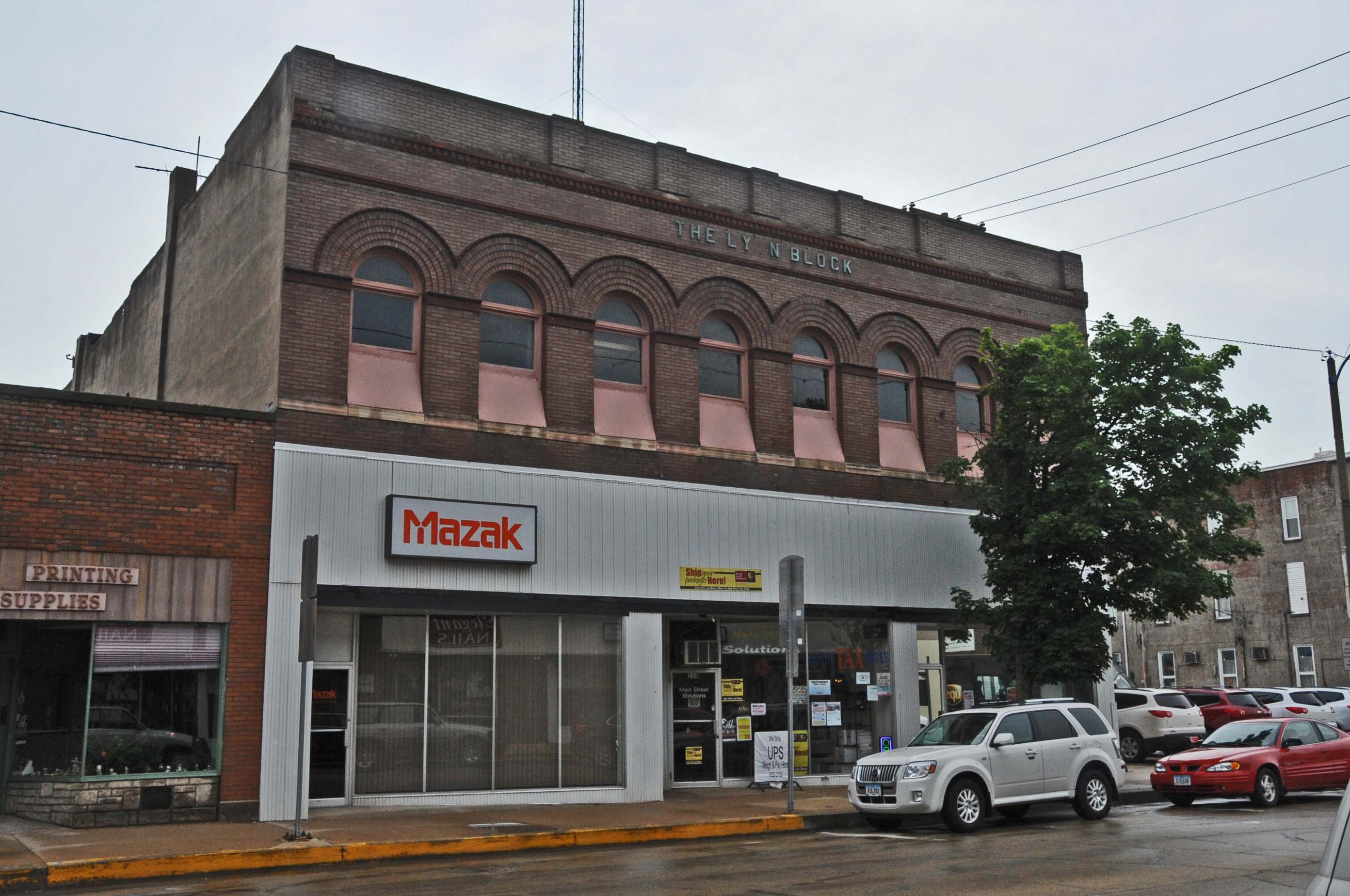

- Location within Iowa Location within the United States
- Location: 112-116 N. Main; Maquoketa, Iowa
- Coordinates: 42°04′11″N 90°39′57″W
- Area: less than one acre
- Built: 1900
- MPS: Maquoketa MPS
- NRHP reference No.: 89002104
- Added to NRHP: August 9, 1991

The Lyon Block is a historic building located in Maquoketa, Iowa, United States. Built in 1900, the significance in this building is found in its use of brick. It introduced the use of warm brown into the downtown color scheme. Brick is also the main design element of the building as found in the rhythmical arches above the second floor windows. The color and texture of the wall surface are now the important decorative features and not that which was applied to it. The man floor storefront has been altered, but the significant historical elements of the building have been left in place. The building was listed on the National Register of Historic Places in 1991.
