= Canton School =

- U.S. National Register of Historic Places
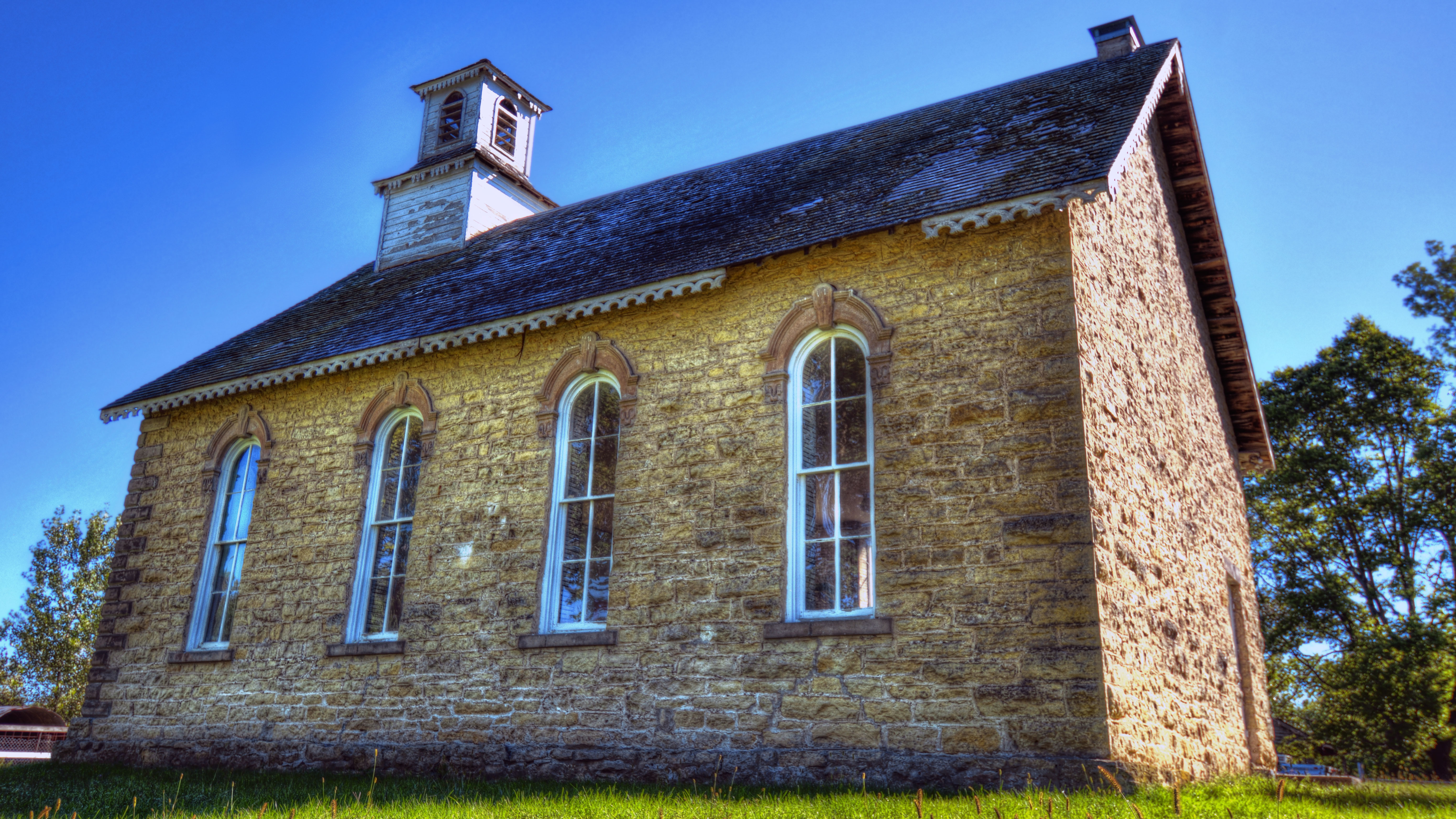

- Location within Iowa Location within the United States
- Location: South St. Canton, Iowa
- Coordinates: 42°09′40″N 90°53′47″W
- Area: less than one acre
- Built: 1877
- Architectural style: Vernacular
- NRHP reference No.: 79000898
- Added to NRHP: July 24, 1979

Canton School is a historic one-room schoolhouse located in the unincorporated community of Canton, Iowa, United States. This school building was built in 1877 of locally quarried, roughly-dressed limestone, laid in a random ashlar pattern. The main facade, however, is faced with concrete brick that is original to the structure. What is unusual about this building is its decorative elements, as most one-room schoolhouses built in Iowa were plain. The eaves and the two-stage wooden bell tower are edged with rather delicate wooden trim, and the windows are capped with concrete keystone hoods. The use of concrete is rather sophisticated for a building in the vernacular-folk architectural style in stone. The building served as a school until 1966 when the area's school districts were reorganized. It served as a church until 1968, and it is now surrounded by a park.

The building was listed on the National Register of Historic Places in 1979. As of 2016 a group called Friends of Canton School is working to restore the structure.
