= Alexander Organ House =

Historic house in Iowa, United States

- U.S. National Register of Historic Places
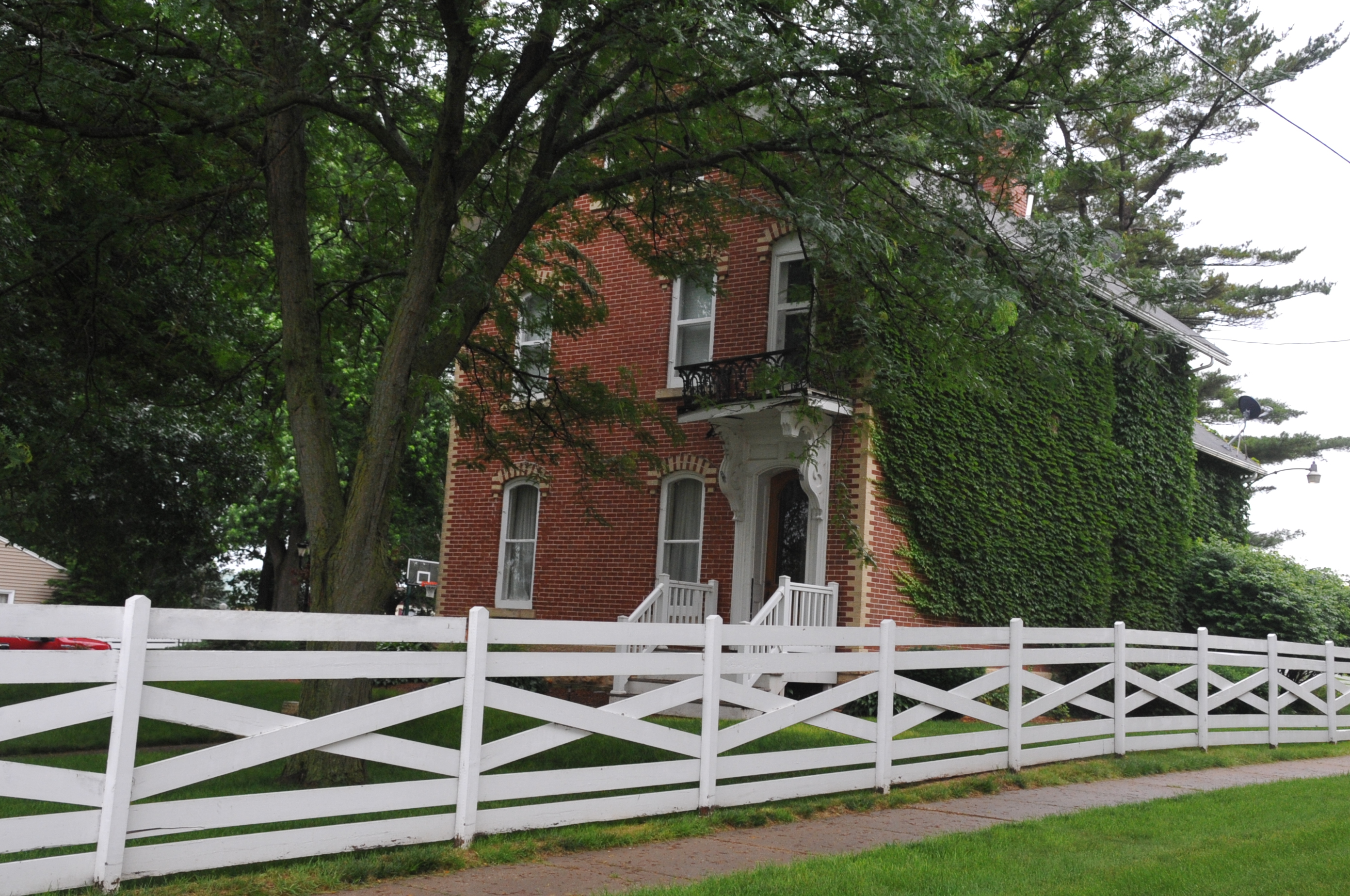

- Location within Iowa Location within the United States
- Location: 607 W. Summit; Maquoketa, Iowa
- Coordinates: 42°03′42″N 90°40′22″W
- Area: less than one acre
- Built: 1896
- Architectural style: Late Victorian
- MPS: Maquoketa MPS
- NRHP reference No.: 91000968
- Added to NRHP: August 9, 1991

The Alexander Organ House is a historic residence located in Maquoketa, Iowa, United States. It is one of several Victorian houses in Maquoketa that are noteworthy for their quoined corners, a rare architectural feature in Iowa. Built around 1896, the 2 1/2-story brick house follows an L-shaped plan. It features a 1 1/2-story wing in the back, quoining with cream-colored brick, limestone foundation, gable roof, a polygonal bay window on the east elevation, and a bracketed canopied porch with cresting on the main facade. Organ worked as a clothing merchant. This house was one of many houses built during Maquoketa's economic expansion in the late 19th century. It was listed on the National Register of Historic Places in 1991.
