= Henry Lubben House, Smokehouse and Springhouse =

Historic house in Iowa, United States

- U.S. National Register of Historic Places
- Location within Iowa Location within the United States
- Location: Western side of County Road Y34 north of Baldwin
- Coordinates: 42°05′38″N 90°50′26″W
- Area: less than one acre
- Built: 1858-1860
- Architectural style: Vernacular
- MPS: Limestone Architecture of Jackson County MPS
- NRHP reference No.: 92000919
- Added to NRHP: July 24, 1992

The Henry Lubben House, Smokehouse and Springhouse are a collection of historic buildings located north of Baldwin, Iowa, United States. They are three of over 217 limestone structures in Jackson County from the mid-19th century, of which 101 were houses, 13 were springhouses, and 36 were other farm related buildings. What makes the Lubben buildings unique is that the three stone buildings are grouped together on the farmstead. The wood frame farm buildings are located immediately to the north. The stonework on the house is coursed-cut stone that is believed to have been quarried just west of the house. The windows have dressed stone sills and lintels. It also features "high style" elements such as the denticulated wooden cornice. The house is L-shaped with a single story stone section on the back, which is original to the house, capped by a wood frame second floor that was added later. An enclosed wooden porch on the front was added in 1931. The quality of the stonework on the springhouse and the smokehouse are of a lesser quality.

Henry Lubben was a native of Oldenberg, Germany who settled in Jackson County in 1837. He was one of the first settlers in Monmouth Township. He married in 1858 and the house was built that same year. The two out buildings were built either at the same time, or possibly later in the century. The buildings were listed together on the National Register of Historic Places in 1992.
