= Building at 101 North Riverview Street =

- U.S. National Register of Historic Places
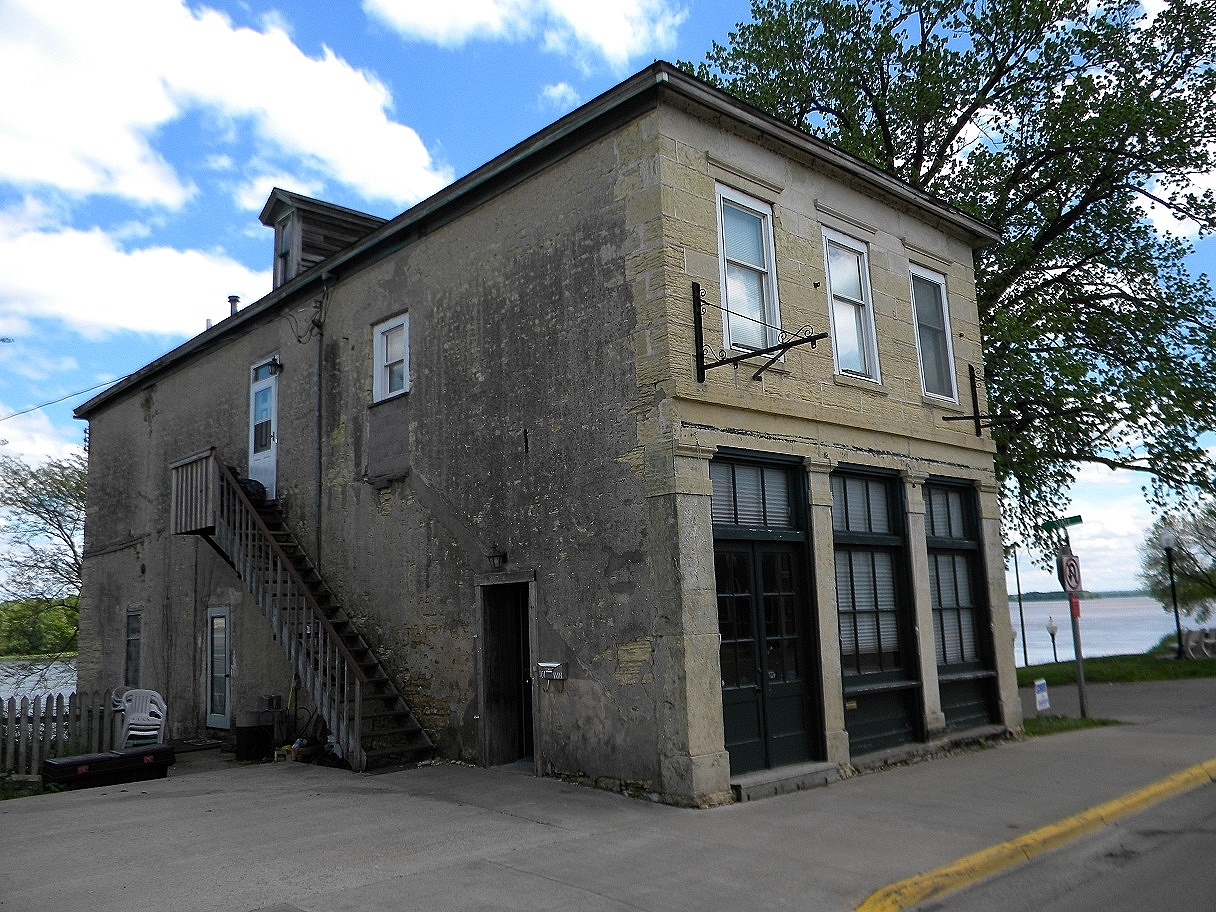

- Location within Iowa Location within the United States
- Location: 101 N. Riverview St. Bellevue, Iowa
- Coordinates: 42°15′32″N 90°25′22″W
- Area: less than one acre
- Built: 1850
- Architectural style: Vernacular
- MPS: Limestone Architecture of Jackson County MPS
- NRHP reference No.: 91001068
- Added to NRHP: August 30, 1991

The Building at 101 North Riverview Street is a historic commercial building located in Bellevue, Iowa, United States. It is one of over 217 limestone structures in Jackson County from the mid-19th century, of which 20 are commercial buildings. The two-floor structure was built around 1850 along the levee. Because the property slopes toward the Mississippi River, it appears to be a four-story building on the riverside. It was built to house a retail establishment, but its original use has not been determined. By 1885 it housed a dry goods store, and by 1894 it housed a hardware store and implement dealership, which was located here for decades. The rectangular plan structure is three bays wide, and it has a stone storefront. It was given a light coating of stucco and scored giving it an ashlar appearance. The second-floor windows have simple hoodmolds above them, while the rest of the windows have stone lintels. What differentiates this building from the others is that it is a freestanding commercial structure, capped with a hip roof. The building was listed on the National Register of Historic Places in 1991.
