= Mill Rock School =

Historic place in Iowa, United States

- U.S. National Register of Historic Places
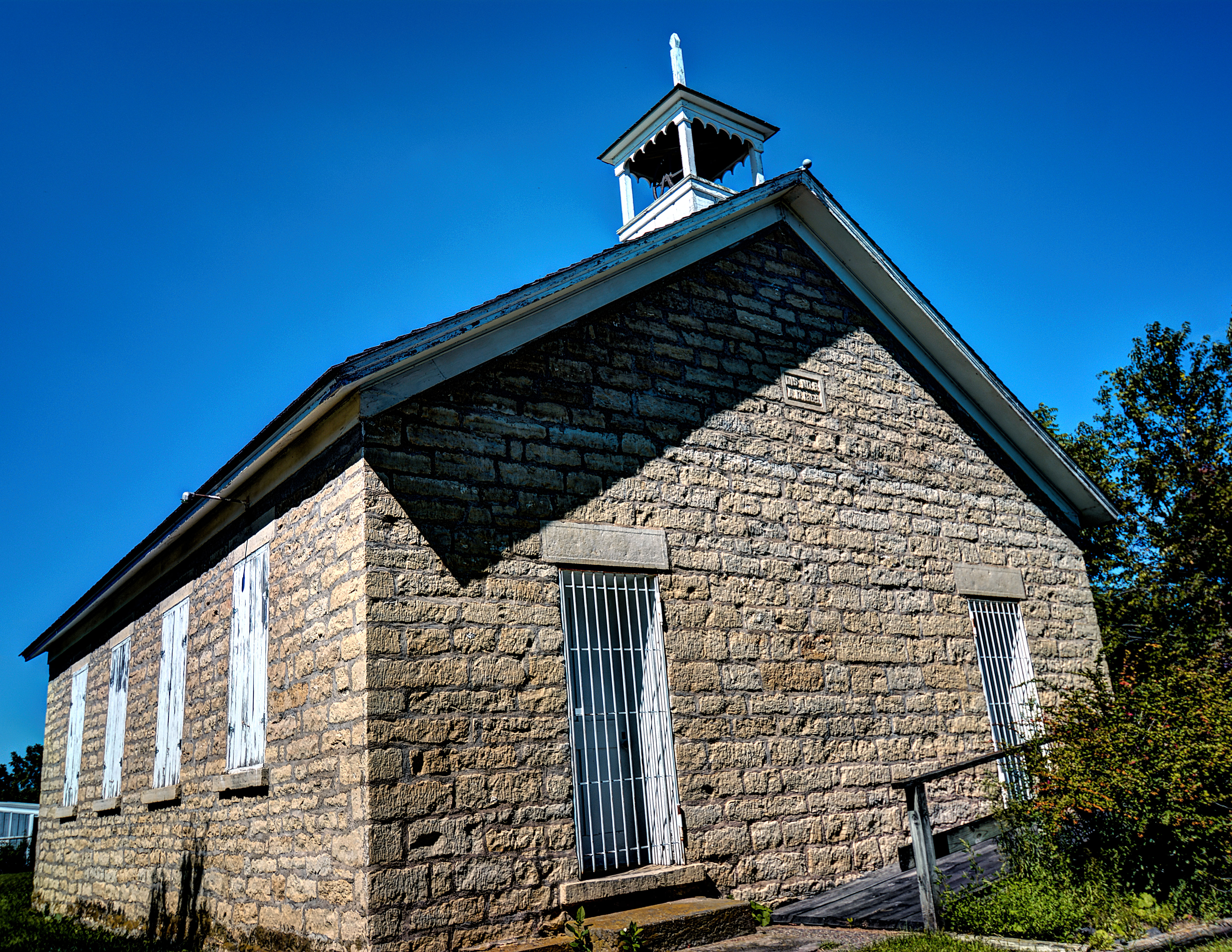

- Location within Iowa Location within the United States
- Location: Western side of 153rd Ave., south of Baldwin
- Coordinates: 42°03′31″N 90°50′21″W
- Area: less than one acre
- Built: 1869
- Built by: Abner Hunt; P.A. Downer
- Architectural style: Vernacular
- MPS: Limestone Architecture of Jackson County MPS
- NRHP reference No.: 92000913
- Added to NRHP: July 24, 1992

The Mill Rock School is a historic one-room schoolhouse located just to the south of Baldwin, Iowa, United States. It is one of over 217 limestone structures in Jackson County from the mid-19th century, of which 12 are school buildings. This school building was built in 1869 by Abner Hunt and P.A. Downer. The stone blocks that were used in the construction of this rectangular structure vary somewhat in shape and size, and they were laid in courses. The window sills and lintels are dressed stone. There is a brick chimney on the west elevation, and two entrance doors on the east elevation. Having two entrance doors is unusual for rural Jackson County schools. A name and date stone is located in the east gable.

The school building was built in the former town of Mill Rock, the first municipality established in Monmouth Township. When the Midland Railroad was built to the northeast in 1872, the town of Baldwin was established and Mill Rock's population declined. A few houses and the school were all that remained by the 1890s. The school itself was abandoned in the first quarter of the 20th century. The building is now owned by the Jackson County Conservation Board, and serves as a community center. It was listed on the National Register of Historic Places in 1992. The school along with a memorial park and some houses are all that remain in the former town.
