= Henry Roling House =

Historic house in Iowa, United States

- U.S. National Register of Historic Places
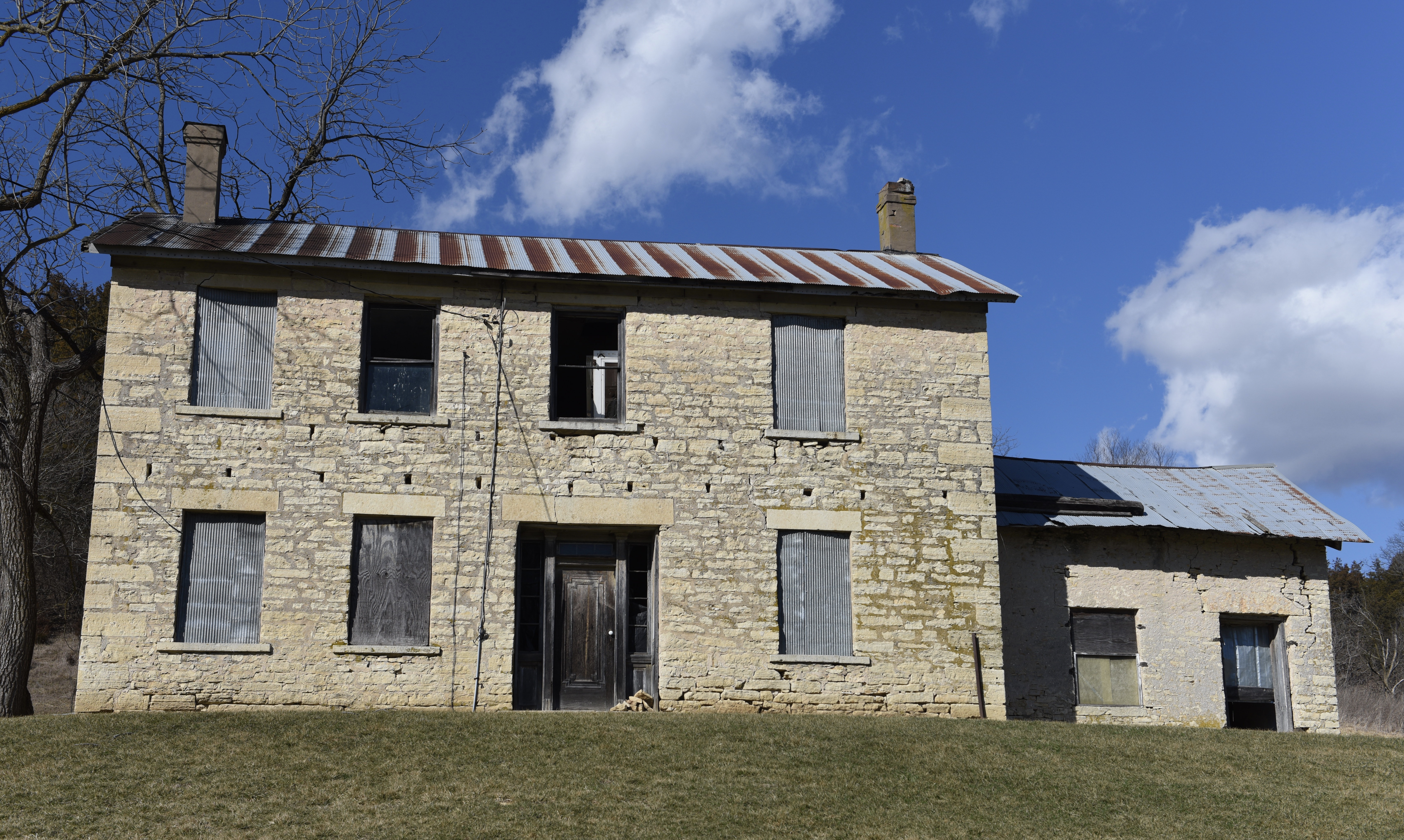

- Location within Iowa Location within the United States
- Location: Spruce Creek Rd. west of its junction with U.S. Route 52
- Nearest city: Bellevue, Iowa
- Coordinates: 42°17′30″N 90°28′42″W
- Area: less than one acre
- Built: 1850
- Architectural style: Vernacular
- MPS: Limestone Architecture of Jackson County MPS
- NRHP reference No.: 91001066
- Added to NRHP: August 30, 1991

The Henry Roling House is a historic building located northwest of Bellevue, Iowa, United States. It is one of over 217 limestone structures in Jackson County from the mid-19th century, of which 101 are houses. It is similar to most of the other houses in that it is a two-story structure that follows a rectangular plan, has cut stones laid in courses, dressed stone sills and lintel, and is capped with a gable roof. This house differs from most of the others in that it is four bays wide rather than three or five. The Theodore Niemann House a mile west of this one is the oldest of the stone houses in the county, and the Roling house, built shortly after it, both similarly being made out of limestone. They are similar to the Luxembourgian houses in the region in having an even number of bays, although the Roling house was not stuccoed. The house was listed on the National Register of Historic Places in 1991.
