= Building at 130–132 North Riverview Street =

- U.S. National Register of Historic Places
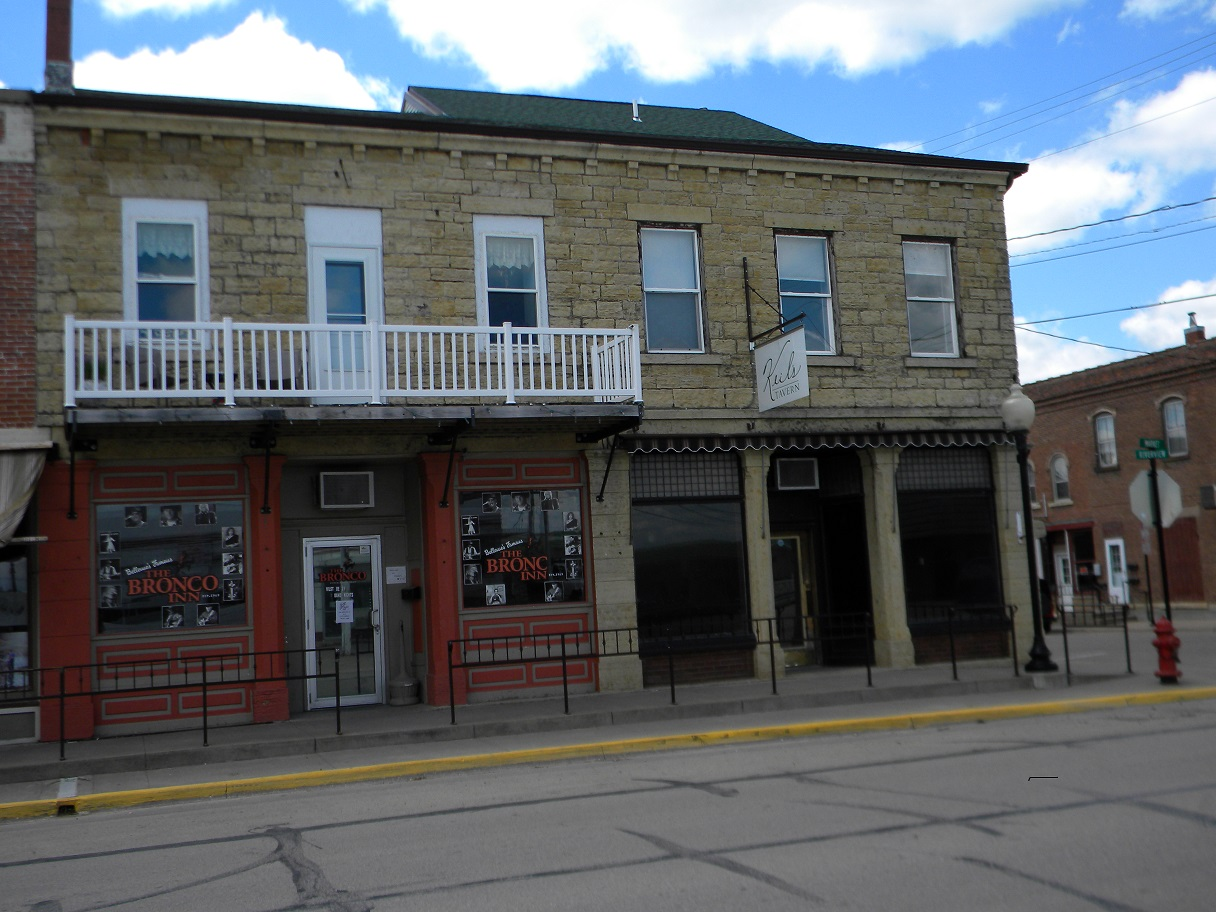

- Location within Iowa Location within the United States
- Location: 130–132 N. Riverview St. Bellevue, Iowa
- Coordinates: 42°15′33″N 90°25′24″W
- Area: less than one acre
- Built: 1855
- Architectural style: Vernacular
- MPS: Limestone Architecture of Jackson County MPS
- NRHP reference No.: 91001069
- Added to NRHP: August 30, 1991

The Building at 130–132 North Riverview Street is a historic commercial building located in Bellevue, Iowa, United States. It is one of over 217 limestone structures in Jackson County from the mid-19th century, of which 20 are commercial buildings. The 2½-story structure was built around 1855 to house retail establishments, which have included dry goods, a grocery, clothing and footwear stores, and a tavern. The double storefront building features three bays on both sides. The stone blocks used in its construction vary somewhat in shape and size, and they were laid in courses. It also features dressed stone lintels. The storefronts were altered in the late 19th and early 20th centuries, but they retain their original limestone piers. What differentiates this building from the others is the gable roof. The second floor balcony on the south half of the building is a recent addition. It storefront has also been altered again in more recent years. The building was listed on the National Register of Historic Places in 1991.
