= Van Buren Township, Jackson County, Iowa =

Township in Jackson County, Iowa, U.S.

Coordinates: 42.0761°N 90.3711°W

Van Buren Township is a township in Jackson County, Iowa, United States.

== History ==
Van Buren Township was established in 1840.
