= St. Patrick's Church (Garryowen, Iowa) =

- St. Patrick's Church-Garryowen
- U.S. National Register of Historic Places
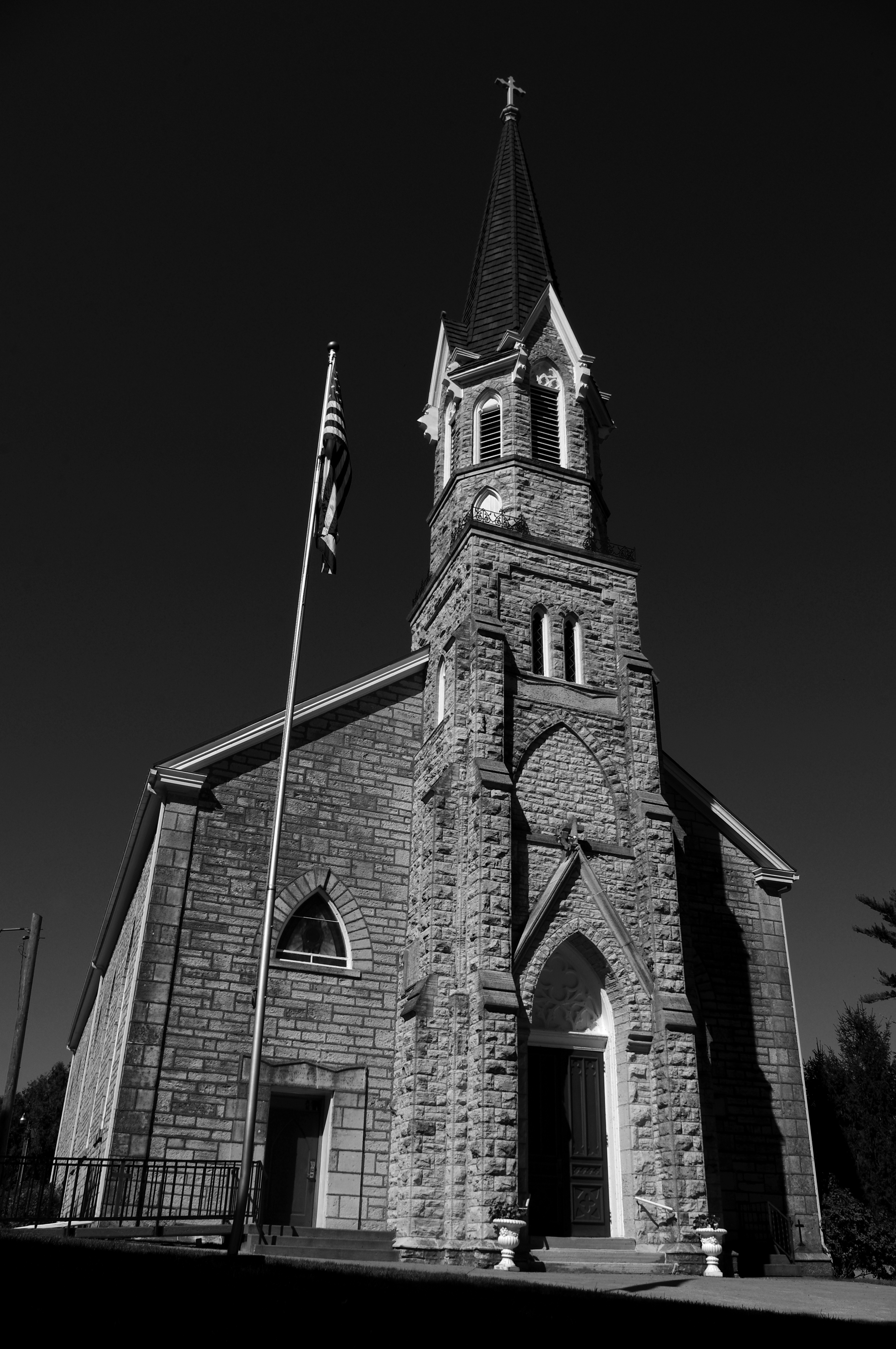

- Location within Iowa Location within the United States
- Location: W. Bellevue-Cascade Rd. (County Road D61) west of Garryowen
- Coordinates: 42°17′7″N 90°50′50″W
- Area: less than one acre
- Built: 1854
- Architect: J. Boland
- Architectural style: Gothic Revival
- MPS: Limestone Architecture of Jackson County MPS
- NRHP reference No.: 92000921
- Added to NRHP: July 24, 1992

St. Patrick's Catholic Church is a parish of the Archdiocese of Dubuque. The church is located in northwest Jackson County, Iowa, United States in an unincorporated community in Butler Township called Garryowen. It was listed on the National Register of Historic Places in 1992.

== History ==
The area known as Garryowen was settled by Irish immigrants from County Limerick and County Cork in 1838-1839. The parish was founded by the Rev. Samuel Charles Mazzuchelli, OP in 1840. At that time there were about 100 Catholics in the area. Three years later there were 600 Catholics, and the parish supported a school. The first church building was a log structure, which was built by parishioners. Bishop Mathias Loras contributed $600 from the Society for the Propagation of the Faith towards its construction.

Six other parishes were created from St. Patrick's. St. Mathias in Cascade, which at one time had been divided into the two parishes of St. Martin's and St. Mary's; St. Joseph's in Bellevue; St. Peter's in Temple Hill; Assumption in Sylvia Switch; St. Aloysius in South Garryowen, and Sacred Heart in Fillmore. St. Patrick's is the second oldest parish and it has the oldest church building in the Dubuque Archdiocese, and it is the oldest Catholic rural parish in Iowa.

== Architecture ==
The present church was built in 1854, minus the tower. It was completed about 1875. Master builder J. Boland is credited with designing the church. The person who designed the tower is unknown, but it is similar in design to Dubuque architect Fridolin Heer's at St. Lawrence Church in Otter Creek. The stone for the church was quarried 3 miles (4.8 km) south of the church, and the lime for the mortar was kilned nearby. The rectangular structure measures 103 by 48 feet (31 by 15 m) with a 118-foot (36 m) projecting tower on the main facade. The tower is capped by an octagon-shaped belfry, also of stone, and a spire. The structure is six bays long, and there is a Gothic arched window in each bay. The main facade provides a symmetrical arraignment of three bays with an entrance portal in each bay.
