= Perry Township, Iowa =

Perry Township may refer to the following townships in the U.S. state of Iowa:

- Perry Township, Buchanan County, Iowa
- Perry Township, Davis County, Iowa
- Perry Township, Jackson County, Iowa
- Perry Township, Plymouth County, Iowa
- Perry Township, Tama County, Iowa

== See also ==
- Perry Township (disambiguation)
