= Nashville, Iowa =

- Unincorporated community
- Location within Iowa Location within the United States
- Coordinates: 42°03′45″N 90°47′02″W
- Country: United States
- State: Iowa
- County: Jackson
- Elevation: 718 ft (219 m)
- Time zone: UTC-6 (Central (CST))
  - Summer (DST): UTC-5 (CDT)
- Area code: 563
- GNIS feature ID: 459438

Nashville is an unincorporated community in Jackson County, in the U.S. state of Iowa.

== Geography ==
Nashville is located at 42°03′45″N 90°47′02″W. It is located at the junction of 33rd Street and 100th Avenue, on the border of Monmouth Township and South Fork Township.

== History ==
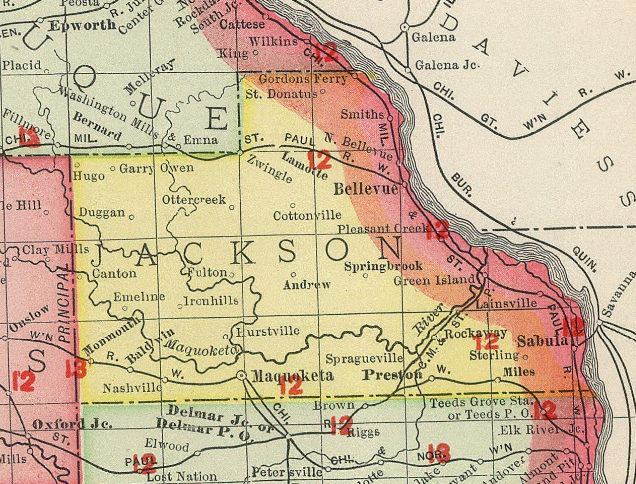
Nashville in Jackson County, Iowa, in 1903

Nashville was founded on the Iowa Midland Railway. By 1910, it had thee general stores, a blacksmith and repair shop, and a church.

Nashville's post office operated from 1871 until 1935. The community was named by an early settler for his native hometown of Nashville, Tennessee.

Nashville's population was 54 in 1902, and 100 in 1925.

In 1940, Nashville's population was 55.

== See also ==
Cottonville, Iowa
