= South Garry Owen, Iowa =

South Garryowen, Iowa
- Unincorporated community
- Location within Iowa Location within the United States
- Coordinates: 42.228426°N 90.805719°W
- Country: United States
- State: Iowa
- County: Jackson
- Elevation: 981 ft (299 m)
- Time zone: UTC-6 (Central (CST))
  - Summer (DST): UTC-5 (CDT)
- Area code: 563
- GNIS feature ID: 461786

South Garryowen is an unincorporated community in Butler Township, Jackson County, Iowa, United States, generally surrounding Saint Aloysius Church.

== See also ==
- Garryowen, Iowa
