= Maquoketa =

Maquoketa can refer to some places in the United States:

- The Maquoketa River in Iowa
- Maquoketa, Iowa, a city
- Maquoketa Township, Jackson County, Iowa
- Maquoketa Caves State Park, near Maquoketa, Iowa
