= Perry Township, Arkansas =

Perry Township, Arkansas may refer to:

- Perry Township, Johnson County, Arkansas
- Perry Township, Perry County, Arkansas

== See also ==
- List of townships in Arkansas
- Perry Township (disambiguation)
