= Farmer Township =

Farmer Township may refer to:

- Farmer Township, Rice County, Kansas
- Farmer Township, Wabaunsee County, Kansas
- Farmer Township, Defiance County, Ohio

== See also ==
- Farmers Township, Fulton County, Illinois
- Farmers Creek Township, Jackson County, Iowa
