= Perry Township, South Dakota =

Perry Township may refer to one of the following places in the State of South Dakota:

- Perry Township, Davison County, South Dakota
- Perry Township, Lincoln County, South Dakota

== See also ==
- Perry Township (disambiguation)
