= Perry Township, Indiana =

Perry Township is the name of fourteen townships in Indiana:

- Perry Township, Allen County, Indiana
- Perry Township, Boone County, Indiana
- Perry Township, Clay County, Indiana
- Perry Township, Clinton County, Indiana
- Perry Township, Delaware County, Indiana
- Perry Township, Lawrence County, Indiana
- Perry Township, Marion County, Indiana
- Perry Township, Martin County, Indiana
- Perry Township, Miami County, Indiana
- Perry Township, Monroe County, Indiana
- Perry Township, Noble County, Indiana
- Perry Township, Tippecanoe County, Indiana
- Perry Township, Vanderburgh County, Indiana
- Perry Township, Wayne County, Indiana

== See also ==
- Perry Township (disambiguation)
