= St. Lawrence Catholic Church (Otter Creek, Iowa) =

- U.S. National Register of Historic Places
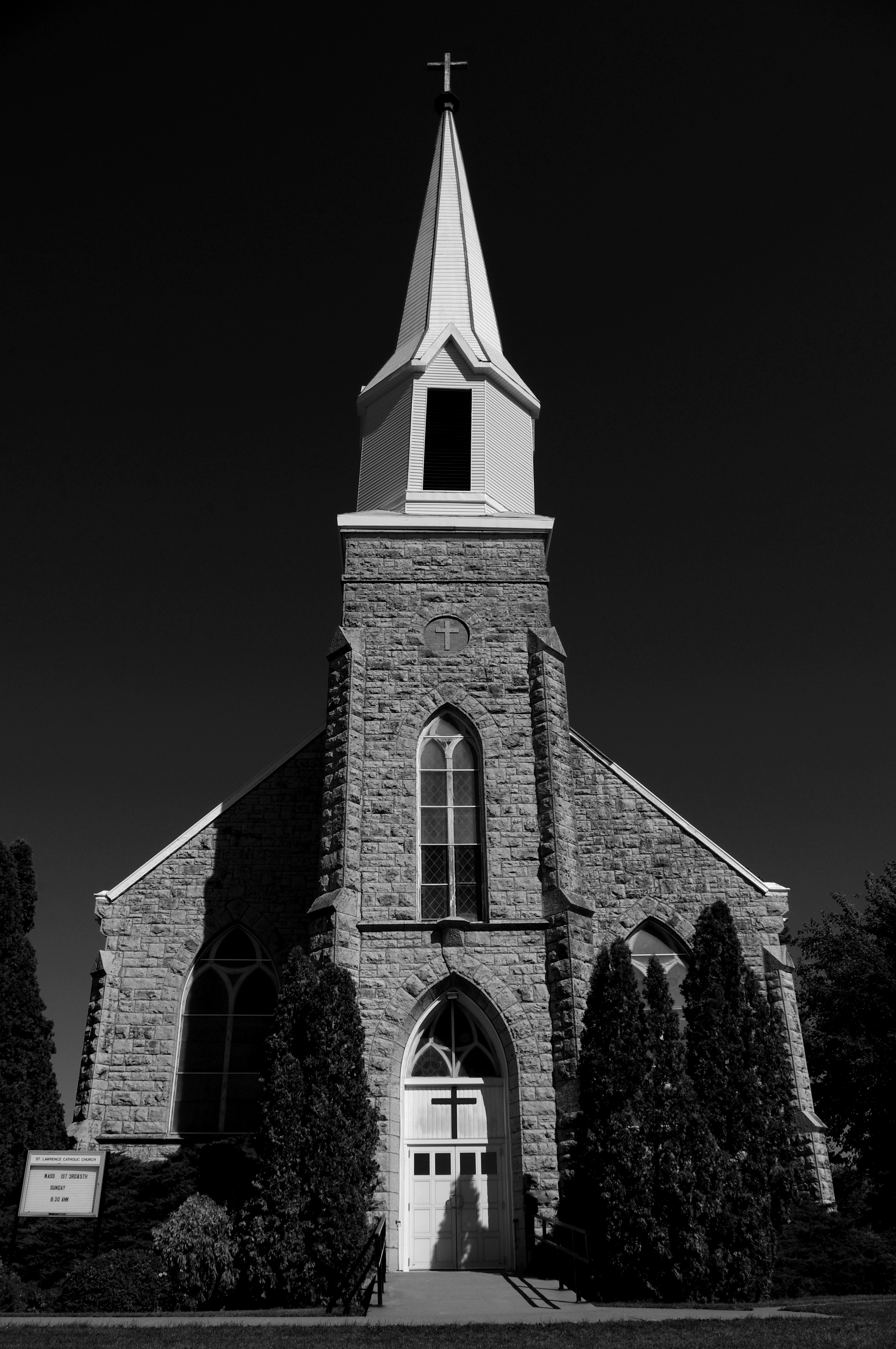

- Location within Iowa Location within the United States
- Location: Bellevue-Cascade Rd. (County Road D61) west of its junction with U.S. Route 61
- Coordinates: 42°14′26″N 90°41′42″W
- Area: Less than one acre
- Built: 1883
- Architect: Fridolin Heer
- Architectural style: Gothic Revival
- MPS: Limestone Architecture of Jackson County MPS
- NRHP reference No.: 92000912
- Added to NRHP: July 24, 1992

St. Lawrence Catholic Church is a parish of the Archdiocese of Dubuque. It is located in rural Jackson County, Iowa, United States, in the unincorporated community of Otter Creek, which is also located in Otter Creek Township. It was listed on the National Register of Historic Places in 1992.

The parish's first church building was a small stone structure completed in 1866. It soon became too small and a frame Methodist Church nearby was bought to house the growing congregation. The present church building, completed in 1883, was designed by Dubuque architect Fridolin Heer. It is constructed in limestone in the Gothic Revival style. The rectangular structure measures roughly 51 by 107 feet (16 by 33 m) with a 15-by-19-foot (4.6 by 5.8 m) projecting tower on the main facade. The tower is capped by an octagon-shaped belfry and spire. There is a Gothic arched window in the tower above the main entrance and in each of the six bays on the sides. The main facade is the south elevation and on the opposite side of the church is a rose window.
