= Fulton, Iowa =

- Unincorporated community
- Location within Iowa
- Coordinates: 42°09′13″N 90°40′41″W
- Country: United States
- State: Iowa
- County: Jackson
- Elevation: 709 ft (216 m)
- Time zone: UTC-6 (Central (CST))
  - Summer (DST): UTC-5 (CDT)
- Area code: 563
- GNIS feature ID: 456803

Fulton is an unincorporated community in Farmers Creek Township, Jackson County, Iowa, United States. The community is located on U.S. Route 61, 5.8 miles (9.3 km) north of Maquoketa.

== History ==
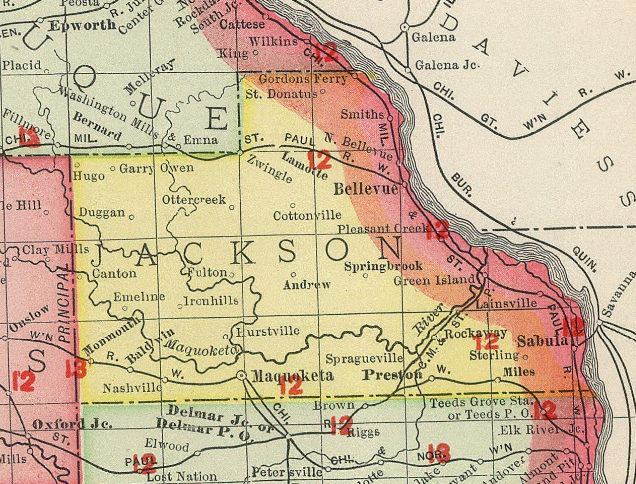
Fulton in Jackson County, Iowa, in 1903

Fulton's population was 146 in 1902. The population was 77 in 1940.
