= Van Buren, Iowa =

- Unincorporated community
- Location within Iowa
- Coordinates: 42°05′04″N 90°21′53″W
- Country: United States
- State: Iowa
- County: Jackson
- Elevation: 682 ft (208 m)
- Time zone: UTC-6 (Central (CST))
  - Summer (DST): UTC-5 (CDT)
- GNIS feature ID: 464783

Van Buren is an unincorporated community in Jackson County, in the U.S. state of Iowa.

== Geography ==
Van Buren is located at 42°05′04″N 90°21′53″W, in Van Buren Township. It is located at the junction of 58th Street and 458th Avenue.

== History ==
The community now known as Van Buren was originally known as Buckeye. The area was first settled by whites in autumn 1837. In the 1840s, this area had just nine farms, according to an 1880 history of the area.

Van Buren's post office (originally named Copper Creek upon its opening in 1849) was renamed Van Buren in 1854 and closed in May 1901.

In 1857, the town of Van Buren was home to two blacksmith shops, one owned by G.A. Otto Schmidt. The population of Van Buren was 44 in 1902.

The Old Van Buren Cemetery is located in the community.

== See also ==
- Garryowen, Iowa
