= Security Building =

Security Building may refer to:

- Security Building (Phoenix, Arizona), listed on the National Register of Historic Places (NRHP)
- Security Building (Los Angeles, California)
- Security Building (Miami, Florida), NRHP-listed
- Security Building (Cedar Rapids, Iowa), NRHP-listed
- Security Building (Dubuque, Iowa), NRHP-listed
- Security Building (St. Louis, Missouri), NRHP-listed
- Security Building (Dunedin), Heritage New Zealand-listed

== See also ==
- Fireproof Building, Charleston, South Carolina, NRHP-listed
