= Brandon Township =

Brandon Township may refer to the following places in the United States:

- Brandon Township, Jackson County, Iowa
- Brandon Township, Michigan
- Brandon Township, Minnesota
- Brandon Township, Minnehaha County, South Dakota
