= Cottonville, Iowa =

- Unincorporated community
- Location within Iowa Location within the United States
- Coordinates: 42°14′13″N 90°36′07″W
- Country: United States
- State: Iowa
- County: Jackson
- Elevation: 997 ft (304 m)
- Time zone: UTC-6 (Central (CST))
  - Summer (DST): UTC-5 (CDT)
- Area code: 563
- GNIS feature ID: 455657

Cottonville is an unincorporated community in Jackson County, Iowa, United States.

== Geography ==
Cottonville is located in Richland Township, at 42°14′13″N 90°36′07″W.

== History ==
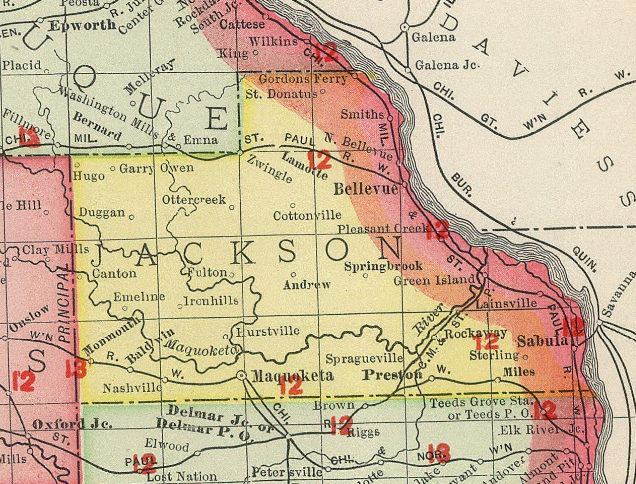
Cottonville in Jackson County, Iowa, in 1903

Cottonville was founded in Richland Township prior to the American Civil War, and was described by historian James Whitcomb Ellis as a "thriving little town" in that era. Cottonville's post office opened in 1850.

The town of Cottonville had two general stores, two shoe shops, a blacksmith, a wagon shop, a grocery store, a post office, and a saloon. The community also boasted a Methodist church. In the early years, the church shared a preacher with nearby Lamotte to the north.

Cottonville's population was 41 in 1902. The town began to decline with the coming of the railroad to nearby Lamotte, and by 1910, there was only one store and the blacksmith shop left in the Cottonville community. The Methodist church in Cottonville was abandoned around this time. The Cottonville post office, which had been open for fifty years, closed in 1900.

== Notable person ==
- Alva L. Hager, Iowa politician and lawyer, lived near Cottonville with his parents.

== See also ==
- Van Buren, Iowa
