= Bellevue Township =

Bellevue Township may refer to the following places in the United States:

- Bellevue Township, Jackson County, Iowa
- Bellevue Township, Eaton County, Michigan
- Bellevue Township, Morrison County, Minnesota
