= Jacob Regez Sr. House =

Historic house in Wisconsin, United States

- U.S. National Register of Historic Places
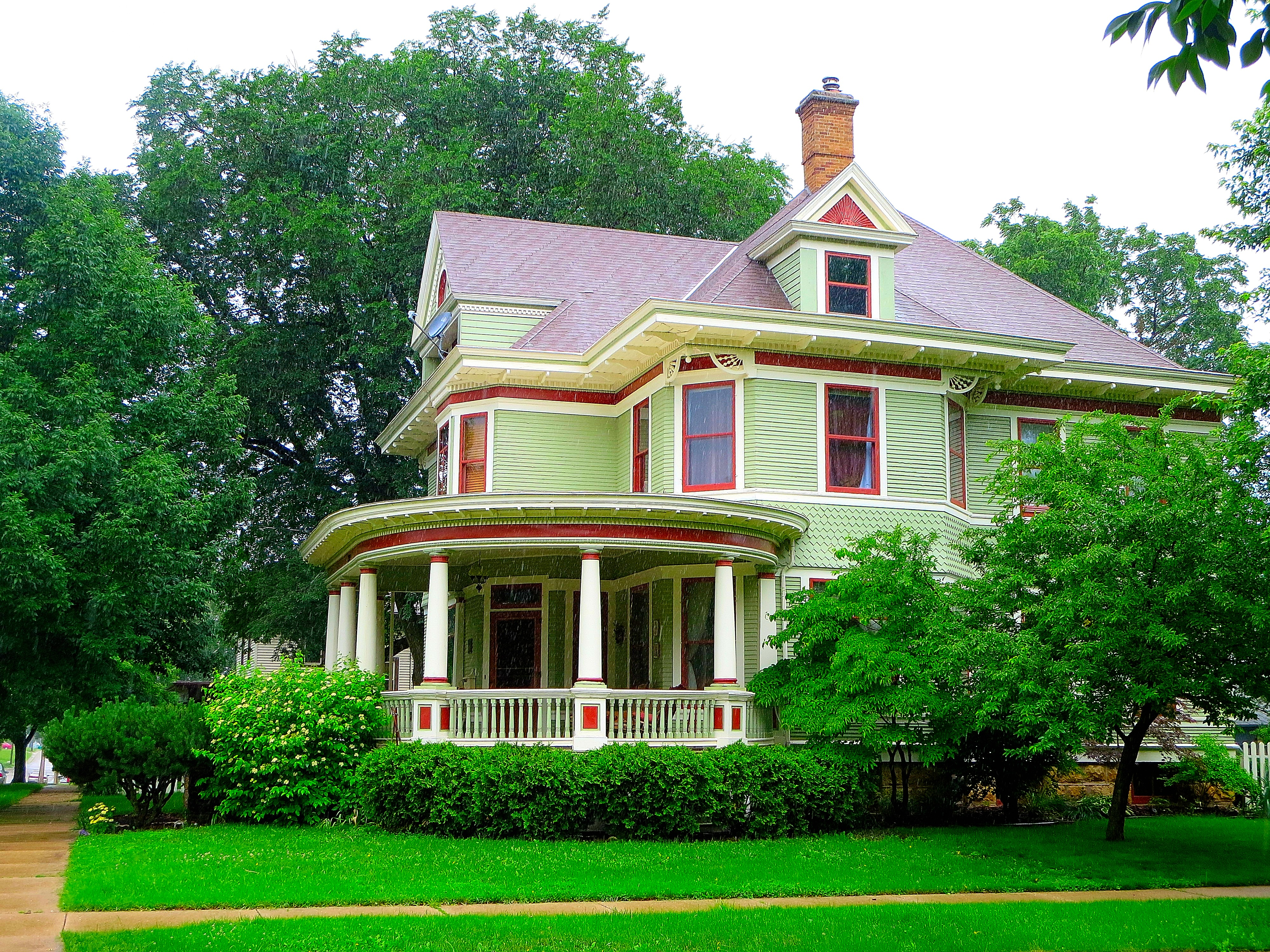

- Location within Wisconsin Location within the United States
- Location: 2121 7th St. Monroe, Wisconsin
- Coordinates: 42°36′19″N 89°37′58″W
- Built: 1901
- Architect: Fridolin Heer
- Architectural style: Queen Anne
- NRHP reference No.: 80000140
- Added to NRHP: January 17, 1980

The Jacob Regez Sr. House is a historic house built in 1901 by an important local cheesemaker in Monroe, Wisconsin, United States. It was added to the National Register of Historic Places on January 17, 1980.

== Description and history ==
Jacob Regez was born in 1849 in the Canton of Bern, Switzerland. His father made cheese, and Jacob learned cheesemaking at a factory scale. In 1872 he emigrated and in 1875 set up a cheesemaking business in Monroe. Soon he had an interest in twenty local cheese factories and operated the large Legler Cheese Factory. Later he was involved in the Monroe Milk Condensing Company.

In 1884 Regez had a Queen Anne-styled house built on the site of the current house, but it was hit by lightning and burned in 1901. Within a week of the fire, Regez hired Fridolin Heer & Son, Swiss architects of Dubuque, to design a replacement. It was finished within six months.

The 1901 house sits on the same limestone foundation as the 1884 house, but the frame structure is a different Queen Anne style design, 2.5 stories with bay windows, broad eaves, pedimented dormers, and a complex roof. On the southeast corner is a large one-story round veranda with its roof supported by seven Doric columns. The walls are clad in narrow clapboard, with bands of sawtooth shingles. Inside are parquet floors, a built-in china cabinet, a tiled fireplace, a mural, stenciling, and an ornate main staircase.

The NRHP considers the house significant as one of the finest historic houses in Monroe, and as an intact example of late Queen Anne architecture. Regez himself was "one of the dominant figures in the development of Monroe's Swiss cheese industry." And the design is an important work of Fridolin Heer. The house has also been listed on the Wisconsin State Register of Historic Places and designated a Monroe Landmark.
