= Dubuque County Courthouse =

- U.S. National Register of Historic Places
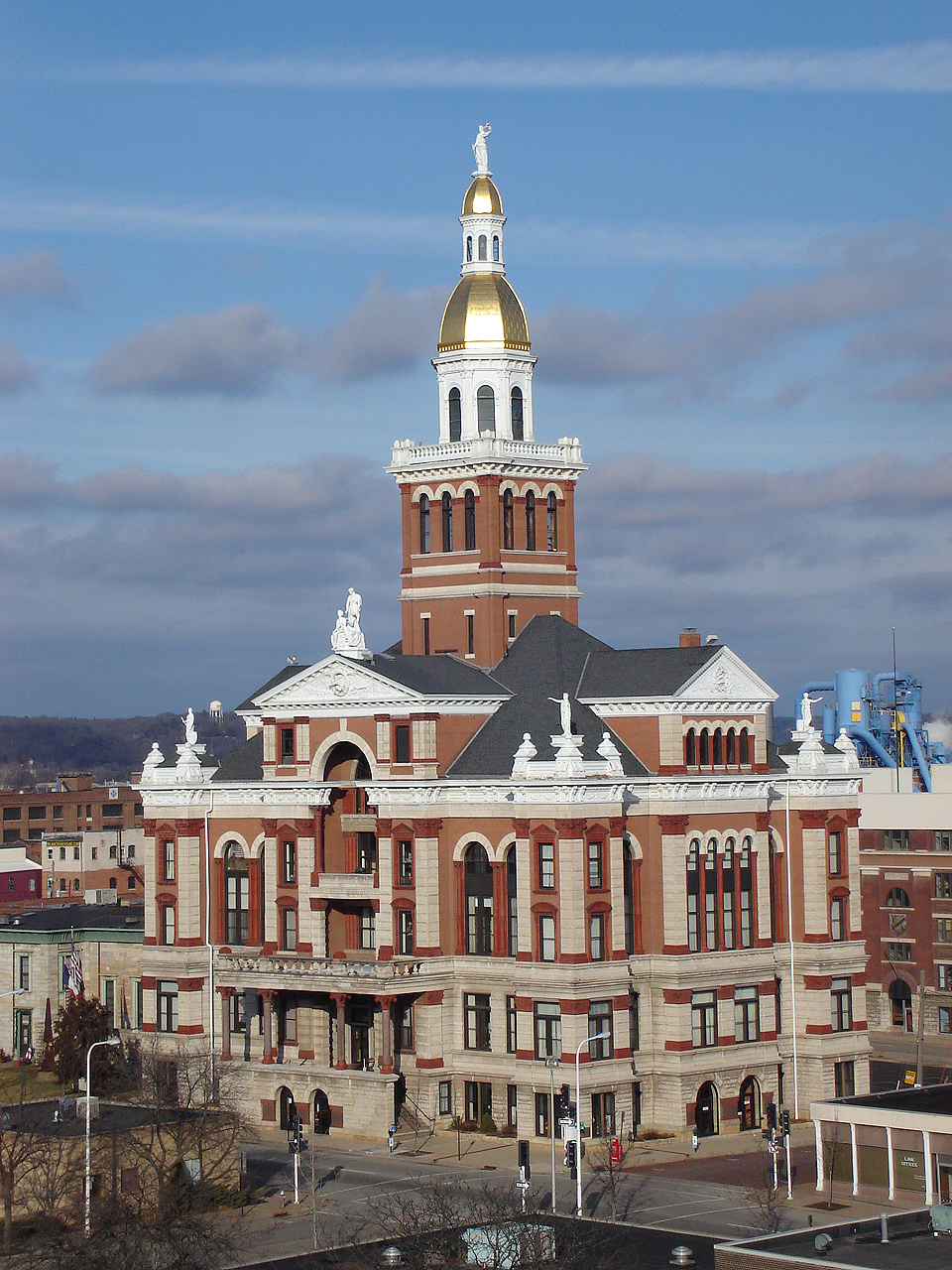

- Location within Iowa
- Interactive map showing the location for Dubuque County Courthouse
- Location: 720 Central Avenue; Dubuque, Iowa
- Coordinates: 42°30′3.4″N 90°39′52.1″W
- Built: 1891-1893
- Architect: Fridolin Heer & Son
- Architectural style: Renaissance; Romanesque
- MPS: County Courthouses in Iowa TR (AD)
- NRHP reference No.: 71000298
- Added to NRHP: June 23, 1971

The Dubuque County Courthouse is located on Central Avenue, between 7th and 8th Streets, in Dubuque, Iowa, United States. The current structure was built from 1891 to 1893 to replace an earlier building. These are believed to be the only two structures to house the county courts and administrative offices.

The courthouse houses several county government offices including the county auditor, treasurer, attorney, and facilities for the Iowa District Court for Dubuque County.

== History ==
Information about the first courthouse in Dubuque is sparse. The first known attempt at a courthouse were the plans for a two-story log structure in 1836, but it was never built. By 1843 it was decided that the increased private business in Dubuque necessitated an increase in public business. Therefore, the county built a red brick building to house its records and offices. It is possible that this building was already under construction as there are records of expenditures for brick, lumber, lime, ironwork, and architectural fees dating back to 1839. An addition was built onto the front of this building in 1856. By 1869 there was talk of building a new courthouse as the county had outgrown this building and it was considered outdated and ill-shaped. Even after a petition for a new courthouse was presented in 1878, there was no serious movement toward construction until 1890.

The United States Congress had authorized the use of Washington Square for the new courthouse, but the choice was made to locate it on the site of the old one. County officials chose local architect Fridolin Heer, designer of Sacred Heart Church and several other notable buildings in the city. Twenty-five year bonds totaling $125,000 were sold in April 1891, and the cornerstone was laid on July 11 of the same year. The building was completed two years later.

The Dubuque County Courthouse was listed on the National Register of Historic Places in 1971. Its significance is derived from its association with county government, and the political power and prestige of Dubuque as the county seat. The adjacent Dubuque County Jail is a National Historic Landmark.

== Architecture ==
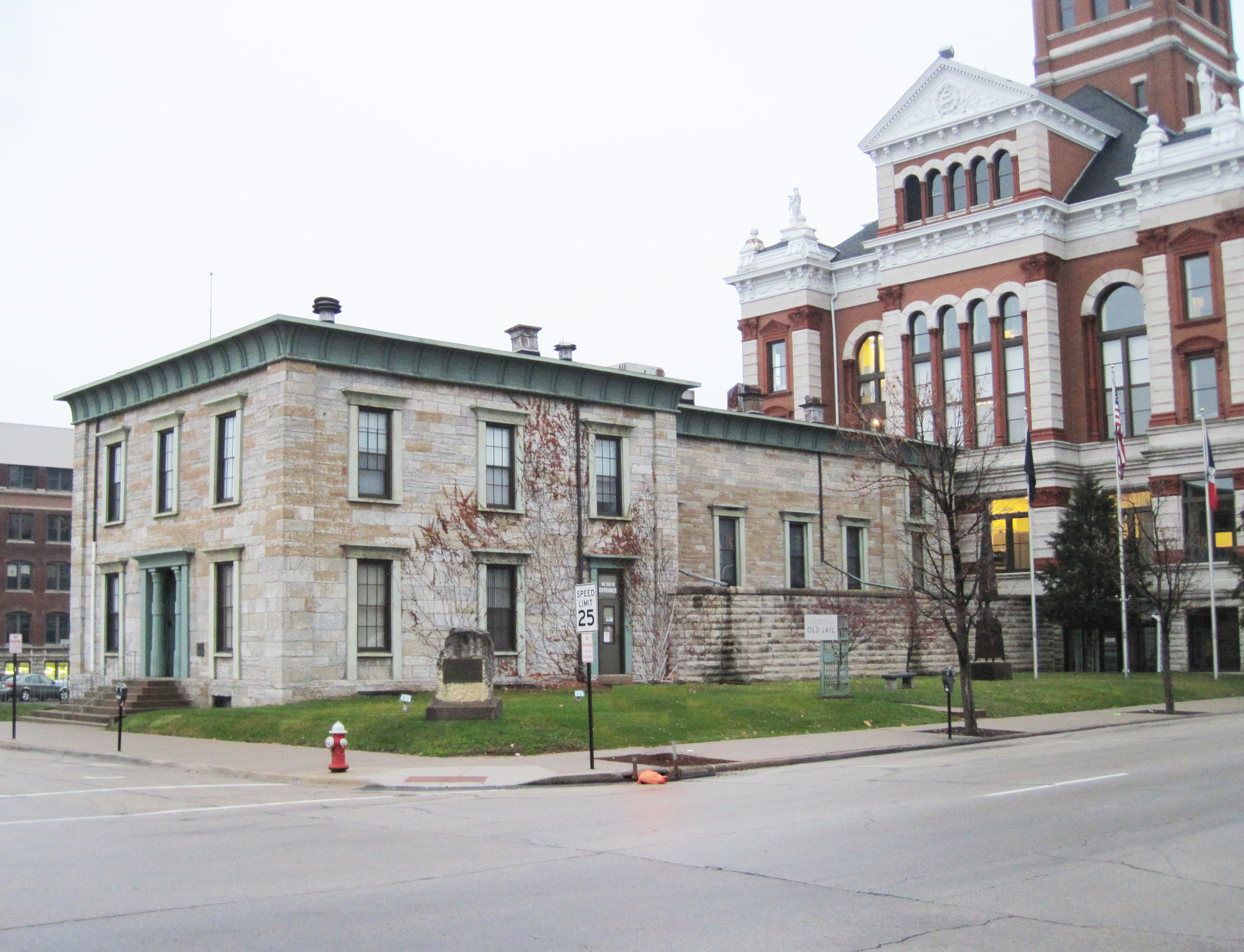
Historic Dubuque County Jail with courthouse on right

Heer designed the structure in the Beaux-Arts style with elements of the Renaissance and the Romanesque styles. It is constructed of Bedford limestone on the first floor and red brick and molded terra cotta on the floors above. The frieze is composed of galvanized iron or zinc. The building has a footprint of 88 by 125 feet (27 m × 38 m). It is five-stories topped by a central tower surmounted by a 14-foot (4.3 m) statue of Justice. All total, the building rises to a height of 213 feet (65 m). Upon completion, 12 classic statues of laminated pewter adorned the roof, however only six remain. Some reports say the others were removed during World War I to provide materiel for the war effort. The interior features the shaft of the tower that terminates on the fourth floor with a dome of stained glass. Woodwork and fittings are of oak with carvings that are done in a Richardsonian character.

=== Renovations ===
Renovations were done to the building over the years, especially in the 1980s. Changes include the installation of a glass elevator, a granite fountain was placed on the ground floor, and the entrances into the building were moved to the ground level from the second floor. Gold leaf was applied to the tower dome. Given the various weather conditions, it did not hold and it had to be repaired. The county reevaluated security at the courthouse following the murders of a judge in Georgia and a judge's family in Illinois. All entrances, but one, were closed and visitors and their possessions were screened.

== See also ==
- List of Iowa county courthouses
