= Union Township, Jackson County, Iowa =

Township in Jackson County, Iowa, U.S.

Coordinates: 42.0783°N 90.1894°W

Union Township is a township in Jackson County, Iowa, United States.

== History ==
Union Township was established in 1840.
