= Iowa Township, Jackson County, Iowa =

Township in Jackson County, Iowa, U.S.

Coordinates: 42.1067°N 90.2586°W

Iowa Township is a township in Jackson County, Iowa, United States.

== History ==
Iowa Township was established in 1855.
