= Prairie Springs Township, Jackson County, Iowa =

Human settlement in Iowa, USA

Coordinates: 42.2027°N 90.3622°W

Prairie Springs Township is a township in Jackson County, Iowa, United States. As of 2010, the township has a population of 627.

== History ==
Prairie Springs Township was established in 1840.
