= Washington Township, Jackson County, Iowa =

Township in Jackson County, Iowa

Coordinates: 42.162°N 90.367°W

Washington Township is a township in Jackson County, Iowa, United States. It was organized from areas of the original Bellevue and Van Buren Townships. Washington Township is 25,536 acres or 39.9 square miles with 2.2 square miles covered with water. The landscape includes numerous lakes and streams including the Maquoketa River.

== History ==
Washington Township was established in 1851.
