= Town Clock (Dubuque, Iowa) =

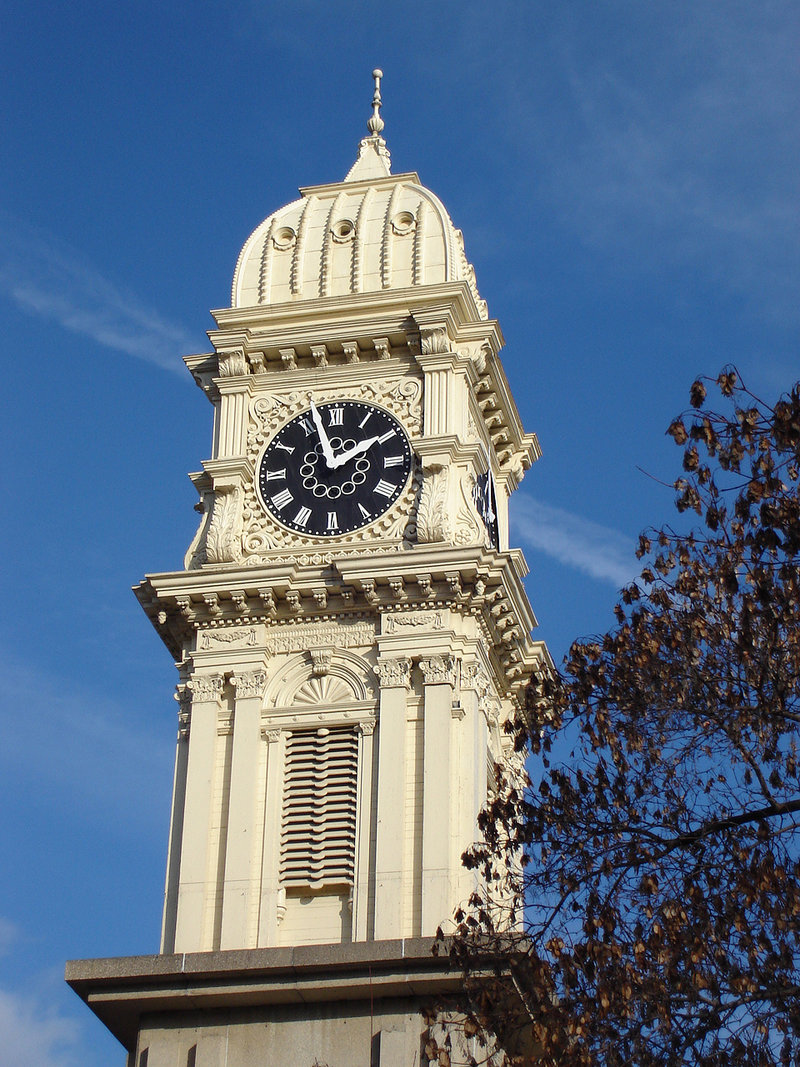
The clock in 2006

The Town Clock is a large clock that stands in downtown Dubuque, Iowa. The clock has stood over the city for over 140 years. The present clock is the second "Town Clock"; the first collapsed in the 1870s, killing three people. The building on which it originally stood is listed on the National Register of Historic Places, but the clock tower itself is not.

== History ==
=== The First Town Clock ===
Dr. Asa Horr began the fundraising effort to build a town clock in Dubuque, Iowa in 1864. The clock was built by New York City's Naylor & Co. and its frame was designed by architect William Longhurst. George D. Wood gave a ten-year lease to the city for the clock to be placed on the John Bell and Company Store building which they owned. The building had originally housed a Congregational church and then "The Odeon", a German theater. That was followed by the post office, and then a concert hall before it became the home of the John Bell Company. This first clock was placed on a tower of the building at a cost of $3,000. All men who had pledged at least $25 formed the Dubuque Town Clock Company to oversee its maintenance.

On May 25, 1872, several people noticed cracks forming in the walls of the store building. Workers attempted to clear the location where they expected the clock to fall. At 5:16 PM, both the clock and the John Bell store collapsed, killing a child and two women who were inside the store at the time. An investigation into the matter reported that the foundation of the Bell Store was not sufficient to handle the clock's weight. It was also reported that construction next door was the primary cause of the accident. Losses from the disaster were estimated to be between $15,000 and $20,000.

=== The Second Town Clock ===
- Town Clock Building
- U.S. National Register of Historic Places
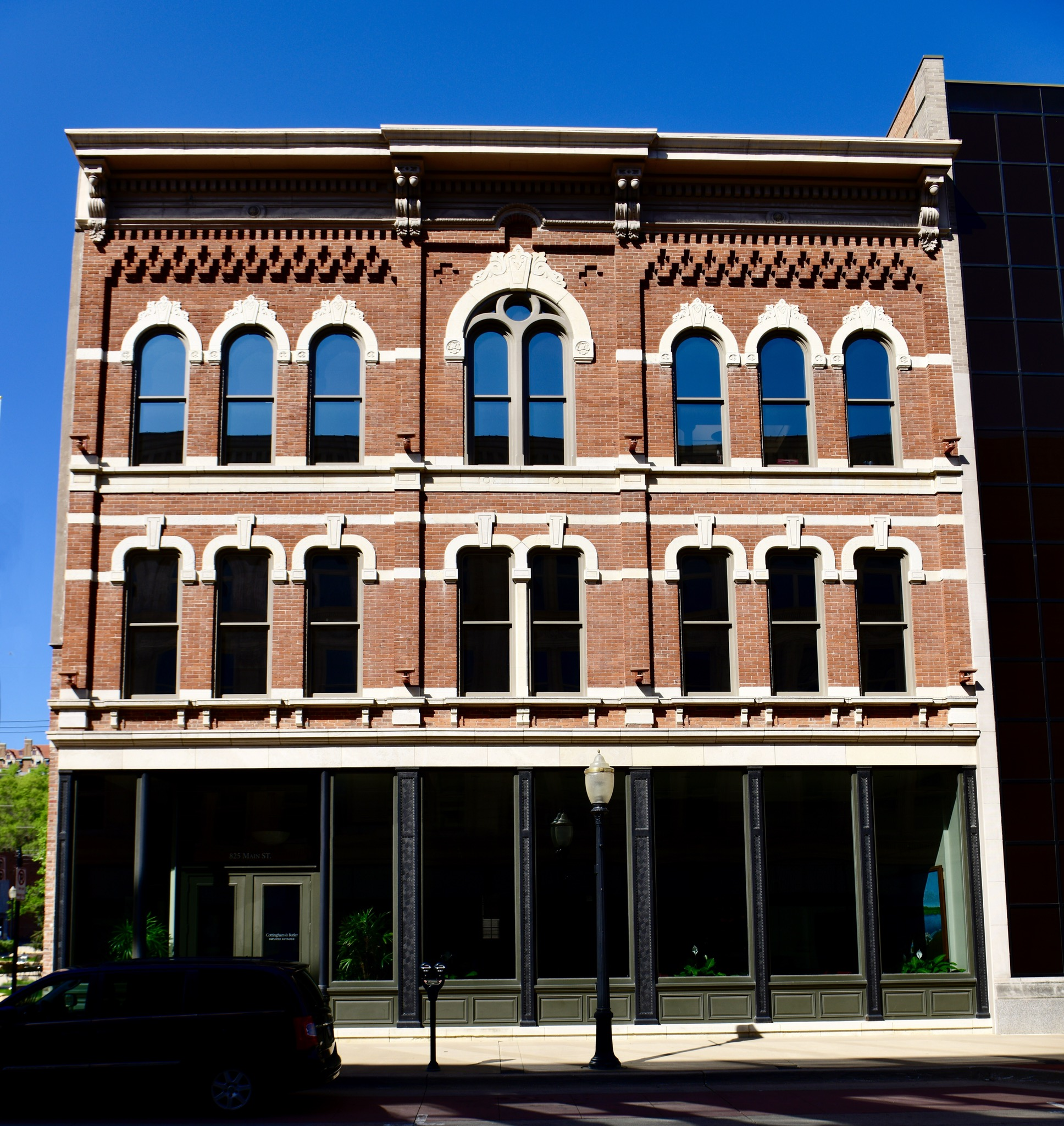
- The present town clock was originally located on top of this building.

- Location within Iowa Location within the United States
- Location: 823-25 Main St. Dubuque, Iowa
- Coordinates: 42°30′03.7″N 90°40′03.5″W
- Area: less than one acre
- Built: 1873
- Built by: L.T. Farwell
- Architects: Fridolin J. Heer, Sr. Edward Naescher
- Architectural style: Italianate
- NRHP reference No.: 01001488
- Added to NRHP: January 24, 2002

==== Town Clock Building ====
Dubuque residents soon decided to replace the collapsed Town Clock. George Wood, who had owned the collapsed building, wanted the new town clock on his property, but John Bell was not interested in being a part of the project. Wood decided to build the new building on his own, while the tower was paid for through subscriptions. He cleared the remainder of the collapsed building and the neighboring Dr. Lay residence. A partnership between architects Fridolin Heer, Sr. and Edward Naescher designed the new building, as well as plans for a new three-story tower. A three-story brick Italianate building was designed to support the tower, which rose 58 feet (18 m) above the building.

The city paid the $5,309.46 cost for the new clock, which began operating on April 17, 1873. The bell, which weighs over 4,200 pounds (1,900 kg), was cast by Naylor & Co. and the clock was built by Boston firm Howard & Co. Time was recorded via a subterranean transit instrument which was used to observe the passage of stars. This provided accurate time readings to within half of a second and was always kept accurate within two seconds.

For a number of years, the clock had a mechanical movement. Two employees spent an hour and a half winding cranks that were attached to the weights, which would allow the clock to operate for one week. In 1923, the Town Clock was almost dismantled when the financial cost of repairs led the city council to decide to remove the clock. However, the council changed their minds when a poll found that a majority of citizens favored keeping and maintaining it. In 1927, the clock was electrified by Interstate Power Company when a new Seth Thomas movement was placed in the clock. Western Union then synchronized the clock.

==== Urban Renewal ====
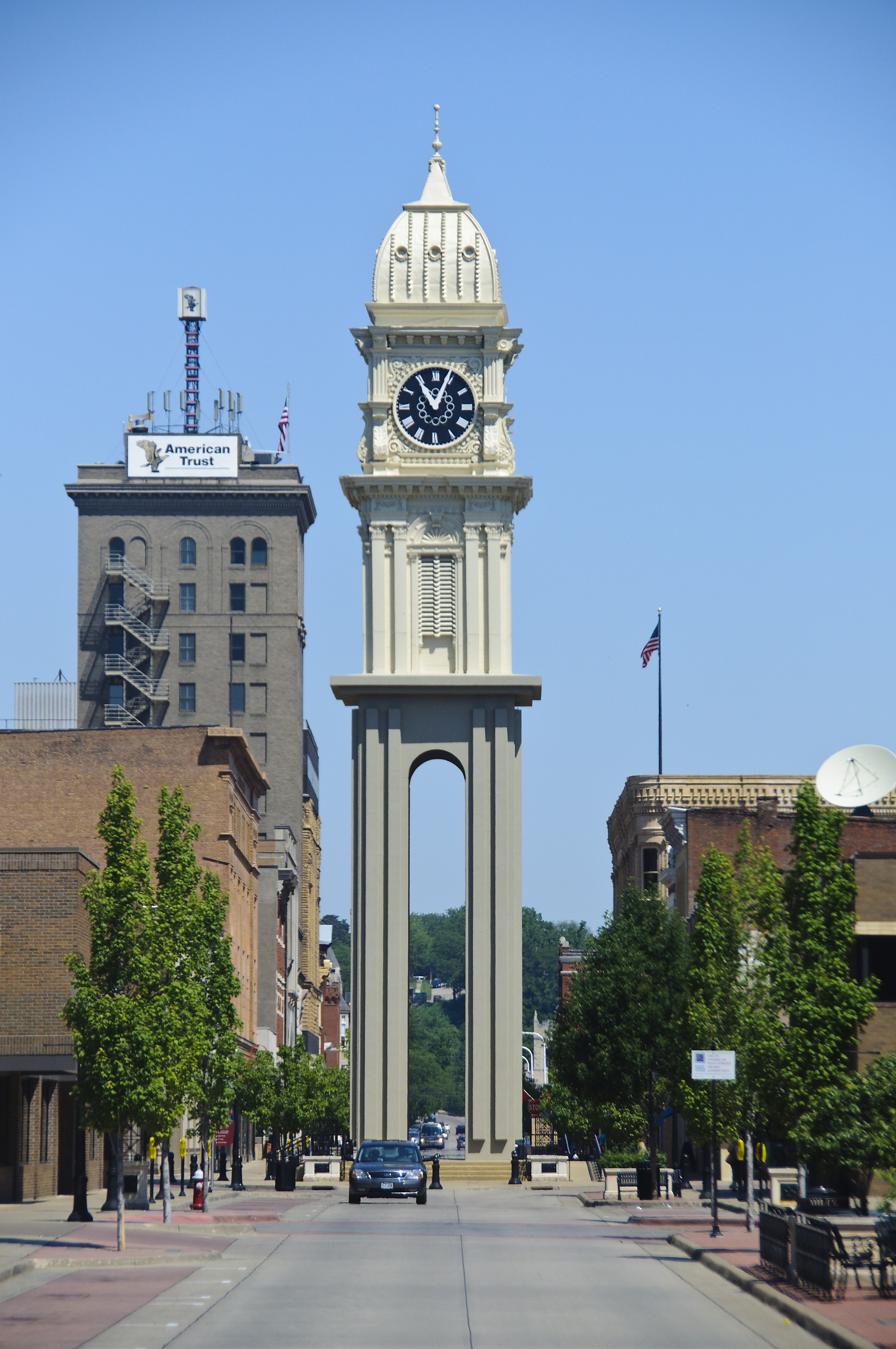
The clock as seen from Main Street

With the urban renewal trend in the 1970s, the "Your Town Clock Committee" was organized. Their goal was to have the clock moved from its location at 825 Main Street to the new Town Clock Plaza, which the city council approved. The cost for the move was $70,000, which was raised through donations raised over a 14-month period.

The Durrant Architecture firm of Dubuque designed a precast four-column pedestal that was then placed in the plaza. The actual tower was brought to the site on Feb 12, 1971, and bolted to the pedestal. The faces of the clock were placed at the new location on Feb 16, 1971. Afterwards the cupola was placed at the new site, which completed the move. After the reassembly was complete, the clock stood about 108 feet above the street, which was about two feet taller than at its previous location.

The move helped increase the visibility of the Town Clock, where it now served as the centerpiece at special events held at Town Clock Plaza. Otherwise, most of the traffic had moved out to the west end of the city. Main street had become an office park. In 1989, concerns were voiced about vibrations made by loud music and dancers possibly causing damage to the pedestal or the clock. The city studied the problem and stated its confidence that the Town Clock was structurally sound.

==== Recent events ====
In recent years, Main Street from Fifth street to Ninth street was reopened to automobile traffic after it was determined that the pedestrian plaza no longer was an effective option for the downtown area. This would have left the Town Clock standing in the middle of Main Street, but a small traffic circle was built around the clock. The clock continues to stand as a distinctive Dubuque landmark. Due to the cold it was frozen at 7:33, however it has been operational year round for several years.
