= Fairfield Township, Jackson County, Iowa =

Township in Jackson County, Iowa, U.S.

Coordinates: 42.0731°N 90.4822°W

Fairfield Township is a township in Jackson County, Iowa, United States.

== History ==
Fairfield Township was established in 1845.
