= Tete Des Morts Township, Jackson County, Iowa =

Township in Jackson County, Iowa

Coordinates: 42.3361°N 90.4778°W

Tete Des Morts Township is a township in Jackson County, Iowa, USA.

== History ==
Tete Des Morts Township was established in 1840.
