= Jackson Township, Jackson County, Iowa =

Township in Jackson County, Iowa, U.S.

Coordinates: 42.1658°N 90.4933°W

Jackson Township is a township in Jackson County, Iowa, United States.

== History ==
Jackson Township was established in 1845.
