= Garryowen, Iowa =

- Unincorporated community
- Location within Iowa Location within the United States
- Coordinates: 42°17′00″N 90°49′54″W
- Country: United States
- State: Iowa
- County: Jackson
- Elevation: 1,040 ft (320 m)
- Time zone: UTC-6 (Central (CST))
  - Summer (DST): UTC-5 (CDT)
- Area code: 563
- GNIS feature ID: 464556

Garryowen or Garry Owen is an unincorporated community in Butler Township, Jackson County, Iowa, United States, generally surrounding St. Patrick's Church.

== Geography ==
Garryowen is located at the junction of County Roads D61 and Y31 (Bernard Road). It is in Section 3 of Butler Township.

== History ==
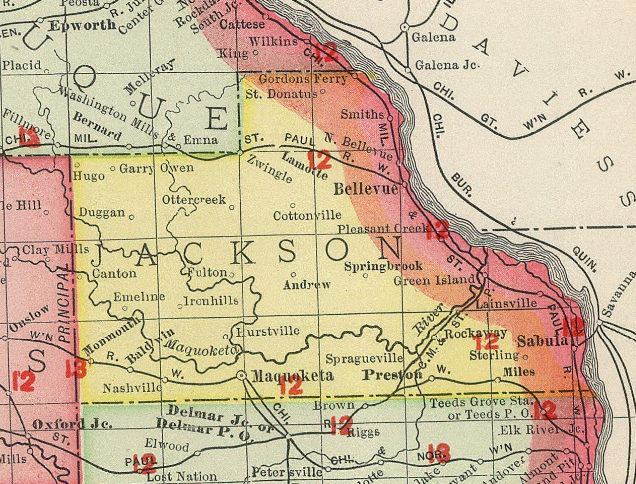
Garry Owen in Jackson County, Iowa, in 1903

The settlement was founded by Irish immigrants in the late 1830s, who first named it Makokiti. It was part of a wave of Catholic settlement encouraged by Mathias Loras, Bishop of Dubuque. His associate, missionary Samuel Charles Mazzuchelli, founded a log church there in 1840 with funds from the Society for the Propagation of the Faith. When St. Patrick's Church was completed, it had about 100 parishioners; the 42 men of the congregation had aided in its construction. By 1842, the congregation had 600 members and had a school and resident pastor. The school was probably the first Catholic school in the Archdiocese of Dubuque. Mazzuchelli noted in 1844 that there were no Protestants in Butler Township.

Dennis A. Mahony, an instructor at the school and a future member of the Iowa Senate, suggested that the name of the community be changed to Garryowen (after Garryowen, Limerick) to reflect the community's Irish heritage. In 1854, the congregation built a stone church, today recognized on the National Register of Historic Places. The school closed in 1871 after the Sisters of Charity of the Blessed Virgin Mary were unable to secure funding to continue it. Seven parishes in nearby communities stemmed off of St. Patrick's. The post office, founded in 1847, was discontinued in 1900.

Garryowen's population was 36 in 1902.

== See also ==
- Fulton, Iowa
