= Fridolin Heer =

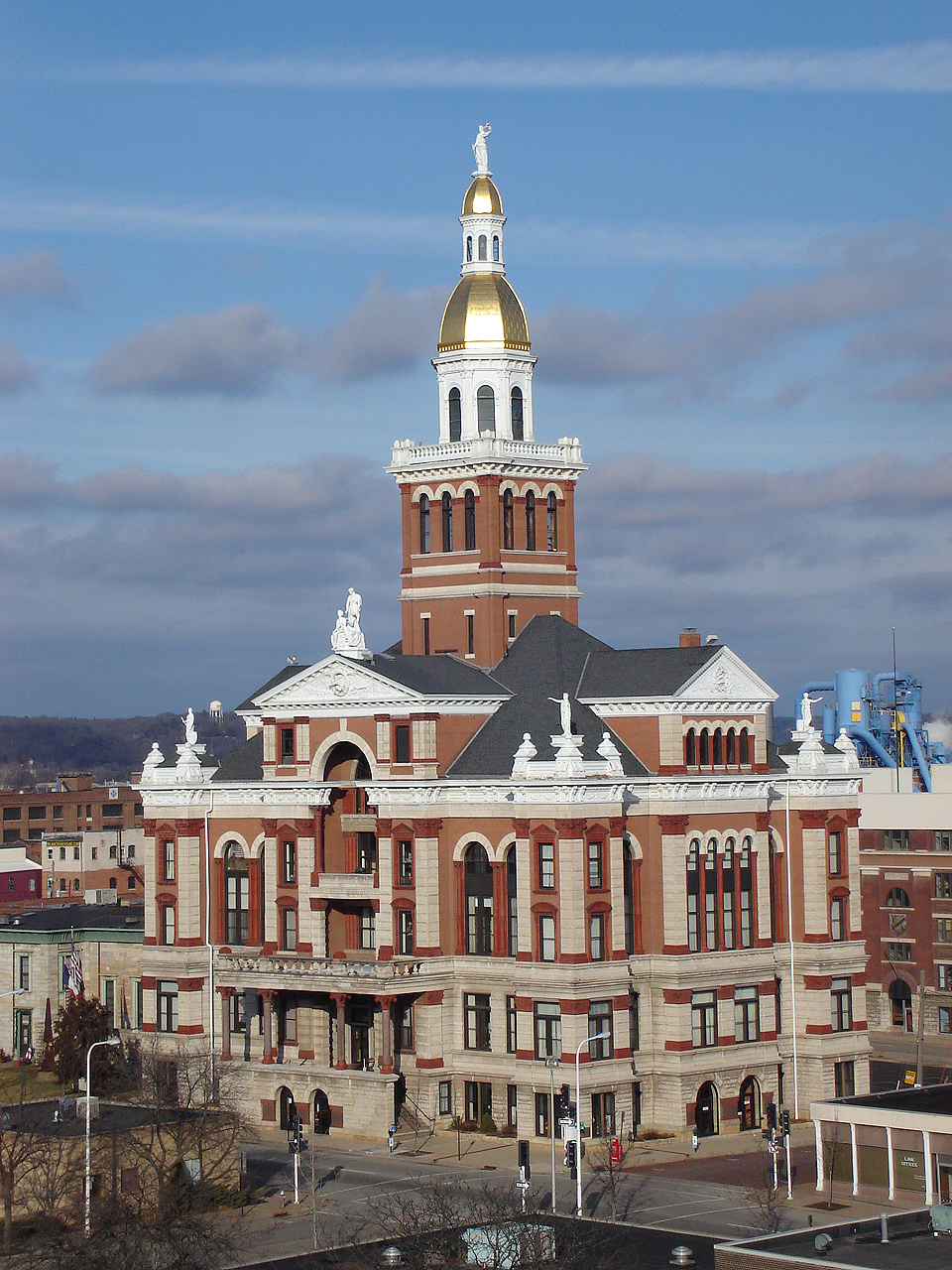
Dubuque County Courthouse

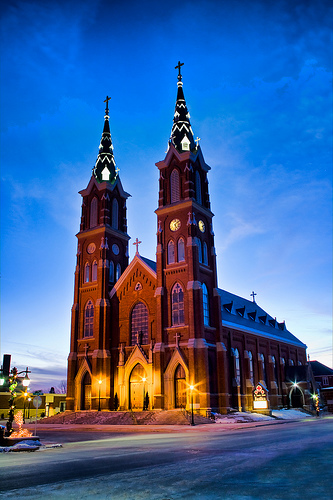
Basilica of St. Francis Xavier

Fridolin Heer (July 30, 1834 – September 19, 1910) was a Swiss-born and trained architect who migrated to the United States in 1864 and set up a practice in Dubuque, Iowa, shortly thereafter. He was joined in his practice by his son, Fridolin Heer Jr.

Fridolin Heer Jr. studied architecture in Germany and worked in Chicago in the offices of Adler and Sullivan before returning to Dubuque to work with his father.

Heer died at his home in Dubuque in 1910.

== Works ==
Buildings by Fridolin Heer and his son include:

- Andrew-Ryan House, Dubuque (1873)
- Town Clock Building, Dubuque (1873)
- Corpus Christi Catholic Church, Fort Dodge, Iowa (1882)
- St. Boniface Catholic Church, Westphalia, Iowa (1882)
- Blessed Sacrament Chapel at St. Raphael's Cathedral, Dubuque (1882)
- St. Lawrence Catholic Church, Otter Creek Township, Jackson County, Iowa (1883)
- Sacred Heart Catholic Church, Dubuque (1888)
- Basilica of St. Francis Xavier, Dyersville, Iowa (1889)
- Dubuque County Courthouse, Dubuque (1893)
- Security Building, Dubuque (1896)
- Jacob Regez, Sr. House, Monroe, Wisconsin (1901)
