= Maquoketa Caves State Park murders =

Triple murder in Jackson County, Iowa

Coordinates: 42°07′11″N 90°46′38″W

Maquoketa Caves State Park Murders
- Location: Maquoketa Caves State Park, Jackson County, Iowa, U.S
- Date: July 22, 2022 (CDT)
- Target: Schmidt family
- Attack type: Mass shooting, stabbing, strangulation
- Weapons: Homemade firearm and sharp object
- Deaths: 4 (including the perpetrator)
- Perpetrator: Anthony Orlando Sherwin

On July 22, 2022, three members of the Schmidt family were murdered in Maquoketa Caves State Park in Iowa. The assailant, identified as 23-year-old Anthony Orlando Sherwin, later committed suicide by gunshot.

== Murders ==
Shortly before 6:23 a.m. on July 22, 2022, an assailant murdered three members of the Schmidt family. The father Tyler, 42, was shot multiple times and stabbed to death and the mother Sarah, 42, was stabbed multiple times until she died. The couple's daughter, six-year-old Lula, died from a gunshot wound and strangulation. The couple's nine-year-old son Arlo was the sole survivor of the attack.

Authorities received a phone call notifying them of the triple homicide at about 6:23 a.m. After arriving at the scene and discovering the victims, they temporarily closed the park to investigate. After evacuating the campgrounds, police learned that the only registered camper that was unaccounted for was Anthony Orlando Sherwin, 23, a resident from La Vista, Nebraska. At the time, they did not know whether he was the perpetrator or another victim, but did know that he was armed.

At 11:00 a.m., Sherwin's body was found by a plane used by law enforcement to search for him. Sherwin had died from a self-inflicted gunshot wound west of the campground and was shortly identified by law enforcement as a suspect in the case.

== Investigation ==
The motive for the shooting is still unknown. There is no known connection between the Schmidt family and Sherwin (although the survivor by chance, happened to run to Sherwin’s mother, and use her phone to call the police) and authorities believe that the shooting was a random attack.

On August 4, the Iowa Department of Public Safety released the autopsy reports. The causes of death include a combination of gunshot wounds, multiple sharp force injuries, and strangulation. The report concluded, "However, the known facts and circumstances, and all evidence collected to this point, substantiate Sherwin was the perpetrator of the homicides and acted alone."" The Quad-City Times and the Dispatch-Argus filed requests for numerous records related to the shooting under the Freedom of Information Act and Iowa's open records law. The request was denied by the Iowa Department of Public Safety.

== Aftermath ==
Camp Shalom, a Christian summer camp about a mile and a half away from where the shooting took place, was safely evacuated at 9:15 a.m.

== Reactions ==
Shortly after the incident, the surviving parents of the alleged shooter disputed the allegations against their son, who had no criminal record. “We think (Anthony) might have sensed trouble and grabbed the gun for safety,” Cecilia Sherwin said. “We refuse to believe the news. We are deeply saddened as he had so much to live for and gave us no indication that anything was wrong.” A young boy ran up to the Sherwins’ campsite yelling for help and told her that a man wearing black had shot his family, she said. Cecilia Sherwin said her son was wearing green, not black, and no black clothing was found in the area.

Kim Reynolds, the governor of Iowa, made a statement about the shooting, saying “I’m horrified by the shooting this morning at Maquoketa Caves State Park and devastated by the loss of three innocent lives. As we grieve this unimaginable tragedy, Kevin and I pray for the victims’ family members and the law enforcement officers who responded to the scene. We ask Iowans to do the same.” Representatives Ashley Hinson, Cheri Bustos, and Senator Chuck Grassley made similar statements.
