= Monmouth Township, Jackson County, Iowa =

Township in Jackson County, Iowa, U.S.

Coordinates: 42.0764°N 90.8408°W

Monmouth Township is a township in Jackson County, Iowa, United States.

== History ==
Monmouth Township was established in 1843. The township was named in commemoration of the Battle of Monmouth in the American Revolutionary War.
