= Security Building (Dubuque, Iowa) =

- U.S. National Register of Historic Places
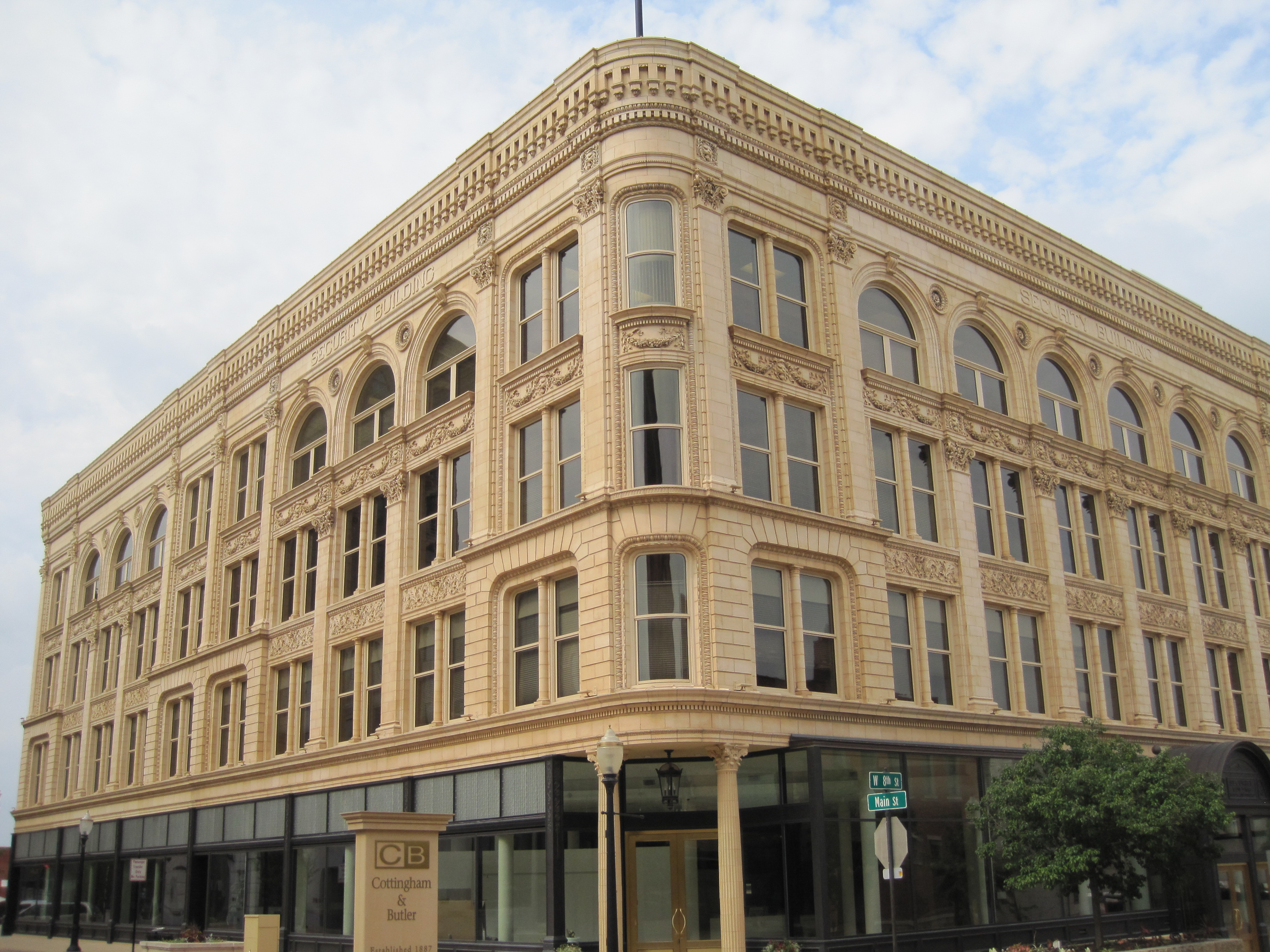

- Location within Iowa Location within the United States
- Location: 800 Main St. Dubuque, Iowa
- Coordinates: 42°30′4″N 90°40′1″W
- Area: less than one acre
- Built: 1896
- Architect: Fridolin J. Heer & Son, Thomas Carkeek
- Architectural style: Beaux Arts
- MPS: Dubuque, Iowa MPS
- NRHP reference No.: 06000681
- Added to NRHP: August 8, 2006

The Security Building, also known as the Stampfer Building, is a historic structure in Dubuque, Iowa, United States. The cream-colored building is associated with the J. F. Stampfer Co. department store.

== History ==
Dan A. Sullivan founded a dry goods store with Paul Kees in 1877. When Kees died in 1883, he was replaced with Joseph Frederick Stampfer. The store originally operated in the Town Clock Building. Stampfer formed a partnership with F. W. Altman to raise stock for the construction of a new building in 1895. In 1896, the firm commissioned the southern half of the Security Building. Across the street from the Town Clock Building, the Security Building sat on the central block of town. A grand opening was held on September 22. Household goods were sold on the third floor, millinery and other clothing was on the second floor, and women's attire was on the first floor. The fourth floor was probably used as a warehouse.

Stampfer himself designed the interior of the structure while Fridolin J. Heer & Son were commissioned to design the exterior. The design, with its cream terra cotta exterior, was a departure from other Dubuque brick-and-stone architecture. The original plan was the double the size of the building in 1898; however, for unknown reasons, this did not happen. Sullivan retired in 1901 and the firm became known as the J. F. Stampfer Company. The northern half was added in 1907, designed by Thomas Carkeek. The upper floors of this half of the store were leased out to the Boston One Price Clothing Store and the Harger & Blish booksellers. Stampfer occupied all of the first floor. The store occupied the building through the late 1960s. Thomas M. Stampfer, the son of Joseph, assumed the presidency following Joseph's death in 1937. He changed the name of the building to the Stampfer Building.

The building was recognized by the National Park Service with a listing on the National Register of Historic Places on August 8, 2006.
