= Brandon Township, Jackson County, Iowa =

Township in Jackson County, Iowa, U.S.

Coordinates: 42.1731°N 90.8294°W

Brandon Township is a township in Jackson County, Iowa, United States.

== History ==
Brandon Township was established in 1843.
