= Bellevue Township, Jackson County, Iowa =

Township in Jackson County, Iowa, U.S.

Coordinates: 42.2439°N 90.4689°W

Bellevue Township is a township in Jackson County, Iowa, United States.

== History ==
Bellevue Township was established in 1840.
