= Maquoketa Caves State Park =

State park in Iowa, USA

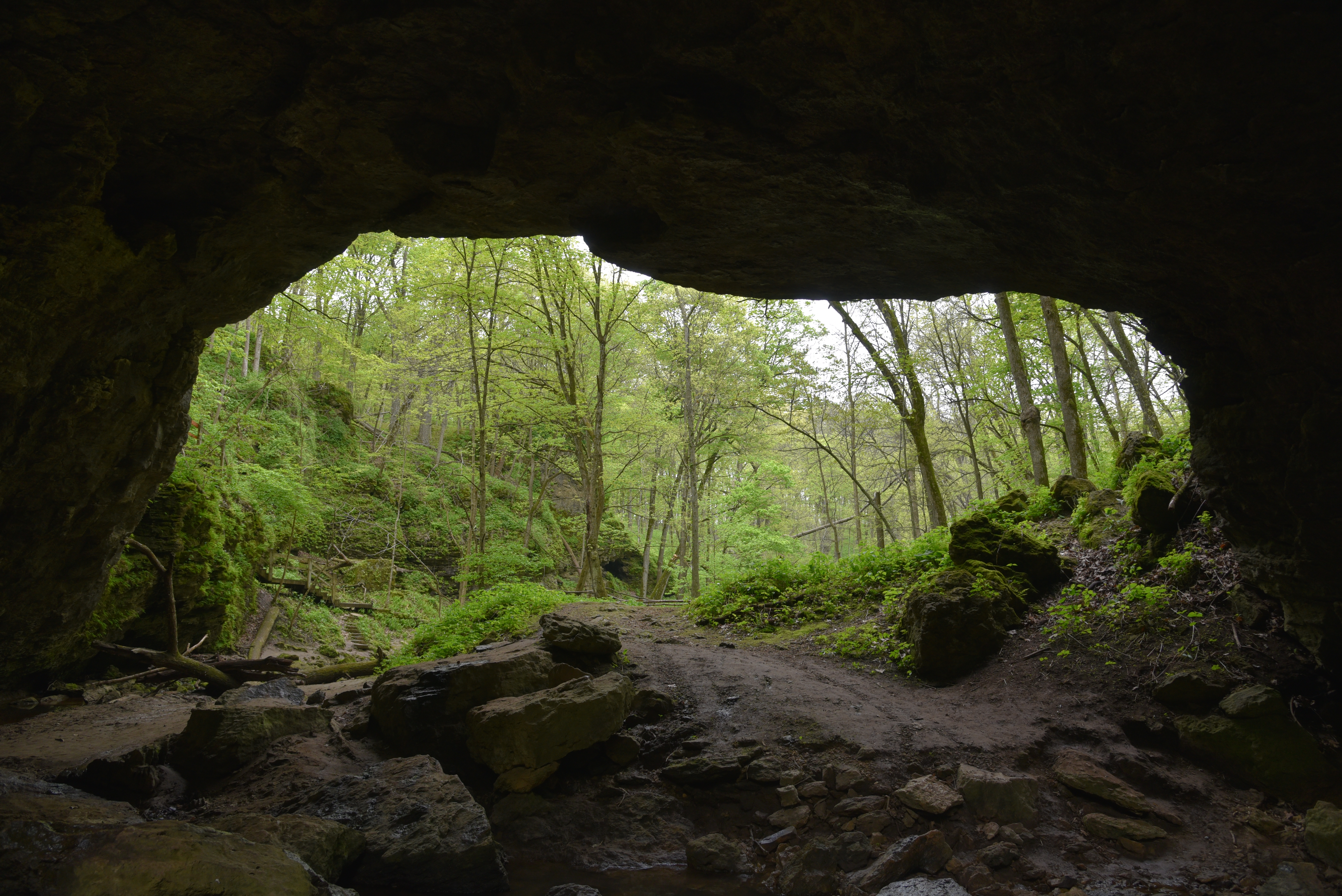

- Location within Iowa Location within the United States
- Location: Jackson County, Iowa, United States
- Coordinates: 42°07′02″N 90°46′51″W
- Area: 323 acres (131 ha)
- Elevation: 791 ft (241 m)
- Established: 1921
- Administrator: Iowa Department of Natural Resources
- Website: Official website
- Maquoketa Caves State Park; Historic District
- U.S. National Register of Historic Places
- U.S. Historic district
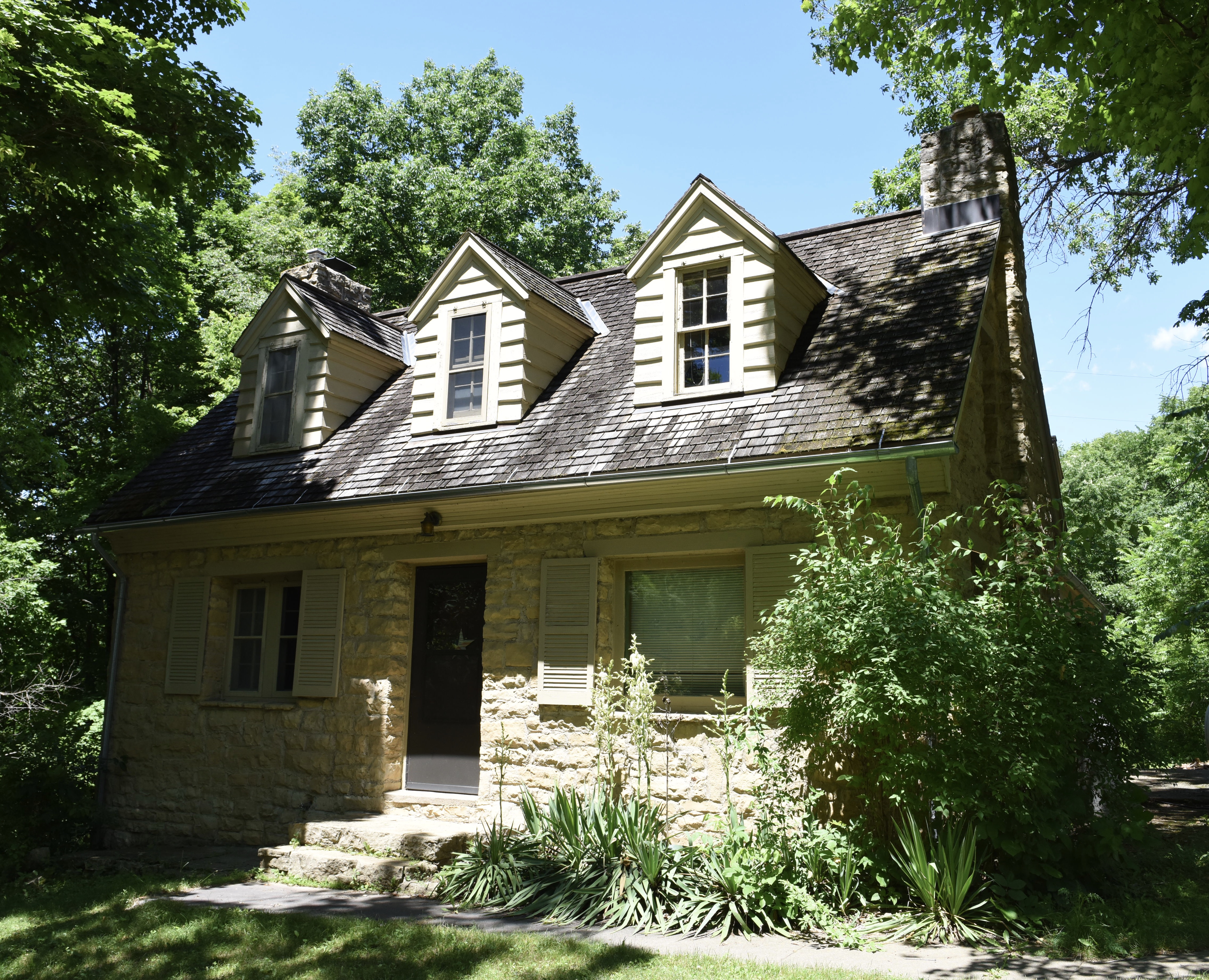
- Custodian Residence
- Area: 111 acres (45 ha)
- Built: 1932-1939
- Architect: John R. Fitzsimmons; Lincoln Jorgensen
- Architectural style: Rustic
- MPS: Conservation Movement in Iowa MPS
- NRHP reference No.: 91001843
- Added to NRHP: December 23, 1991

Maquoketa Caves State Park is a state park of Iowa, United States, located in Jackson County. It stands northwest of the city of Maquoketa. In 1991, 111 acres (45 ha) on the east side of the park were listed as a historic district on the National Register of Historic Places.

== Description ==
The park contains more caves than any other state park in Iowa. A trail system links the caves, formations, and overlooks while providing a scenic hiking experience. Many areas on these trails have seen new construction, making the journey to the caves safer. Most of the caves may be entered by persons of average physical ability, but some are more advanced. However the park's caves were closed to humans between 2010 and April 2012 in the hopes of protecting the resident bats from white nose syndrome.

The park is in the Driftless Area of Iowa. This region escaped being glaciated in the last ice age, while regions to the east and west were not spared. The park has been subjected to hundreds of thousands of years of natural non-glacial erosion.

The park's caves, limestone formations and rugged bluffs represent a step back in geological time of thousands of years. Stalactites once hung from the ceilings and stalagmites rose from the floor. Souvenir hunters have robbed the caves of this rare beauty, but many formations remain. The park's limestone caves, arches and chimneys including Dancehall Cave, Hernado's Hideaway, Shinbone Cave, Wye Cave, and an unmarked cave within the Dancehall Cavern locally known as Steelgate Cave.

The park's interpretive center, formerly known as Sager’s Museum, has displays on the geology of cave formations and park history.

== History ==
Artifacts such as pottery, as well as tools and projectile points made of stone have been found in the caves and surrounding area. These discoveries indicate that the Maquoketa Caves area has been of interest to humans for hundreds, perhaps thousands, of years. Early recorded history tells that the Native Americans in the area were likely visitors to the Raccoon Creek valleys. The first Euro-American explorers first visited the caves as late as the mid-1830s. The area was originally known as Morehead Caves or Burt's Cave. It had become a popular place for exploration, picnics, parties, and dances by the 1860s. A dance floor was constructed north of Natural Bridge in 1868, and a pavilion, which was used until the 1920s, was built sometime later. By the turn of the 20th century the area had become seriously degraded, and its popularity declined.

The first park land was purchased in 1921 by the Maquoketa Women's Club for the purposes of establishing a state park. Originally called Morehead Caves State Park, its name was changed to Maquoketa Caves in 1928. Additional land was acquired in 1931. The majority of the park facilities were constructed from 1932 to 1939 by the Civilian Conservation Corps (CCC) and the Works Progress Administration (WPA). Both programs resulted from the federal government effort to make work for Americans during the Great Depression. Their work makes up the contributing properties of the historic district. They include three CCC overlook shelters, the entrance portals, the custodian's residence, the shelter house/concession building, the stone picnic circle, and two stone latrines. The noncontributing structures in the park include the CCC/WPA cave improvements, the CCC/WPA trail system, the park ranger's residence, a picnic shelter, and two wood-frame latrines. State Landscape Architect John Fitzsimmons designed the custodian's residence. It and the other historic structures designed by the Central Design Office in Ames, Iowa were built in the Rustic style, which was promulgated by the National Park Service in the 1930s as being appropriate for parks.

In 1944, the Maquoketa River flooded with a historic discharge of 48,000 cubic feet per second. Several of the caves were inundated with the water carving holes up to eight feet deep and damaging the lighting system. Repairs were conducted over several years and completed in 1949.

The State of Iowa purchased an additional 161 acres (65 ha) on the west side of the park between 1961 and 1981. This section was dedicated as a nature preserve.

In the early morning of July 22, 2022, three members of a family were murdered at the park's campground. The assailant, identified as 23-year-old Anthony Sherwin of Nebraska, later committed suicide.

== In popular culture ==
The park was once featured on an episode of Rescue 911 when a story was done on a hiker who had fallen and was seriously injured while at the park. The hiker was saved by paramedics and the Maquoketa volunteer fire department.

== See also ==
- List of Iowa state parks
