= Richland Township, Jackson County, Iowa =

Township in Jackson County, Iowa, United States

Coordinates: 42.2511°N 90.6072°W

Richland Township is a township in Jackson County, Iowa, United States.

== History ==
Richland Township was established in 1846.
