= South Fork Township, Jackson County, Iowa =

Township in Jackson County, Iowa, U.S.

Coordinates: 42.0714°N 90.7347°W

South Fork Township is a township in Jackson County, Iowa, United States.

== History ==
South Fork Township was established in 1845.
