= Otter Creek, Iowa =

- Unincorporated community
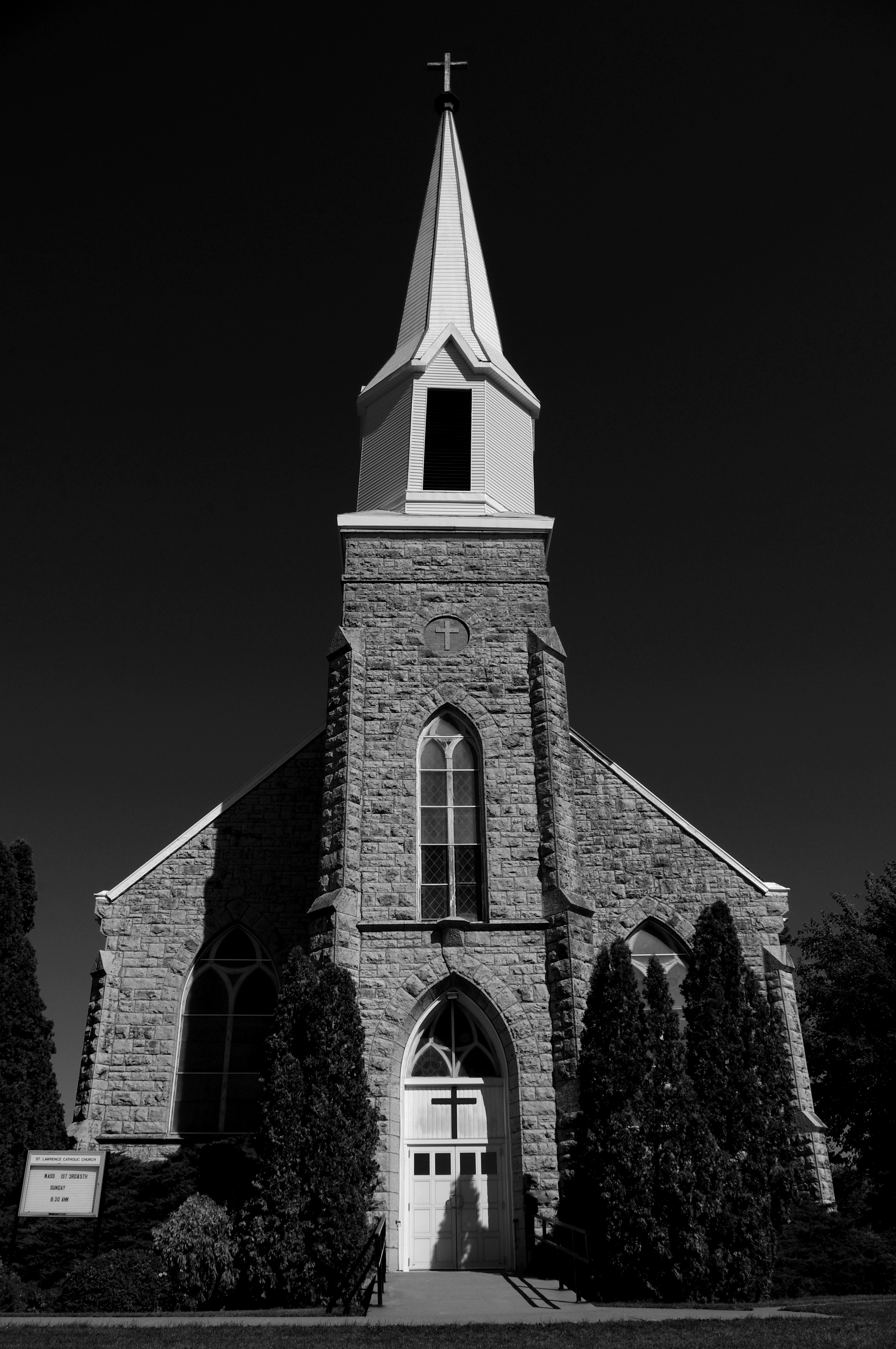
- St. Lawrence Catholic Church

- Location within Iowa Location within the United States
- Coordinates: 42°14′26″N 90°40′57″W
- Country: United States
- State: Iowa
- County: Jackson
- Elevation: 1,020 ft (310 m)
- Time zone: UTC-6 (Central (CST))
  - Summer (DST): UTC-5 (CDT)
- Area code: 563
- GNIS feature ID: 464688

Otter Creek is an unincorporated community in Jackson County, Iowa, United States. The community is situated along U.S. Route 61, 12 miles (19 km) north of Maquoketa.

== History ==
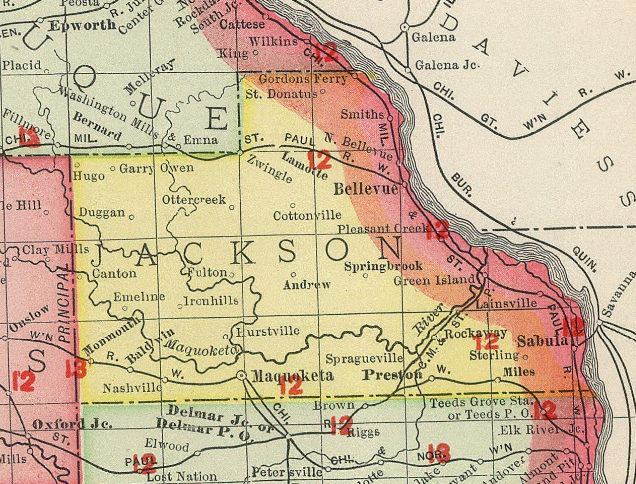
Otter Creek in Jackson County, Iowa, in 1903

The St. Lawrence Catholic Church, which is listed on the National Register of Historic Places, is located in Otter Creek. The population was 13 in 1940.
