= Maquoketa Township, Jackson County, Iowa =

Township in Jackson County, Iowa, U.S.

Coordinates: 42.0775°N 90.6108°W

Maquoketa Township is a township in Jackson County, Iowa, United States.

== History ==
Maquoketa Township was established in 1845.
