= Otter Creek Township, Jackson County, Iowa =

Township in Jackson County, Iowa, U.S.

Coordinates: 42.2400°N 90.7283°W

Otter Creek Township is a township in Jackson County, Iowa, United States.

== History ==
Otter Creek Township was established in 1846.
