= Farmers Creek Township, Jackson County, Iowa =

Township in Jackson County, Iowa, U.S.

Coordinates: 42.1642°N 90.7233°W

Farmers Creek Township is a township in Jackson County, Iowa, United States.

== History ==
Farmers Creek Township was established in 1840.
