= Perry Township, Jackson County, Iowa =

Township in Jackson County, Iowa, U.S.

Coordinates: 42.1642°N 90.6078°W

Perry Township is a township in Jackson County, Iowa, United States.

== History ==
Perry Township was established in 1840.
