= Butler Township, Jackson County, Iowa =

Township in Jackson County, Iowa, U.S.

Coordinates: 42.2489°N 90.8297°W

Butler Township is a township in Jackson County, Iowa, United States.

== History ==
Butler Township was established in 1840.
