= Perry Township =

Perry Township may refer to:

== Canada ==
- Perry, Ontario

== United States ==
=== Arkansas ===
- Perry Township, Johnson County, Arkansas, in Johnson County, Arkansas
- Perry Township, Perry County, Arkansas, in Perry County, Arkansas

=== Illinois ===
- Perry Township, Pike County, Illinois

=== Indiana ===
- Perry Township, Allen County, Indiana
- Perry Township, Boone County, Indiana
- Perry Township, Clay County, Indiana
- Perry Township, Clinton County, Indiana
- Perry Township, Delaware County, Indiana
- Perry Township, Lawrence County, Indiana
- Perry Township, Marion County, Indiana
- Perry Township, Martin County, Indiana
- Perry Township, Miami County, Indiana
- Perry Township, Monroe County, Indiana
- Perry Township, Noble County, Indiana
- Perry Township, Tippecanoe County, Indiana
- Perry Township, Vanderburgh County, Indiana
- Perry Township, Wayne County, Indiana

=== Iowa ===
- Perry Township, Buchanan County, Iowa
- Perry Township, Davis County, Iowa
- Perry Township, Jackson County, Iowa
- Perry Township, Plymouth County, Iowa
- Perry Township, Tama County, Iowa

=== Kansas ===
- Perry Township, Woodson County, Kansas, in Woodson County, Kansas

=== Michigan ===
- Perry Township, Michigan

=== Minnesota ===
- Perry Township, Lac qui Parle County, Minnesota

=== Missouri ===
- Perry Township, St. Francois County, Missouri

=== Nebraska ===
- Perry Township, Thurston County, Nebraska

=== North Dakota ===
- Perry Township, Cavalier County, North Dakota, in Cavalier County, North Dakota

=== Ohio ===
- Perry Township, Allen County, Ohio
- Perry Township, Ashland County, Ohio
- Perry Township, Brown County, Ohio
- Perry Township, Carroll County, Ohio
- Perry Township, Columbiana County, Ohio
- Perry Township, Coshocton County, Ohio
- Perry Township, Fayette County, Ohio
- Perry Township, Franklin County, Ohio
- Perry Township, Gallia County, Ohio
- Perry Township, Hocking County, Ohio
- Perry Township, Lake County, Ohio
- Perry Township, Lawrence County, Ohio
- Perry Township, Licking County, Ohio
- Perry Township, Logan County, Ohio
- Perry Township, Monroe County, Ohio
- Perry Township, Montgomery County, Ohio
- Perry Township, Morrow County, Ohio
- Perry Township, Muskingum County, Ohio
- Perry Township, Pickaway County, Ohio
- Perry Township, Pike County, Ohio
- Perry Township, Putnam County, Ohio
- Perry Township, Richland County, Ohio
- Perry Township, Shelby County, Ohio
- Perry Township, Stark County, Ohio
- Perry Township, Tuscarawas County, Ohio
- Perry Township, Wood County, Ohio

=== Pennsylvania ===
- Perry Township, Armstrong County, Pennsylvania
- Perry Township, Berks County, Pennsylvania
- Perry Township, Clarion County, Pennsylvania
- Perry Township, Fayette County, Pennsylvania
- Perry Township, Greene County, Pennsylvania
- Perry Township, Jefferson County, Pennsylvania
- Perry Township, Lawrence County, Pennsylvania
- Perry Township, Mercer County, Pennsylvania
- Perry Township, Snyder County, Pennsylvania

=== South Dakota ===
- Perry Township, Davison County, South Dakota, in Davison County, South Dakota
- Perry Township, Lincoln County, South Dakota, in Lincoln County, South Dakota
