= Jackson County, Iowa =

County in Iowa, United States

- County
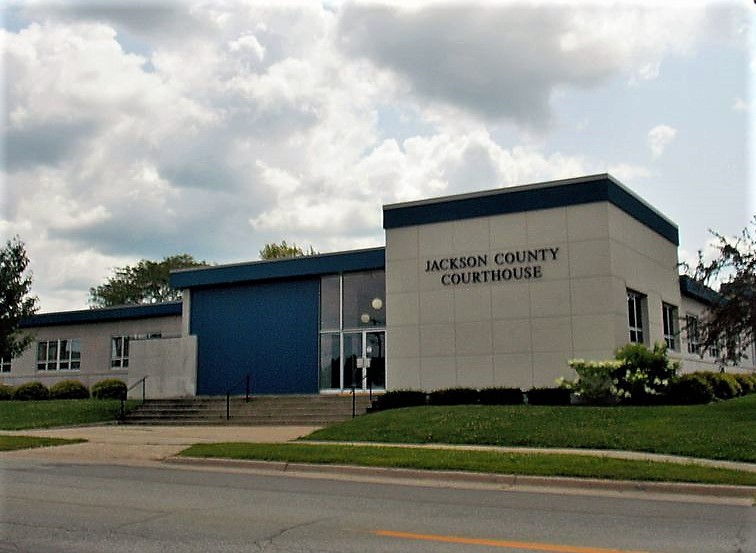
- The Jackson County Courthouse in Maquoketa

- Location within the U.S. state of Iowa
- Coordinates: 42°10′13″N 90°34′30″W
- Country: United States
- State: Iowa
- Founded: December 21, 1837
- Named for: Andrew Jackson
- Seat: Maquoketa
- Largest city: Maquoketa

Area
  - Total: 650 sq mi (1,700 km^{2})
  - Land: 584 sq mi (1,510 km^{2})
  - Water: 69 sq mi (180 km^{2}) 10.63%

Population (2020)
  - Total: 19,485
  - Estimate (2025): 19,288 ▼
  - Density: 33.4/sq mi (12.9/km^{2})
- Time zone: UTC−6 (Central)
  - Summer (DST): UTC−5 (CDT)
- Congressional district: 1st
- Website: jacksoncounty.iowa.gov
- Iowa county number 49

Jackson County is a county located in the U.S. state of Iowa. As of the 2020 census, the population was 19,485. The county seat is Maquoketa.

== History ==
Part of Jackson County, that north of the Tete Des Morts Creek, was in the land grant given to Julien Dubuque by the Spanish Empire. Later, the land would be involved with the Black Hawk Purchase. The generally accepted first permanent European settlement in the county was created by James Armstrong near Bellevue.

The county was formed on December 21, 1837, from Dubuque County and named after US President Andrew Jackson by the Wisconsin Territory's legislature. Upon formation, the county held lands to the west that would become Jones and Linn Counties. The first meeting of the county's commissioners was held in Bellevue in April 1838. The county was originally split into six precincts before being split into nine townships in 1840. More townships were made in following years. In 1841, the seat of Jackson County was moved from Bellevue to Andrew. Between 1847 and 1848, a jail was constructed in Andrew.

In the early morning of July 22, 2022, an assailant killed three members of a family at the campground of Maquoketa Caves State Park, located in the county. The assailant, identified as 23-year-old Anthony Sherwin of Nebraska, later committed suicide.

== Geography ==
According to the U.S. Census Bureau, the county has a total area of 650 square miles (1,700 km^{2}), of which 636 square miles (1,650 km^{2}) is land and 14 square miles (36 km^{2}) (2.1%) is water. Its eastern border is formed by the Mississippi River.

=== Major highways ===
- U.S. Highway 52
- U.S. Highway 61
- U.S. Highway 67
- Iowa Highway 62
- Iowa Highway 64

=== Adjacent counties ===
- Dubuque County (north)
- Jo Daviess County, Illinois (northeast)
- Carroll County, Illinois (east)
- Clinton County (south)
- Jones County (west)

=== National protected areas ===
- Driftless Area National Wildlife Refuge (part)
- Upper Mississippi River National Wildlife and Fish Refuge (part)

=== State protected areas ===
- Maquoketa Caves State Park
- Bellevue State Park

== Demographics ==
Historical population
Census	Pop.	Note	%±
1840	1,411		—
1850	7,210		411.0%
1860	18,493		156.5%
1870	22,619		22.3%
1880	23,771		5.1%
1890	22,771		−4.2%
1900	23,615		3.7%
1910	21,258		−10.0%
1920	19,931		−6.2%
1930	18,481		−7.3%
1940	19,181		3.8%
1950	18,622		−2.9%
1960	20,754		11.4%
1970	20,839		0.4%
1980	22,503		8.0%
1990	19,950		−11.3%
2000	20,296		1.7%
2010	19,848		−2.2%
2020	19,485		−1.8%
2025 (est.)	19,288	▼	−1.0%
U.S. Decennial Census; 1790–1960 1900–1990; 1990–2000 2010–2020

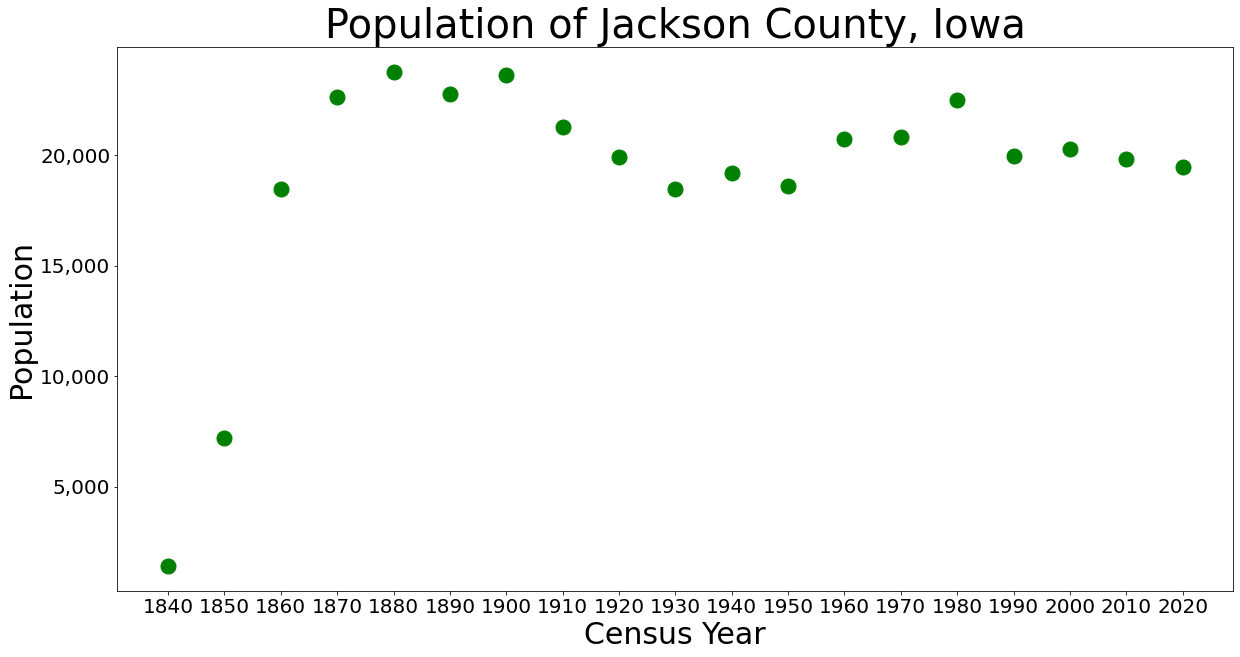
Population of Jackson County from the U.S. census data

=== 2020 census ===
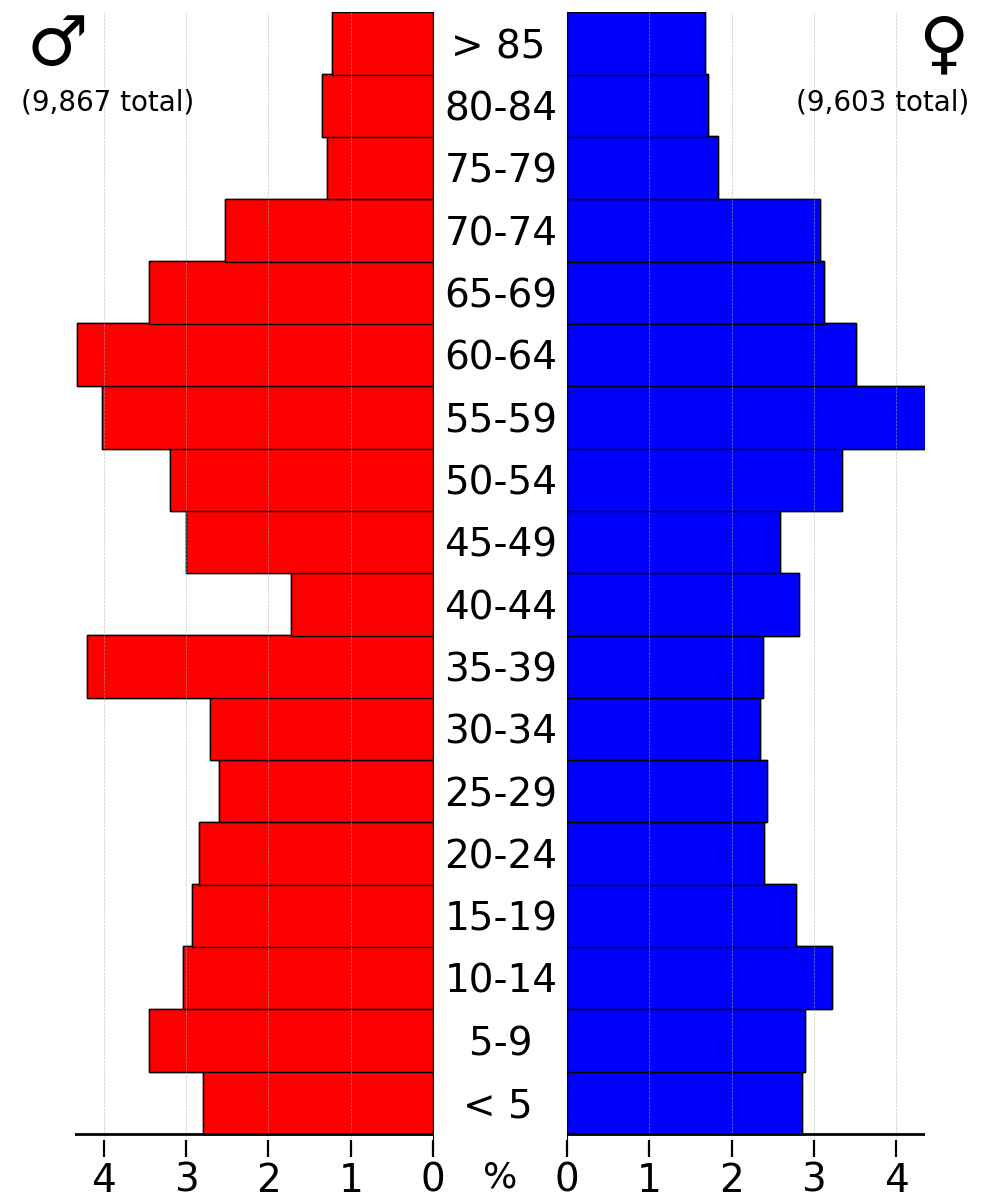
2022 US Census population pyramid for Jackson County from ACS 5-year estimates

As of the 2020 census, the county had a population of 19,485 and a population density of 29.7/sq mi (11.5/km^{2}).

97.42% of the population reported being of one race. The racial makeup of the county was 94.7% White, 0.8% Black or African American, 0.2% American Indian and Alaska Native, 0.2% Asian, 1.0% Native Hawaiian and Pacific Islander, 0.5% from some other race, and 2.6% from two or more races. Hispanic or Latino residents of any race comprised 1.2% of the population.

The median age was 45.2 years. 21.7% of residents were under the age of 18 and 22.0% were 65 years of age or older. For every 100 females there were 100.2 males, and for every 100 females age 18 and over there were 98.8 males age 18 and over.

31.3% of residents lived in urban areas, while 68.7% lived in rural areas.

There were 8,305 households in the county, of which 25.6% had children under the age of 18 living in them. Of all households, 52.5% were married-couple households, 18.7% were households with a male householder and no spouse or partner present, and 22.0% were households with a female householder and no spouse or partner present. About 29.8% of all households were made up of individuals and 14.4% had someone living alone who was 65 years of age or older.

There were 9,241 housing units, of which 8,305 were occupied and 10.1% were vacant; among occupied units, 76.3% were owner-occupied and 23.7% were renter-occupied. The homeowner vacancy rate was 1.0% and the rental vacancy rate was 7.0%.

=== 2010 census ===
The 2010 census recorded a population of 19,848 in the county, with a population density of 31.2/sq mi (12.0/km^{2}). There were 9,415 housing units, of which 8,289 were occupied.

=== 2000 census ===
As of the census of 2000, there were 20,296 people, 8,078 households, and 5,589 families residing in the county. The population density was 32 people per square mile (12 people/km^{2}). There were 8,949 housing units at an average density of 14 units per square mile (5.4 units/km^{2}). The racial makeup of the county was 98.96% White, 0.10% Black or African American, 0.12% Native American, 0.09% Asian, 0.11% Pacific Islander, 0.15% from other races, and 0.47% from two or more races. 0.60% of the population were Hispanic or Latino of any race.

There were 8,078 households, out of which 32.00% had children under the age of 18 living with them, 58.20% were married couples living together, 7.70% had a female householder with no husband present, and 30.80% were non-families. 27.00% of all households were made up of individuals, and 13.80% had someone living alone who was 65 years of age or older. The average household size was 2.47 and the average family size was 3.01.

In the county, the population was spread out, with 26.00% under the age of 18, 7.00% from 18 to 24, 26.50% from 25 to 44, 23.20% from 45 to 64, and 17.30% who were 65 years of age or older. The median age was 39 years. For every 100 females there were 97.10 males. For every 100 females age 18 and over, there were 93.90 males.

The median income for a household in the county was $34,529, and the median income for a family was $42,526. Males had a median income of $29,334 versus $20,577 for females. The per capita income for the county was $17,329. About 7.70% of families and 10.30% of the population were below the poverty line, including 13.90% of those under age 18 and 8.90% of those age 65 or over.

== Government ==
As of 2018 the three-member Jackson County Board of Supervisors is Larry McDevitt, Mike Steines, and Jack Willey. Their Executive Assistant is LuAnn Goeke.

=== Sheriff's office ===
The Jackson County Sheriff's Office is the primary law enforcement agency located in the county. The headquarters for the Sheriff's Department are in Maquoketa, Iowa. The department is led by an elected Sheriff. The current Sheriff is Brent Kilburg.

=== Fire Protection and Emergency Medical Services ===
Fire protection in the county is left up to the discretion of the cities within the county. The towns of Maquoketa, Preston, Miles, Springbrook, Sabula, Baldwin, Bellevue, Andrew and La Motte all have their own fire departments providing protection for the whole county. Most city fire departments also provide rescue services. Fire equipment usually consists of Engines, Tankers and brush trucks as well as most fire departments owning a Rescue truck. The Maquoketa Fire department also owns a Ladder truck. Most firefighters certify as Iowa Firefighter One and HAZMAT Operations and some also are certified as EMTs. The towns of Maquoketa, Preston, Sabula and Bellevue also have their own Ambulance Services which provide coverage for the county while towns not having ambulances have First Responder units and contract ambulance response to a nearby community. All firefighters in Jackson County are volunteers and most EMS personnel are also volunteers however the Maquoketa Ambulance Service is a paid service. All Jackson County departments are members of the Jackson County Firefighters Association and the Iowa Firefighters Association. Mutual Aid Agreements from surrounding Iowa counties as well as the state of Illinois are in place to provide additional help during emergencies which tax the county emergency resources beyond their limits.

=== Townships ===
Jackson County is divided into 18 townships, administrative subdivisions of the county:

- Bellevue
- Brandon
- Butler
- Fairfield
- Farmers Creek
- Iowa
- Jackson
- Maquoketa
- Monmouth
- Otter Creek
- Perry
- Prairie Springs
- Richland
- South Fork
- Tete Des Morts
- Union
- Van Buren
- Washington

=== Hospital ===
Jackson County has one Hospital in Maquoketa, the Jackson County Regional Health Center. As of 2016 the hospital is under the administration of Genesis Healthcare. Patients near Maquoketa are transported to this hospital, while patients closer to Clinton County will most likely be taken to Mercy Medical Center in Clinton, Iowa. Some patients closer to Dubuque County are taken to Mercy or Finley Hospitals, both in the city of Dubuque.

=== Election results ===
Prior to 1988, Jackson County was a Republican-leaning swing county, only failing to back the national winner six times between 1880 & 1984. The county was reliably Democratic from 1988 to 2012, but swung by 18% to back Donald Trump in 2016. In 2020 Donald Trump carried Jackson County with 62% of the vote over Joseph Biden's 36%.

United States presidential election results for Jackson County, Iowa
Year	Republican		Democratic		Third party(ies)	
Year	No.	%	No.	%	No.	%
1896	3,713	52.49%	3,279	46.35%	82	1.16%
1900	2,964	50.66%	2,854	48.78%	33	0.56%
1904	2,899	52.33%	2,483	44.82%	158	2.85%
1908	2,542	48.51%	2,545	48.57%	153	2.92%
1912	1,174	24.46%	2,259	47.06%	1,367	28.48%
1916	2,533	52.63%	2,186	45.42%	94	1.95%
1920	4,763	67.99%	1,954	27.89%	288	4.11%
1924	4,218	50.20%	2,352	27.99%	1,833	21.81%
1928	4,740	55.73%	3,729	43.84%	37	0.43%
1932	2,892	34.03%	5,094	59.94%	513	6.04%
1936	3,581	40.59%	4,889	55.41%	353	4.00%
1940	5,417	56.07%	4,218	43.66%	26	0.27%
1944	4,341	55.05%	3,537	44.85%	8	0.10%
1948	3,597	51.35%	3,263	46.58%	145	2.07%
1952	5,867	64.28%	3,074	33.68%	186	2.04%
1956	5,575	62.61%	3,181	35.72%	149	1.67%
1960	5,084	53.89%	4,345	46.06%	5	0.05%
1964	3,066	37.37%	5,130	62.52%	9	0.11%
1968	4,535	53.02%	3,413	39.90%	605	7.07%
1972	4,975	55.75%	3,704	41.51%	245	2.75%
1976	4,221	47.50%	4,467	50.27%	198	2.23%
1980	4,479	51.17%	3,518	40.19%	757	8.65%
1984	4,811	51.51%	4,400	47.11%	129	1.38%
1988	3,237	39.32%	4,864	59.08%	132	1.60%
1992	2,673	28.73%	4,421	47.51%	2,211	23.76%
1996	2,827	33.41%	4,609	54.47%	1,025	12.11%
2000	3,769	41.73%	4,945	54.75%	318	3.52%
2004	4,242	42.37%	5,656	56.50%	113	1.13%
2008	3,673	36.89%	6,102	61.28%	182	1.83%
2012	4,177	40.78%	5,907	57.67%	158	1.54%
2016	5,824	56.49%	3,837	37.22%	649	6.29%
2020	6,940	62.33%	4,029	36.18%	166	1.49%
2024	7,074	65.49%	3,567	33.02%	160	1.48%

== Communities ==
=== Incorporated communities ===
List of Cities in Jackson County ranked by population Recorded by the United States Census Bureau† 'county seat'
Rank	City	2020 City Population	2010 City Population	Change
1	Maquoketa †	6,128	6,141	−0.21%
2	Bellevue	2,363	2,191	+7.85%
3	Preston	949	1,012	−6.23%
4	Sabula	506	576	−12.15%
5	Miles	408	445	−8.31%
6	Andrew	380	434	−12.44%
7	La Motte	237	260	−8.85%
8	Monmouth	129	153	−15.69%
9	Springbrook	143	144	−0.69%
10	St. Donatus	120	135	−11.11%
11	Baldwin	99	109	−9.17%
12	Zwingle (partially in Dubuque County)	84	91	−7.69%
13	Spragueville	92	81	+13.58%

=== Unincorporated communities ===
- Canton‡
- Cottonville
- Emeline
- Garryowen
- Green Island
- Nashville
- Otter Creek
- South Garry Owen

=== Former communities ===
- Alma
- Amoy
- America
- Bridgeport
- Brookfield
- Buckhorn
- Canton
- Carrollport
- Centerville
- Charleston
- Charkstown
- Cobb
- Coloma
- Copper Creek
- Cottonville
- Crabb
- Crabb's Mill
- Crabbtown
- Deventersville
- Duggan
- Duke
- Fremont
- Fulton
- Gordon's Ferry
- Hickory Grove
- Higginsport
- Hugo
- Hurstville
- Fairfield
- Farmers Creek
- Franklin
- Iron Hill
- East Iron Hills
- Isabel
- Lowell
- Millrock
- Mount Algor
- Nashville
- New Castle
- New Rochester
- North Maquoketa
- Otter Creek
- Ozark
- Pass
- Prairie Springs
- Rolley
- Silsbee
- Smiths Ferry
- Springfield
- Spruce Mills
- Sterling
- Sullivan
- Summer Hill
- Sylva
- Tetes des Morts
- Union Center
- Van Buren
- Wagonersburgh
- Waterford
- Wickliffe

== See also ==
- National Register of Historic Places listings in Jackson County, Iowa

== Bibliography ==
- Sorensen, Lucille. Holihan, Grace. Ghost Towns of Jackson County Iowa/History of Jackson County, Vol. 1, Jackson County Historical Society 1988 and 2000.
