= George Dyas House =

Historic house in Iowa, United States

- U.S. National Register of Historic Places
- Location within Iowa Location within the United States
- Location: County Road Z-15 southwest of its junction with U.S. Route 52
- Nearest city: Bellevue, Iowa
- Coordinates: 42°14′30″N 90°25′20″W
- Area: less than one acre
- Built: 1850
- Architectural style: Gothic Revival
- MPS: Limestone Architecture of Jackson County MPS
- NRHP reference No.: 91001077
- Added to NRHP: August 30, 1991

The George Dyas House is a historic house located south of Bellevue, Iowa. It is one of over 217 limestone structures in Jackson County from the mid-19th century, of which 101 are houses.

== Description ==
The George Dyas House is one of three houses in the Bellevue area that feature elements of the Gothic Revival style; Spring Side and the House at 505 Court Street being the other two. The 2½-story house features coursed cut stone block with dressed stone lintels, a three-bay façade on the eave side, and a projecting front gable. Another element that differentiates it from the other stone houses in the county are the long windows in the formal rooms. It appears like it may have originally had a wraparound porch on the south and east sides of the structure, however there are no records showing the existence of a porch.

The house was listed on the National Register of Historic Places in 1991.

== History ==
The Dyas family was allowed to settle in this area before it was officially opened for settlement. A log cabin was built on the claim. Other family members followed in 1833, and the siblings built houses within a mile or so of the original cabin.
