= Jackson County Courthouse =

Jackson County Courthouse may refer to:

- Jackson County Courthouse (Arkansas), Newport, Arkansas
- Jackson County Courthouse (Georgia), Jefferson, Georgia
- Jackson County Courthouse (Florida), Marianna, Florida
- Jackson County Courthouse (Illinois), Murphysboro, Illinois
- Jackson County Courthouse (Indiana), Brownstown, Indiana
- Jackson County Courthouse (Bellevue, Iowa)
- Jackson County Courthouse (Maquoketa, Iowa)
- Jackson County Courthouse (Kansas), Holton, Kansas
- Jackson County Courthouse (Minnesota), Jackson, Minnesota
- Jackson County Courthouse (Independence, Missouri)
- Jackson County Courthouse (Kansas City, Missouri)
- Jackson County Courthouse (North Carolina), Sylva, North Carolina
- Jackson County Courthouse (Oklahoma), Altus, Oklahoma
- Jackson County Courthouse (Jacksonville, Oregon)
- Jackson County Courthouse (Medford, Oregon)
- Jackson County Courthouse (Texas), Edna, Texas, site of the Jackson County Monument
