= Thomas Slye House =

Historic house in Iowa, United States

- U.S. National Register of Historic Places
- Location within Iowa Location within the United States
- Location: Southern side of 184th St. east of its junction with Iowa Highway 62
- Nearest city: Andrew, Iowa
- Coordinates: 42°11′29″N 90°36′15″W
- Area: less than one acre
- Built: 1860
- Architectural style: Vernacular
- MPS: Limestone Architecture of Jackson County MPS
- NRHP reference No.: 92000911
- Added to NRHP: July 24, 1992

The Thomas Slye House is a historic residence located north of Andrew, Iowa, United States. It is one of over 217 limestone structures in Jackson County from the mid-19th century, of which 101 are houses. The Slye house features a five bay symmetrical facade capped by a gable roof. Slye, a native of England, quarried the stones for the house himself and had a stonemason construct the house. The stones are of various sizes and shapes and laid in courses. The double end chimneys are found on only two other stone houses in the county, and the Slye and DeFries houses have them constructed in brick. Also similar to the DeFries House is the use of jack arches instead on lintels above the windows and doors. It is possible that both houses were constructed by the same stonemason. A single-story frame addition with an attached two-car garage was built onto the back of the houses at a later date. The house was listed on the National Register of Historic Places in 1992.
