= Bellevue State Park (Iowa) =

State park in Jackson County, Iowa

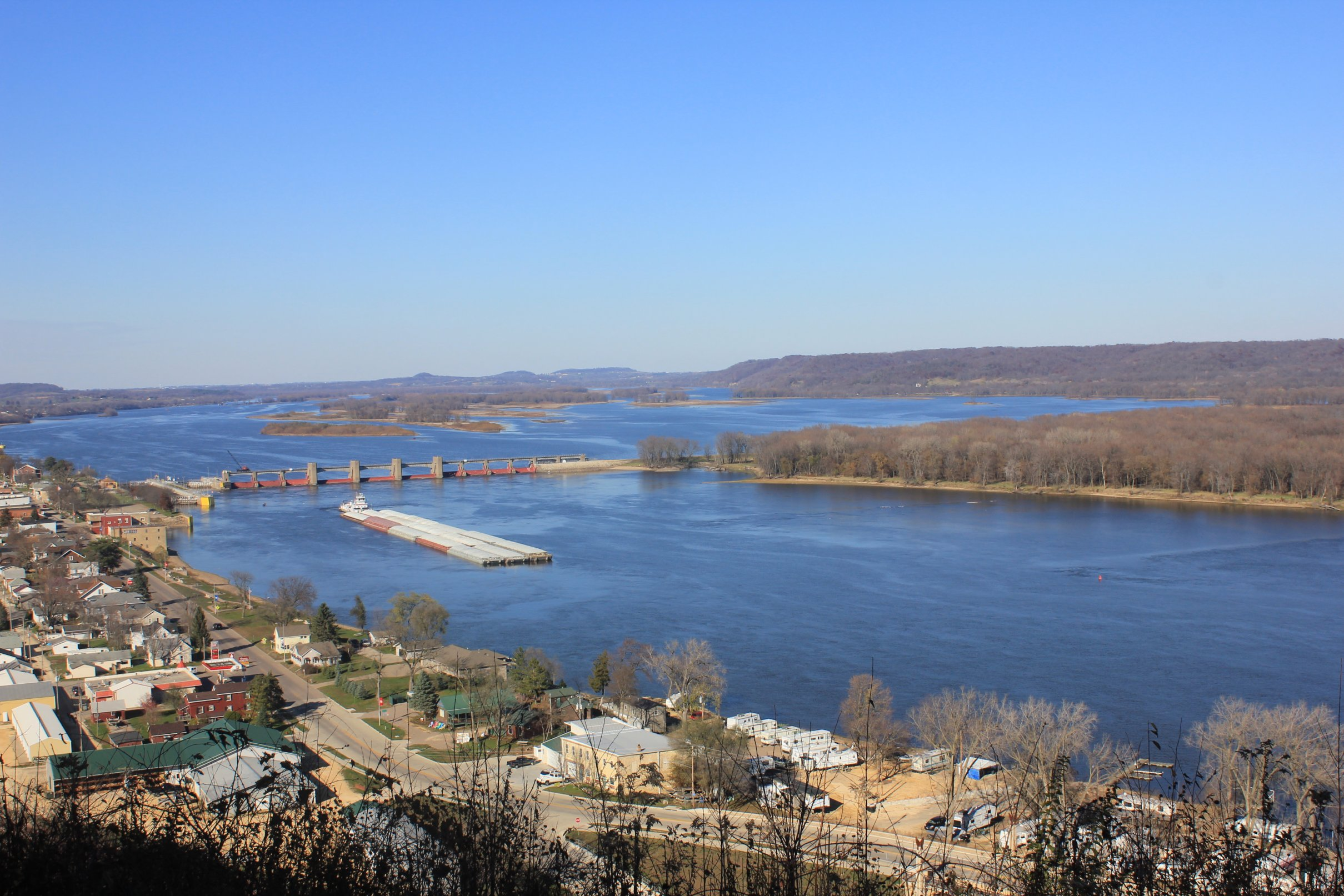
- View from the park of Bellevue and Mississippi River

- Location within Iowa Location within the United States
- Interactive map of Bellevue State Park
- Location: Jackson County, Iowa, United States
- Coordinates: 42°14′50″N 90°25′22″W
- Area: 788 acres (319 ha)
- Elevation: 807 ft (246 m)
- Established: 1928
- Administrator: Iowa Department of Natural Resources
- Website: Official website

Bellevue State Park is a public recreation area along the banks of the Mississippi River just south of Bellevue, Iowa, United States. The state park lies in two separate tracts. The Nelson Unit is at the immediate south edge of Bellevue on U.S. Route 52, atop a 300-foot (91 m) limestone bluff. The Dyas Unit is 2 miles (3.2 km) farther south on U.S. 52. The park offers high bluffs with scenic views of the Mississippi River amidst 788 acres (3.19 km^{2}) of timbered walking trails, a butterfly sanctuary and an enclosed nature center.

== Picnicking/shelters ==
Picnickers at the Nelson Unit can enjoy views of the Mississippi River. Open picnic shelters may be reserved for a fee. The lodge is available on a reservation basis for wedding receptions and other family events. The lodge and open shelters may be reserved online through the park reservation system.

== Camping ==
The Dyas Unit has 46 camping units (31 with electrical hookups), modern rest rooms, showers and a sanitary dumping station. Advance campsite reservations can be booked through the park reservation system. Half of the campsites are available for self-registration on a first-come, first-served basis. Camping is not allowed in the Nelson Unit.

== Trails ==
The Nelson Unit has four trails that provide a variety of hiking opportunities. One trail leads to a scenic overlook of the Mississippi, one winds past Indian burial mounds, one passes through a restored prairie and a "Garden Sanctuary for Butterflies", and leads past an old limestone rock quarry.

The Dyas Unit comprises about 4 miles (6.4 km) of foot trails, scenic overlooks, a stream with beaver dams, and aquatic and other wildlife. In winter bald eagles concentrate to feed near the open waters below Lock and Dam No. 12. Pileated woodpeckers are occasionally seen in isolated areas.

== South Bluff Nature Center ==
The South Bluff Nature Center in the Nelson Unit contains displays on the plants, animals and geology of Bellevue State Park. The center is open seasonally and offers a variety of programs in the summer.

The "Garden Sanctuary for Butterflies" is located nearby. This area contains over one hundred separate plots, each featuring plants which provide food and habitat for butterflies. A network of pathways allows visitors to walk through the garden and see a wide variety of butterflies as well as enjoy the flowers and the pond in the center.
