= Nathaniel Butterworth House =

Historic house in Iowa, United States

- U.S. National Register of Historic Places
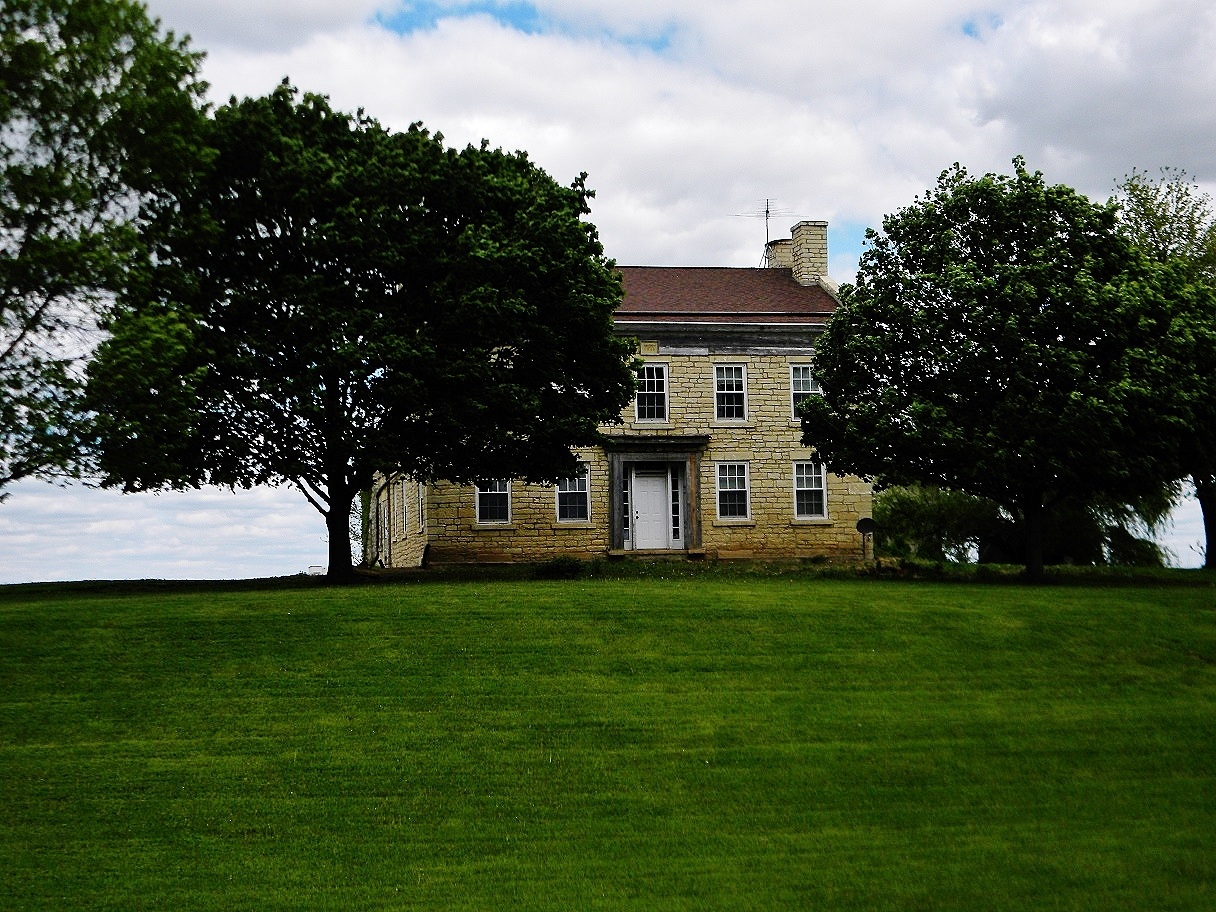

- Location within Iowa Location within the United States
- Location: Eastern side of Iowa Highway 62, north of Andrew
- Coordinates: 42°09′46″N 90°35′52″W
- Area: less than one acre
- Built: 1852
- Architectural style: Vernacular
- MPS: Limestone Architecture of Jackson County MPS
- NRHP reference No.: 92000909
- Added to NRHP: July 24, 1992

The Nathaniel Butterworth House is a historic residence located north of Andrew, Iowa, United States. It is one of over 217 limestone structures in Jackson County from the mid-19th century, of which 101 are houses. The Butterworth house features a five bay symmetrical facade capped by a gable roof. The stones, which were said to have been quarried on this farm, are of various sizes and shapes and are laid in courses. Unlike many of the stone houses in Jackson County, the Butterworth house makes use of Classical entablature and pilasters around the transom and the sidelights of the main entry. The double end chimneys are found on only two other stone houses in the county.

Nathaniel Butterworth was one of the first settlers in the Andrew area, arriving in 1838. He built a log house on this property in 1845. It was located on the territorial road between Dubuque and Davenport. Stage coaches would stop at the log house and at this stone house, which was built in 1852. Called the Butterworth Inn, it also served as a post office. Ansel Briggs, who would become Iowa's first governor, would stop here while working as a stagecoach driver. He also lived here from 1866 to 1871. After 1891 this stone structure has been used only as a private residence, and it has remained in the Butterworth family. The log house and a fame barn from the 1840s survived into the 1960s. The house was listed on the National Register of Historic Places in 1992 and currently is a private residence.
