= Jackson County Courthouse (Maquoketa, Iowa) =

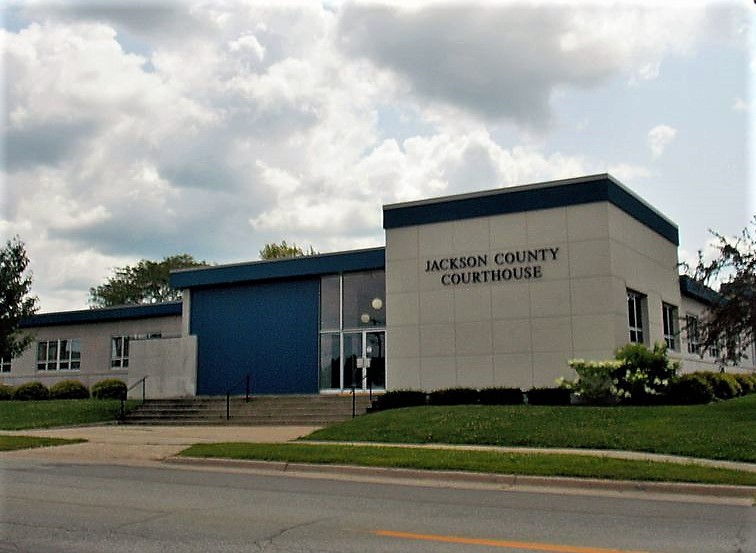
- Jackson County Courthouse
- Interactive map of the Jackson County Courthouse area

General information
- Type: Courthouse
- Architectural style: Modern
- Location: 201 W Platt St., Maquoketa, Iowa, United States
- Coordinates: 42.068825°N 90.667317°W
- Completed: 1958

Technical details
- Floor count: 1

Design and construction
- Architect: William J. McNeil
- Main contractor: Roth & Associates

The Jackson County Courthouse is located in Maquoketa, Iowa, United States. In the county's early years the county seat transferred several times between Bellevue and Andrew. In 1873 it moved to Maquoketa and the courthouse shared space with the new city hall that was built the same year. The county signed a 99-year lease, for $1, which committed the county to stay in Maquoketa. A separate building was built for a courthouse in 1886. It was a 2½-story brick structure in the Second Empire style. By 1938, it had become too small and some county offices began to occupy another building. The previous courthouse stood on the same location as the present courthouse, and was torn down before the current building was constructed.

The present courthouse was built in 1958 for about $400,000. The building was designed by William J. McNeil, and Roth & Associates were the general contractors. It is a simple single-story concrete structure. The solid glass main entrance is on the northwest corner in between a raised concrete wall and a solid blue wall. The L-shaped building has a flat roofline and a simple blue cornice that encircles the structure.

== See also ==
- Jackson County Courthouse (Bellevue, Iowa)
