= DeFries House, Barn and Carpenter Shop =

Historic house in Iowa, United States

- U.S. National Register of Historic Places
- Location within Iowa Location within the United States
- Location: Eastern side of 232nd Ave., 255 feet south-west of its junction with 180th St.
- Nearest city: Andrew, Iowa
- Coordinates: 42.18839°N 90.62162°W
- Area: less than one acre
- Built: 1858, 1862
- Built by: Christian Blessing
- Architectural style: Vernacular
- MPS: Limestone Architecture of Jackson County MPS
- NRHP reference No.: 92000910
- Added to NRHP: July 24, 1992

The DeFries House, Barn and Carpenter Shop are a collection of historic buildings located north-west of Andrew, Iowa, United States. They are three of over 217 limestone structures in Jackson County from the mid-19th century, of which 101 were houses, nine were barns, and 36 were other farm-related buildings. The stones used in the construction are of various sizes and shapes and laid in courses. The double end chimneys on the house are found on only two other stone houses in the county, and the DeFries and Thomas Slye houses have them constructed in brick. Also similar to the Slye house is the use of jack arches instead of lintels above the windows and doors. It is possible that both houses were constructed by the same stonemason. While the stonemason for the Syle house is unknown, John Christoph "Christian" Blessing, who was trained in his native Germany, built this collection of buildings for the DeFries family. He completed the house in 1858 and the horse barn in 1862. The carpenter shop was built in either 1858 or 1862.

Above the main entry into the house is a hausspruch, which (translated from German) reads:

The Best that we have
is God and his Blessings.
B.A. DeVries : T. Ippers : A.B. DeVries.
1858

The three people referred to are Andreas Betten DeVries (later changed to DeFries), his father, Bette Andreas DeVries, and his stepmother, Trintje Ippers. They immigrated from Germany in 1855 and settled here. The farm expanded under Andreas to include 365 acres (148 ha), as well as other farm buildings. The three stone buildings are the original part of the farmstead. The house is a two-story, gable-roof structure, measuring 28 by 38 feet (8.5 by 11.6 m). The stone barn is an 18-by-38-foot (5.5 by 11.6 m) structure capped with a gable roof. The carpenter shop is a 16-by-18-foot (4.9 by 5.5 m) structure built adjacent to the house; as such, it is not considered an outbuilding. The three buildings were listed together on the National Register of Historic Places in 1992.
