= Robert M. Losey =

American meteorologist and air force officer

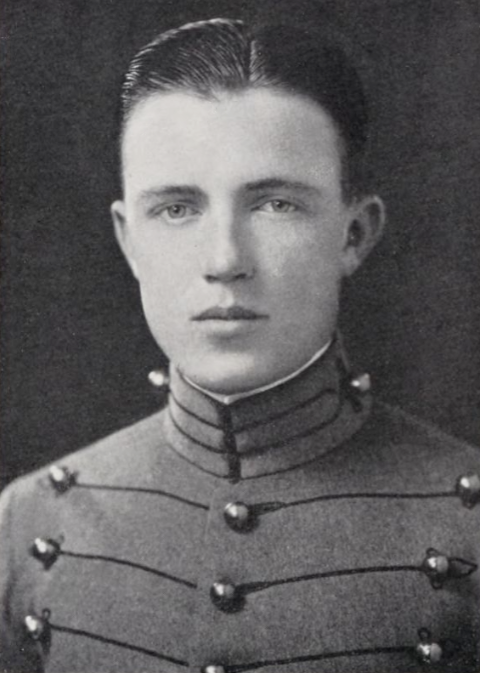
- As a West Point cadet
- Born: May 27, 1908; Andrew, Iowa, US
- Died: April 21, 1940 (aged 31); Dombås, Norway
- Burial place: West Point Cemetery
- Military career
- Allegiance: United States of America
- Branch: United States Army Air Corps
- Service years: 1929–1940
- Rank: Captain
- Conflicts: World War II: Norwegian campaign †

Captain Robert Moffat Losey (/ˈloʊsi/; May 27, 1908 – April 21, 1940), an aeronautical meteorologist, is considered to be the first American military casualty in World War II. While serving as a military attaché prior to America's entry into the war, Losey was killed on April 21, 1940, during a German bombardment in Norway. He had been attempting to complete the evacuation of the American diplomatic legation from Norway to Sweden in the wake of the German invasion.

== Personal background ==
Robert Mofat Losey was born in Andrew, Iowa, on May 27, 1908. to Presbyterian clergyman Leon A. Losey and his wife, Nellie Moore Losey. The family moved to Terry, Montana, where Pastor Losey served the First Presbyterian Church. When Robert was 15 years old, his father died from acute appendicitis on July 8, 1923, and was buried in the cemetery in Terry, Montana. Several months later, Robert and his mother Nellie relocated to New Jersey, her home state. He graduated from Trenton High School in Trenton, New Jersey, in 1924. He was appointed to the United States Military Academy in West Point, New York, in 1925. After graduating among the first 100 members of the West Point Class of 1929, he was commissioned as a second lieutenant in field artillery, but transferred one year later to the Air Corps. He received his wings from the Air Corps' Advanced Flying School in San Antonio, Texas, on October 11, 1930. Losey then earned two master's degrees from the California Institute of Technology, while serving as a meteorologist in California. "Professors described him as 'perhaps the most brilliant student' who ever attended the school."

On April 10, 1933, he was married to Kathryn Leona Gault "Kay" Banta of California.

== Washington D.C. ==
From August 1937 to January 1940, Losey was on duty in Washington with the office of Training and Operations Section of the office of the Chief of the Air Corps, Maj. Gen. Henry H. Arnold. There, he served as the first chief of the Weather Section and was considered "the army's crack aeronautical meteorological expert."

== Nordic countries ==
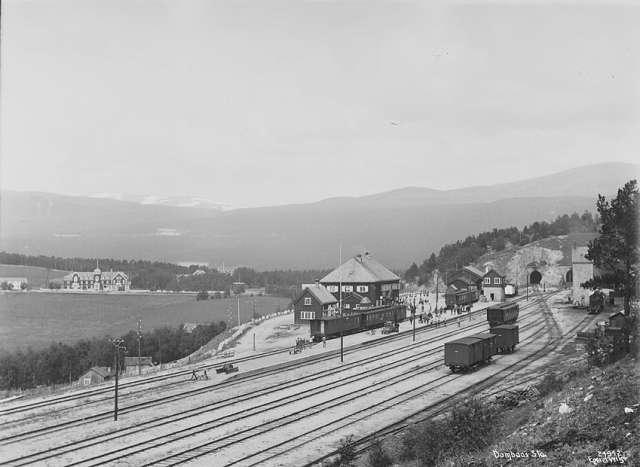
Dombås Station and the railway tunnels where the American party sought shelter

In February 1940 Losey began serving as the air assistant to the military attaché with the United States Embassy in Finland. News accounts indicated his mission was to report on air developments in the Russo-Finnish War (where the harsh winter conditions provided a special opportunity to observe the interplay between meteorology and military aeronautics). As the German armed forces began their Norwegian Campaign, Losey was directed first to Sweden, then to Norway. After arriving in Norway he immediately became involved in efforts to evacuate the American legation to safety across the Swedish border. The American legation was divided into two parties. The first party, including Losey and U.S. Minister Florence Jaffray Harriman, reached Sweden safely but had lost contact with the second party. Losey volunteered to return to Norway in search of the remainder of the American legation.

According to Harriman, Losey dissuaded her from accompanying him and Harriman's chauffeur on the rescue effort, and warned her that "you might be bombed," and "the Germans are strafing the roads." As Harriman later recounted in her book, Mission to the North, Losey told her that "I certainly don't want to be killed, but your death would be the more serious as it might involve our country in all kinds of trouble, whereas with a military attaché ... ." Harriman stayed in Sweden.

Seeking out the Americans, Losey and the chauffeur passed through Dombås, a strategic railway intersection, just as a German Luftwaffe bombing began. The two sought refuge in a railway tunnel with others, but once in the tunnel Losey stood where he could observe the bombing. After a bomb fell near the entrance to the tunnel, a fragment of it pierced Losey's heart, killing him. In addition to Losey, five Norwegians were killed by the bomb, and 18 wounded.

Several days later, Luftwaffe commander Hermann Göring sent to Major General Arnold a message of regret regarding Losey's death.

After the United States entered the war, Hollywood filmmaker Frank Capra included a brief account of Losey's death in Divide and Conquer, the third episode of his propaganda film series, Why We Fight, which he produced on behalf of the U.S. Army Signal Corps.

== Memorials ==
Losey's remains are buried next to those of his mother, in the West Point Cemetery.

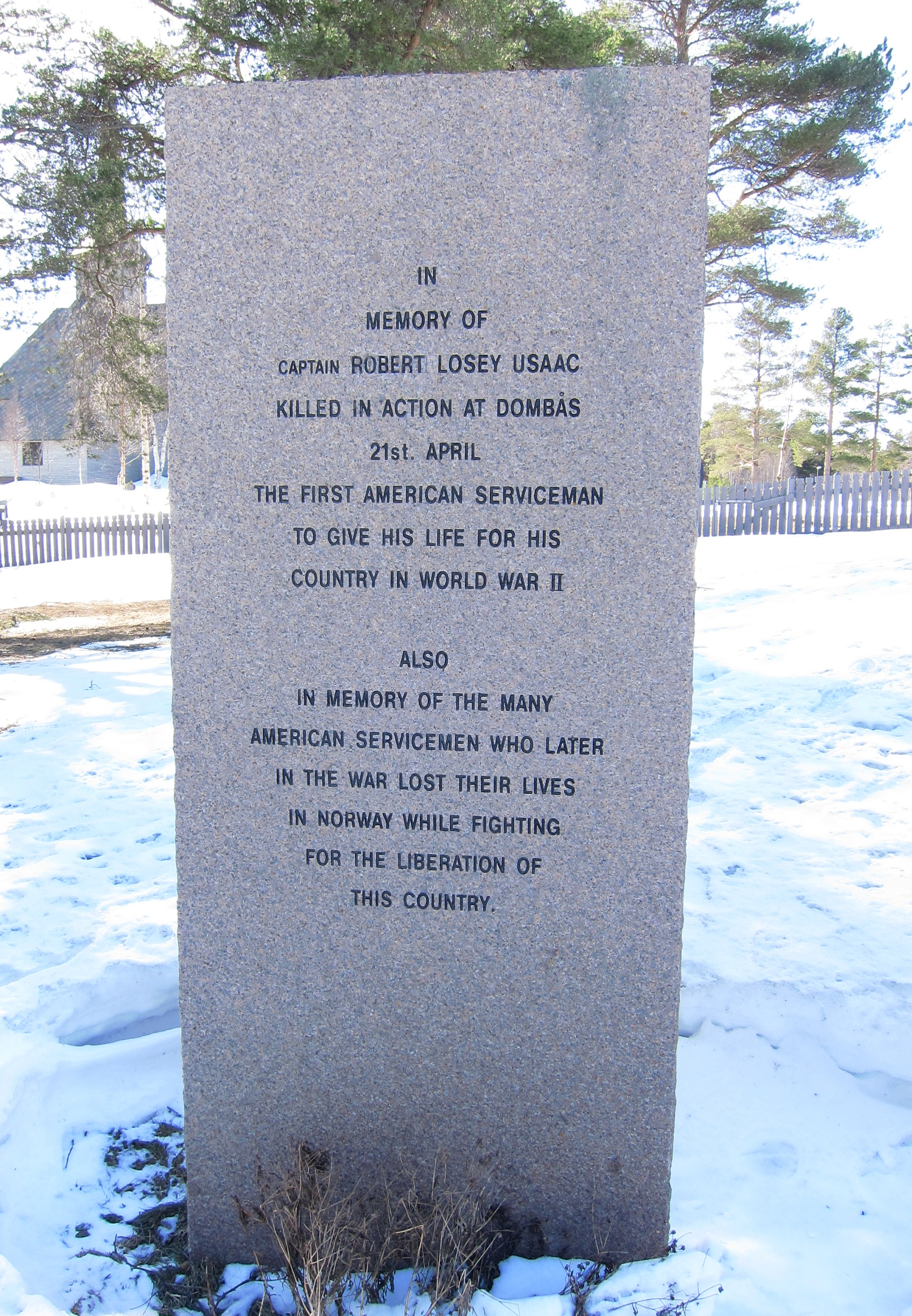
Losey memorial at Dombås

The citizens of Dombås erected a monument in Losey's honor in 1987, with the following inscription: "In memory of Captain Robert Losey, USAAC killed in action at Dombås 21st April. The first American serviceman to give his life for his country in World War II."

In 1940 the American Institute of Aeronautics and Astronautics established the Robert M. Losey Award in his memory. That honor, known since 1975 as the Losey Atmospheric Sciences Award, is presented in recognition of outstanding contributions to the atmospheric sciences as applied to the advancement of aeronautics and astronautics.

In 1941 the Army Air Corps established Losey Army Airfield east of Ponce, Puerto Rico, near the island's southern coast. Losey Field became known as Camp Losey when it was turned over to the Army's ground forces in 1944, and Fort Allen when it was turned over to the Army's Caribbean Signal Agency in 1959.

Losey Street on Scott AFB Illinois was named for Capt. Losey. The headquarters of USAF's Air Weather Service was once located on this street.

In 1980, the classmates of Losey from Trenton High School class of 1924 erected a plaque in his honor at the War Memorial in Trenton.

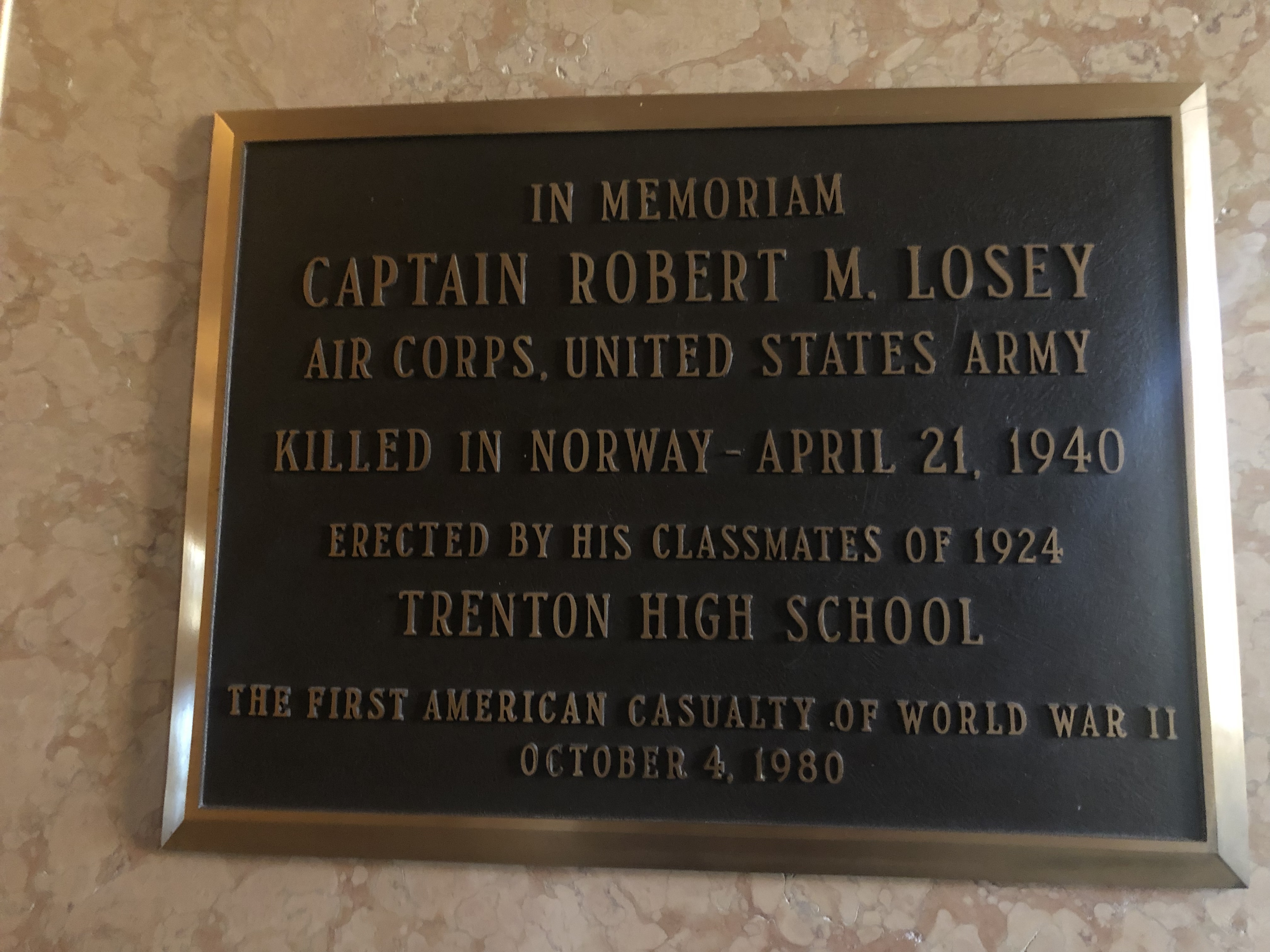
Plaque for Robert M Losey in the Trenton War Memorial
