= Iowa Highway 62 =

State highway in Iowa, United States

Iowa Highway 62
- Ansel Briggs Highway
- Iowa 62 highlighted in red

Route information
- Maintained by Iowa DOT
- Length: 19.633 mi (31.596 km)
- Existed: 1920–present

Major junctions
- West end: Iowa 64 in Maquoketa
- East end: US 52 / Great River Road in Bellevue

Location
- Country: United States
- State: Iowa
- Counties: Jackson

Highway system
- Iowa Primary Highway System; Interstate; US; State; Secondary; Scenic
← US 61	→ US 63

Iowa Highway 62 (Iowa 62) is a 19-mile-long (31 km) state highway in eastern Iowa. The highway begins in Maquoketa at Iowa 64, goes through Andrew, and ends in Bellevue at U.S. Highway 52 a few yards (meters) from the Mississippi River. The route has been on the primary highway system since the network was created in 1920. The road was graveled in the late 1920s and paved some 30 years later. It is called the Ansel Briggs Highway in honor of the first governor of Iowa who lived in Andrew during his term in office.

== Route description ==
Iowa 62 begins at a T intersection with Iowa 64 on the east side of Maquoketa. To the northeast of the junction lie the Jackson County Fairgrounds. The highway curves to the northeast and it crosses the Maquoketa River. Near Andrew it intersects Iron Bridge Road (County Road E23Y or CR E23Y) which leads to Spragueville. The highway briefly turns to the northwest and enters Andrew, home of Iowa's first governor, Ansel Briggs. From there, the roads winds to the northeast towards Bellevue. Just west of Bellevue, the highway enters the southern edge of the Driftless Area, a geologically distinct area of the upper Mississippi River valley characterized by high bluffs and deep valleys. Iowa 62 ends a few yards from the Mississippi River at an intersection with US 52 in downtown Bellevue.

== History ==
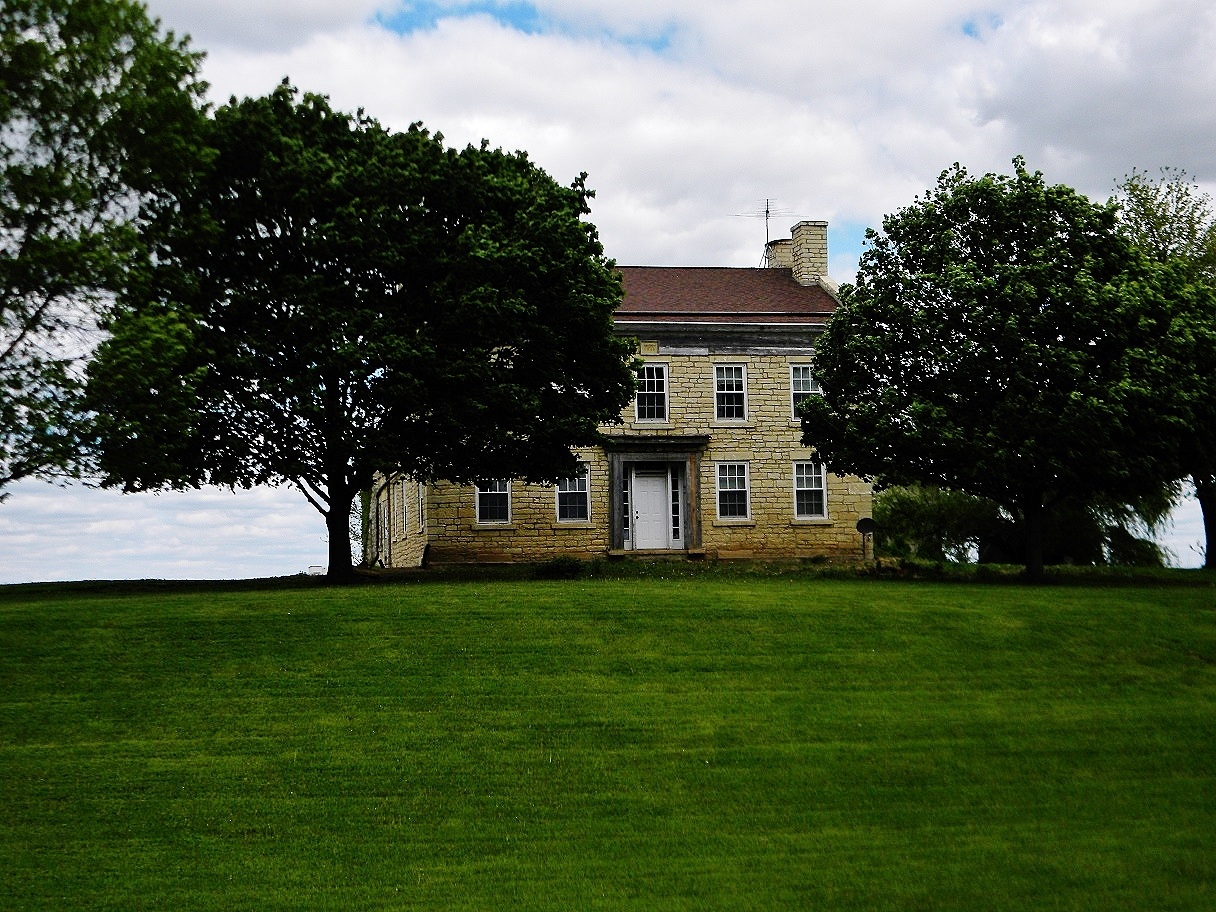
The Nathaniel Butterworth House is on Iowa 62 north of Andrew.

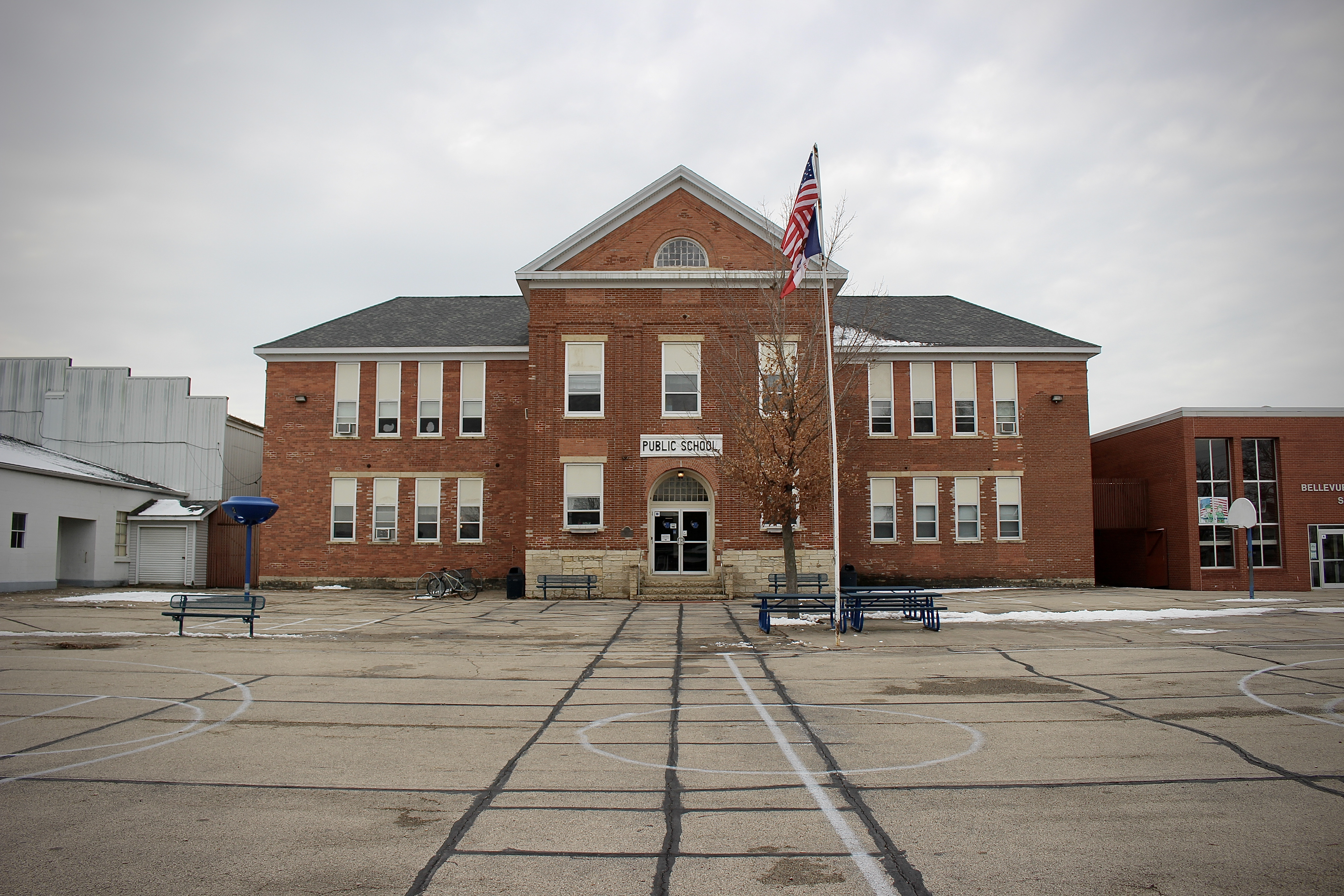
Former Jackson County Courthouse near the Iowa 62 eastern terminus in downtown Bellevue.

On the first map of primary roads published by the Iowa State Highway Commission, Primary Road No. 62 (No. 62) was shown connecting No. 20 at Fulton to Bellevue. Within a couple years, the road was rerouted from Fulton to begin in Maquoketa. Aside from straightening the route in a few locations, the routing remains the same today as it did in the 1920s. In September 1925, a memorial plaque was installed in Andrew next to a tree purportedly planted by Ansel Briggs, the first governor of Iowa, who lived in the town during his term in office. Governor John Hammill suggested to the Ansel Briggs Memorial Association that they establish a memorial highway to honor Briggs. Local business leaders supported the idea immediately and even suggested Briggs's memory would be best honored by a paved road. By the end of the year, the Jackson County Farm Bureau also supported the memorial highway.

In 1927, Jackson County voters approved a $1 million bond (equivalent to $14.1 million in 2023) for the improvement of highways in the county; Iowa 62 was expected to be upgraded to a gravel road. The bond vote was not without controversy. A state senator, who opposed the bond, was charged with assault after allegedly slapping the face of the editor of the Maquoketa Excelsior after the newspaper published an unflattering story about the senator's opposition. The highway was graveled within two years. In 1956, a 650-foot-long (200 m) steel and concrete bridge over the Maquoketa River replaced an adjacent 80-year-old span. Paving work between Maquoketa and Andrew began in May 1959. A contract for paving the final 10.4 miles (16.7 km) of road between Andrew and Bellevue was let in 1960; work continued through the next year. The 1962 Iowa highway map showed the highway as fully paved.

== Major intersections ==
The entire route is in Jackson County.

Location	mi	km	Destinations	Notes
Maquoketa	0.000	0.000	Iowa 64 / Grant Wood Scenic Byway – Maquoketa, Preston	
Andrew	6.763	10.884	CR E17 east / Grant Wood Scenic Byway – Springbrook	West end of CR E17 overlap
Andrew	7.041	11.331	CR E17 west / Grant Wood Scenic Byway	East end of CR E17 overlap
Bellevue	19.633	31.596	US 52 / Great River Road – Sabula, Dubuque	
1.000 mi = 1.609 km; 1.000 km = 0.621 mi: Concurrency terminus
