= Spring Side =

Historic house in Iowa, United States

- U.S. National Register of Historic Places
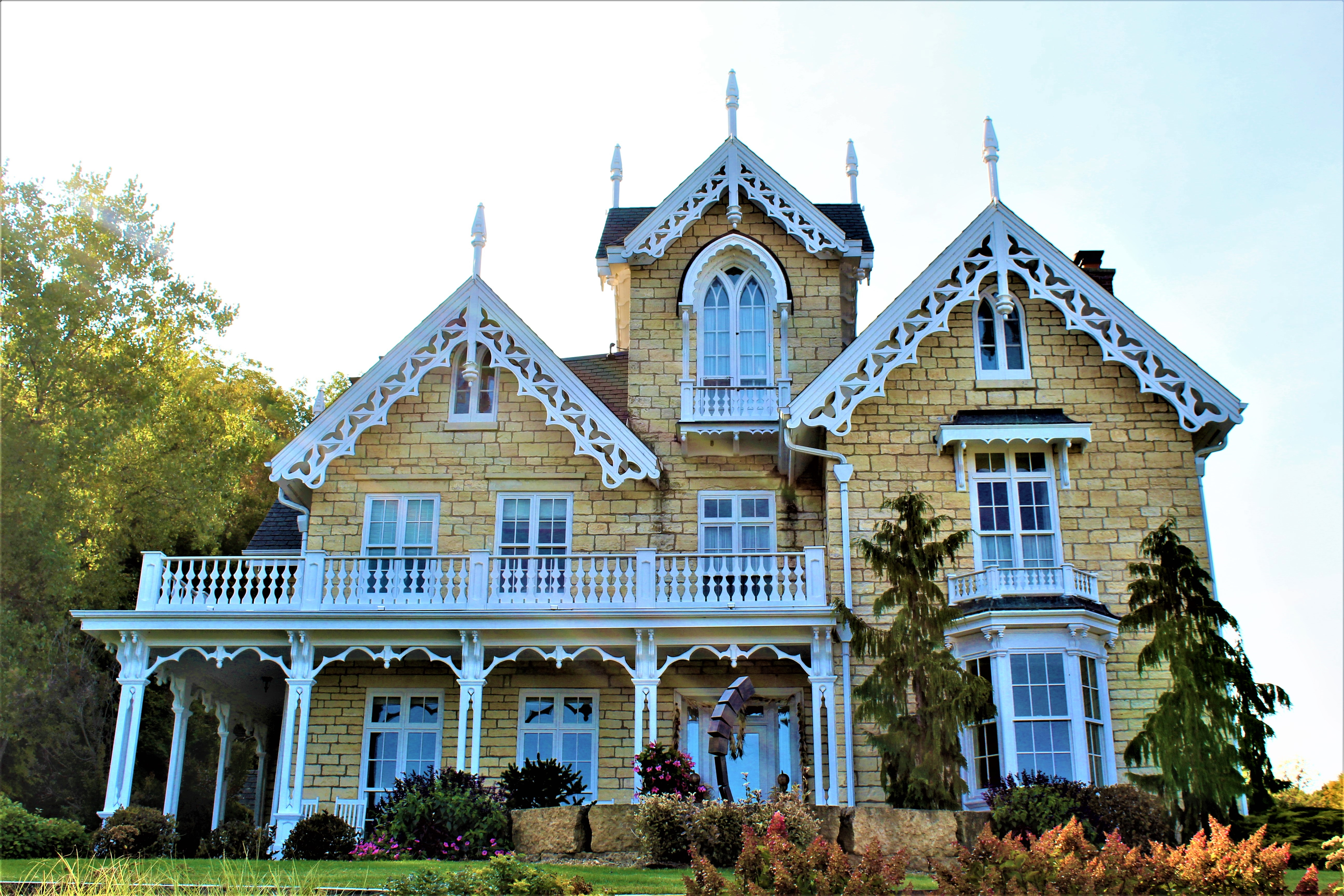

- Location within Iowa Location within the United States
- Location: Junction of U.S. Route 52 and Ensign Rd.
- Nearest city: Bellevue, Iowa
- Coordinates: 42°16′13″N 90°26′0″W
- Area: less than one acre
- Built: 1848
- Architectural style: Gothic Revival
- NRHP reference No.: 90001955
- Added to NRHP: December 28, 1990

Spring Side is a historic residence located just outside of Bellevue, Iowa, United States. The house was influenced by the Gothic Revival "cottage" popularized by A.J. Davis and A.J. Downing. It is sited on a hillside overlooking a valley and the Mississippi River. The property is the source for three springs, hence its name from 1867. Constructed in 1848 for William T. Wynkoop, a local businessman, the 2½-story stone building features steeply pitched gables trimmed with wooden scroll-work vergeboard and pendants with finials, and a gabled tower with the same decorative elements and lancet arch windows. Native limestone is its primary construction material. The house originally had a wraparound porch that was removed. It was listed on the National Register of Historic Places in 1990.
