= William Dyas Barn =

- U.S. National Register of Historic Places
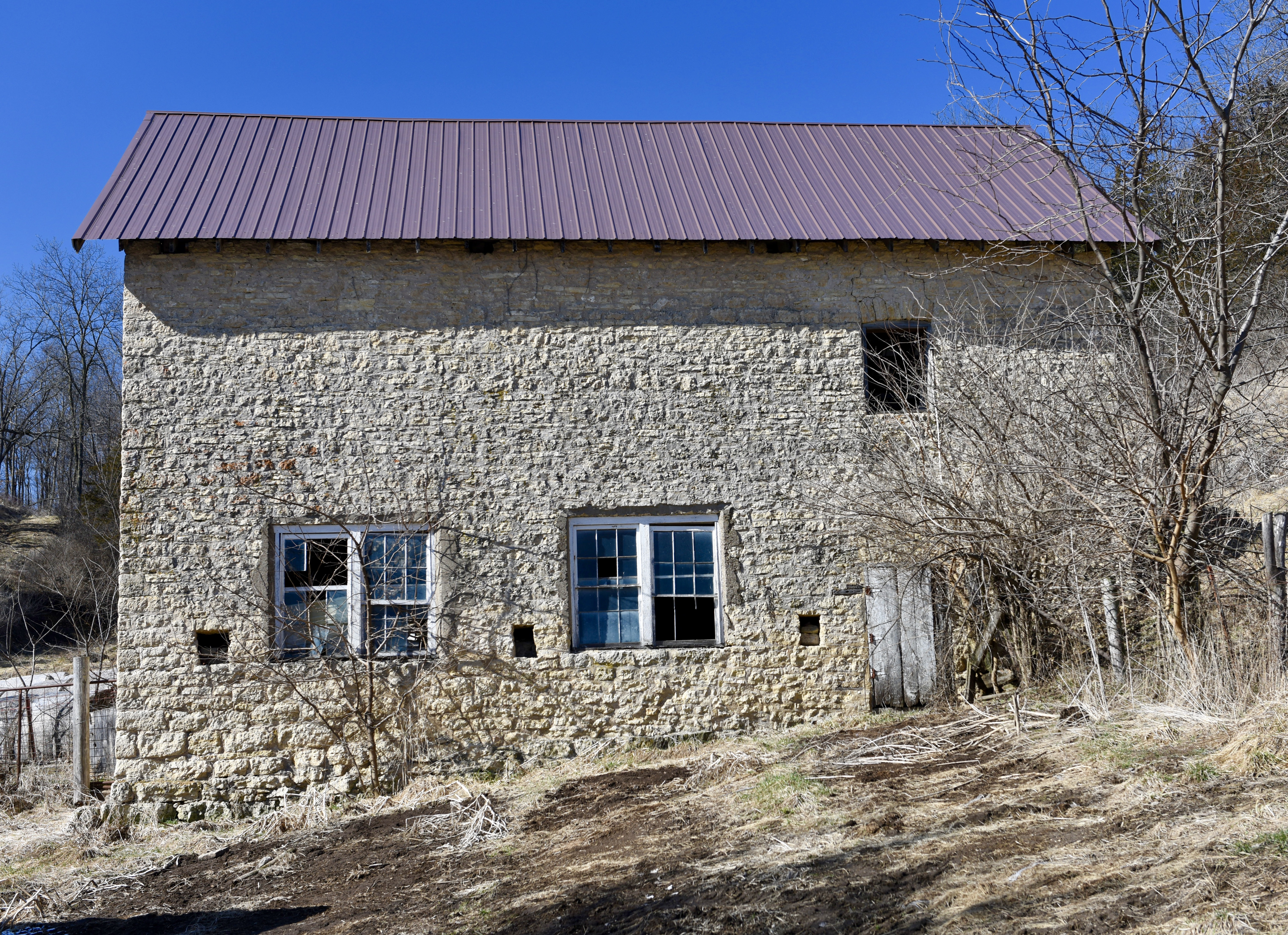

- Location within Iowa Location within the United States
- Location: County Road Z-15 southwest of its junction with U.S. Route 52
- Nearest city: Bellevue
- Coordinates: 42°14′39″N 90°25′11″W
- Area: less than one acre
- Built: 1850
- Architectural style: Vernacular
- MPS: Limestone Architecture of Jackson County MPS
- NRHP reference No.: 91001078
- Added to NRHP: August 30, 1991

The William Dyas Barn is a historic agricultural building located south of Bellevue, Iowa, United States. It is one of over 217 limestone structures in Jackson County from the mid-19th century, of which 58 are non-residential, agricultural related structures. The stones used to build the barn were quarried, but they vary widely in size and shape. The larger stones are at the bottom of the structure, and they diminish in size the higher up on the walls. An unusual feature on this barn is that the gable ends are not stone, but timber. The Dyas family were among the first settlers in Jackson County, arriving in 1833. They built five houses in this valley. William Dyas built a brick house along with this barn. It is believed there were many more stone barns in the county, but they have been removed over the years. That gives this barn the added significance of being an example of a vanishing building type. It was listed on the National Register of Historic Places in 1991.
