= House at 505 Court Street =

Historic house in Iowa, United States

- U.S. National Register of Historic Places
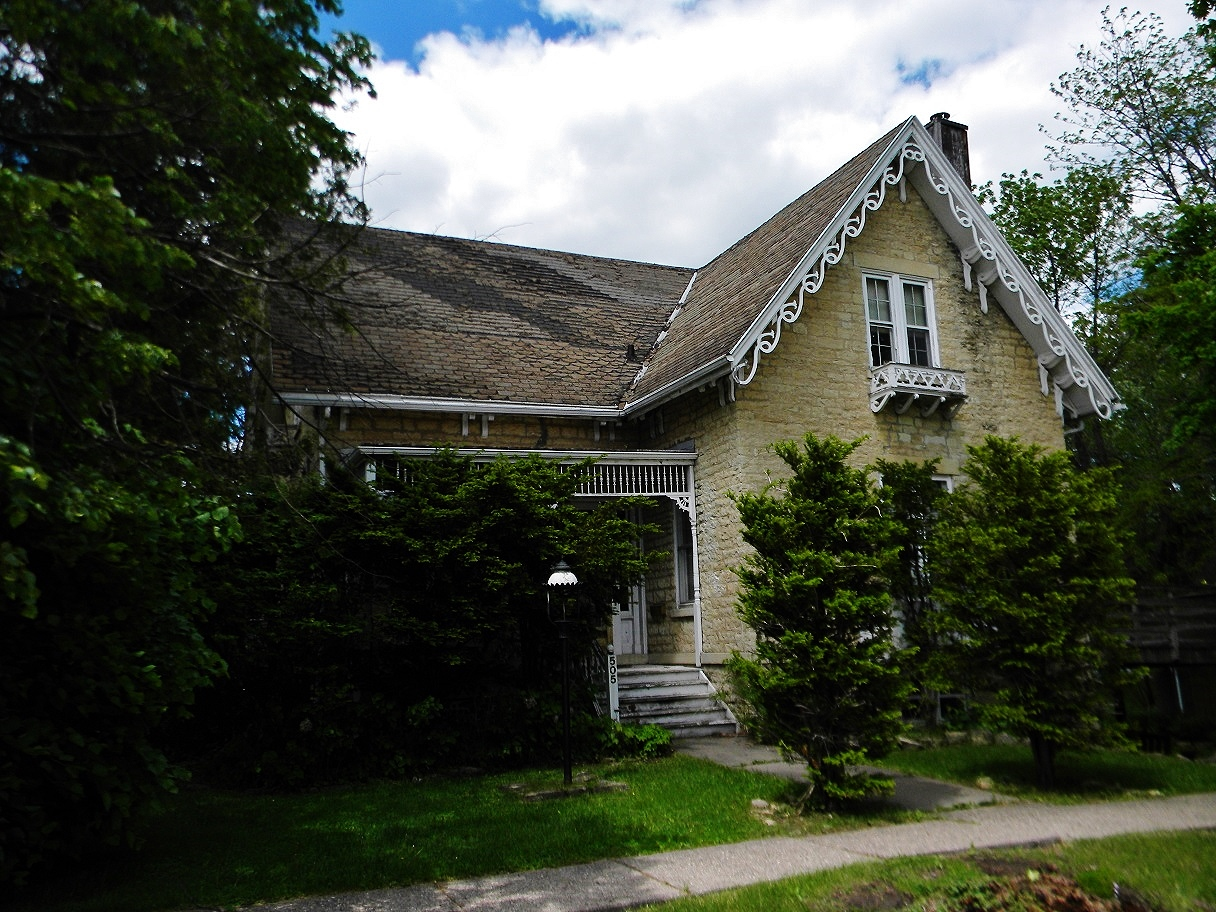

- Location within Iowa Location within the United States
- Location: 505 Court St., Bellevue, Iowa
- Coordinates: 42°15′24″N 90°25′42″W
- Area: less than one acre
- Built: 1858
- Architectural style: Gothic Revival
- MPS: Limestone Architecture of Jackson County MPS
- NRHP reference No.: 91001073
- Added to NRHP: August 30, 1991

The House at 505 Court Street is a historic residence located in Bellevue, Iowa, United States. It is one of over 217 limestone structures in Jackson County from the mid-19th century, of which 101 are houses. What differentiates this Gothic Revival style structure from most of the others is the "high style" decorative elements such as the vergeboards, and the brackets. Although the NRHP listing indicates that it was built in 1871, the property abstract indicates that it was more likely built in 1858. The 1½-story house follows an L-shaped plan. It features rather small coursed cut stone block with only a slight variation in size and shape, and dressed stone sills, lintels, and watertable. The house was listed on the National Register of Historic Places on August 30, 1991.
