= Lock and Dam No. 12 =

Dam in Illinois and Iowa, U.S.

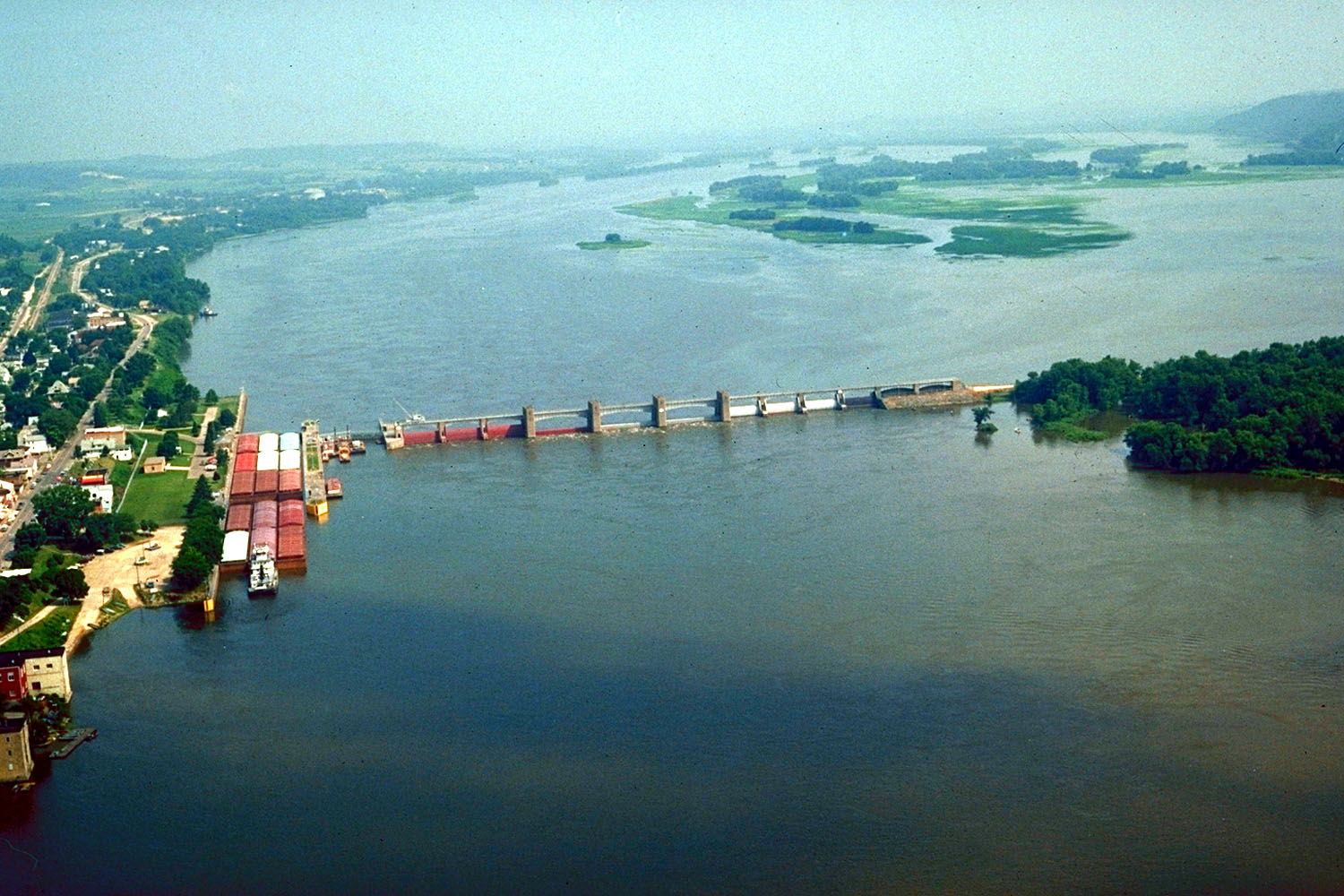
- Lock and Dam No. 12 on the Mississippi River. View is upriver to the north.
- Interactive map of Lock and Dam No. 12
- Location: Bellevue, Iowa / Hanover Township, Jo Daviess County, Illinois, USA
- Coordinates: 42°15′41.08″N 90°25′12.47″W
- Construction began: 1934-1939
- Opening date: May 13, 1939
- Operators: U.S. Army Corps of Engineers, Rock Island District

Dam and spillways
- Impounds: Upper Mississippi River
- Length: 8,369 feet (2,550.9 m)

Reservoir
- Creates: Pool 12
- Total capacity: 92,000 acre⋅ft (0.113 km^{3})
- Catchment area: 82,400 mi^{2} (213,000 km^{2})
- Lock and Dam No. 12 Historic District
- U.S. National Register of Historic Places
- U.S. Historic district
- Location within Iowa Location within the United States
- Location: 401 N. Riverview St., Bellevue, Iowa
- Area: 101.7 acres (41.2 ha)
- Built: 1939
- Architect: Edwin E. Abbot
- Architectural style: lock and dam
- MPS: Upper Mississippi River 9-Foot Navigation Project MPS
- NRHP reference No.: 04000172
- Added to NRHP: March 10, 2004

Lock and Dam No. 12 is a lock and dam located on the Upper Mississippi River at Bellevue, Iowa, United States. The movable portion of the dam starts at the locks adjacent to the Iowa shore and is 849 feet (258.8 m) long, consisting of seven tainter gates and three roller gates. It connects to a 200-foot (61.0 m) storage yard and continues toward the Illinois shore with a 2,750-foot (838.2 m) non-submersible dike, a 1,200-foot (365.8 m) submersible dike and a 3,130-foot (954.0 m) non-submersible dike. The non-submersible sections are separated from the submersible section with two 120-foot (36.6 m) transitional dikes. The main lock is 110 feet (33.5 m) wide by 600 feet (182.9 m) long. There is also an incomplete auxiliary lock. In 2004, the facility was listed in the National Register of Historic Places as Lock and Dam No. 12 Historic District, #04000172 covering 1,017 acres (4.1 km^{2}), 1 building, 3 structures, and 4 objects.

== See also ==
- Savanna Army Depot, adjoining the facility on the Illinois side
- Public Works Administration dams list
- Upper Mississippi River National Wildlife and Fish Refuge
