= Jackson County Courthouse (Bellevue, Iowa) =

- U.S. National Register of Historic Places
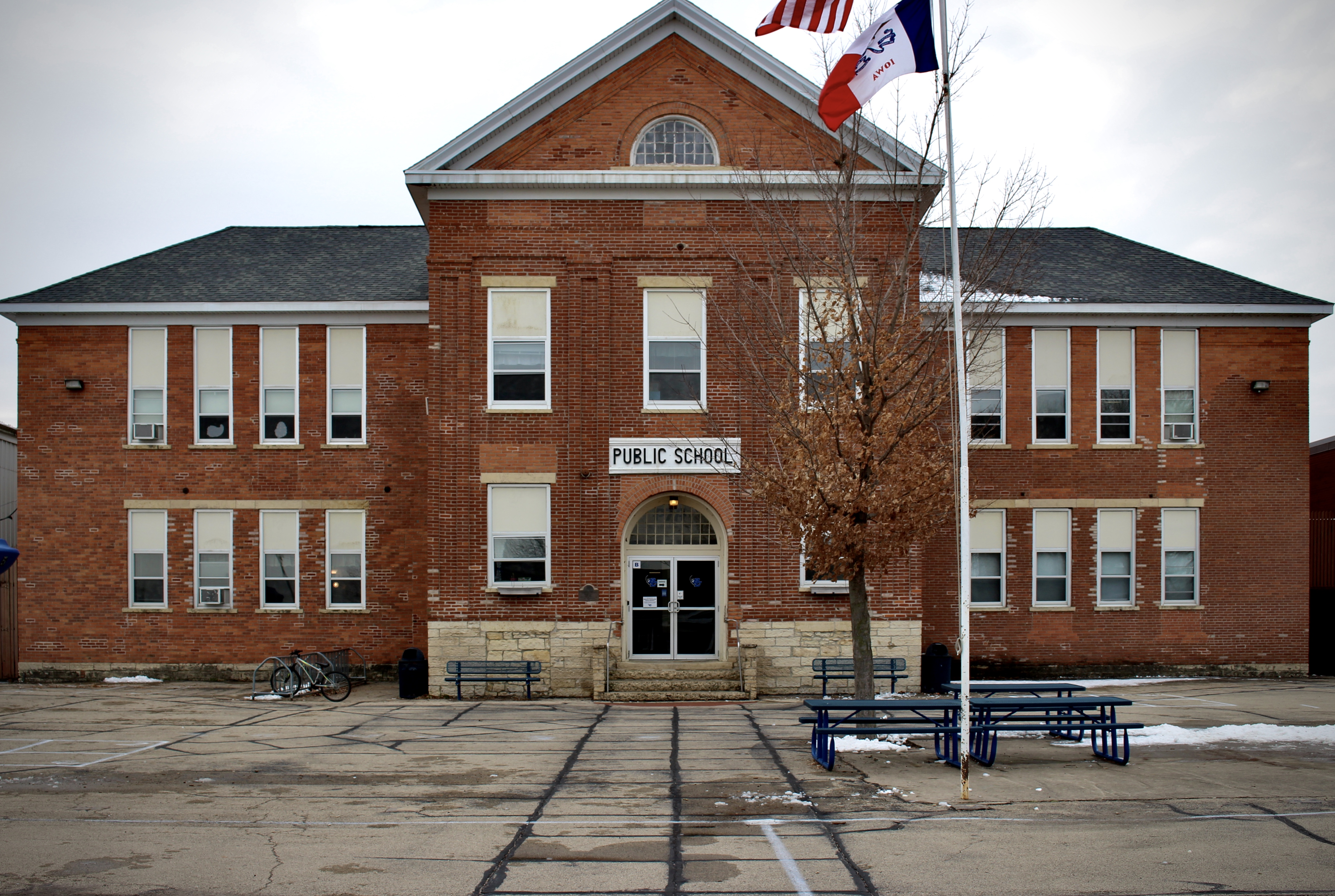
- The former Jackson County Courthouse, now an elementary school.

- Location within Iowa Location within the United States
- Location: Bounded by Third, State, Fourth, and Court Sts., Bellevue, Iowa
- Coordinates: 42°15′27″N 90°25′34″W
- Area: less than one acre
- Built: 1845
- Architect: Dohaney & Jones
- Architectural style: Greek Revival
- MPS: County Courthouses in Iowa TR
- NRHP reference No.: 81000248
- Added to NRHP: July 2, 1981

The Jackson County Courthouse, also known as Old Jackson County Courthouse or Bellevue Elementary School, is a historic building and former courthouse for Jackson County, Iowa, United States. It is located in Bellevue and was built in the vernacular Greek Revival style in 1845. It currently serves as a portion of Bellevue Elementary School, the oldest functioning school in the state of Iowa.

== History ==
When the Wisconsin Territory created Jackson, Jones, and Linn counties in 1837, Bellevue was named as the seat of justice for all three. Stock thief and counterfeiter W.W. Brown doctored a legitimate petition to have himself named as the organizing sheriff of Jackson County. The position went to Captain W.A. Warren instead.

Completed in 1845, this building is one of the oldest structures in Iowa used as a courthouse after Lee (1841) and Van Buren (1843) counties. It is also one of seven extant courthouse buildings in the Greek Revival style in the state. This building was a victim of the county seat rivalry that moved the Jackson County seat between Bellevue (1838–48), Andrew (1848-51), Bellevue again (1851–61), Andrew once more (1861-73), finally ending up in Maquoketa in 1873.

The courthouse was converted fully to use as a school in 1861, as of 2019 it is the pre-kindergarten through fifth grade Bellevue Elementary School in the Bellevue Community School District serving over 350 students. The original building has since been surrounded by additions. The south wing was added in 1870 and the north wing was added in 1872. A gymnasium and cafeteria were completed in the 1950s, and two 2-story classroom wings in the 1960s and 1970s. Previously, the courthouse was in a park-like, town square setting, but has since been paved with asphalt with trees removed. The building was added to the National Register of Historic Places on July 2, 1981.

== Architecture ==
The Old Jackson County Courthouse is a two-story, brick, vernacular Greek Revival structure. It takes the form of a traditional Greek temple without a portico. Unadorned, 2-story wings flank the main façade to the north and south. The building is capped with a hip roof with one gable. On the roof above the arched main entrance once stood a large cupola featuring a cloister vault shaped roof and large bell. The cupola was removed sometime during the mid 20th century due to deterioration and leaks in the roof. Other decorative elements of the building include a classical pediment with a returned cornice and half-moon window as well as simple brick projecting pilasters on all three sides of the main façade. Native limestone gathered from local quarries make up the exposed rough cut foundation, window sills, lintels, and front steps. Although the interior was altered drastically numerous times throughout the past 175 years to accommodate changing education practices and modern amenities, it still retains tin ceilings (mostly covered by dropped ceilings), much of its original woodwork (although heavily painted and damaged), and its grand stairway with large wooden newel posts. Other antique features include original schoolhouse style glass light fixtures from the early 1900s, cast iron radiators, and some original window panes.

== Future ==
Discussion began in 2017 to determine the future of the building. Following two failed bond referendums, taking place in 2018 and 2019 respectively, a third referendum was passed with 66% approval of school district voters. This $13.1 million bond measure will fund the construction of a 36,000 sq. ft. 2-story building at the current secondary school campus to house grades 3-5 and is to be completed in the summer of 2025. With reduced student attendance at the current elementary facility, the original 1845 structure will be largely vacated. Long term district plans envision a future addition to the new elementary building to ultimately house all PK-5 students. The current facility will likely be utilized into the 2030s before this plan is fully realized.

== See also ==
- Jackson County Courthouse (Maquoketa, Iowa)
