= Bellevue, Iowa =

- City
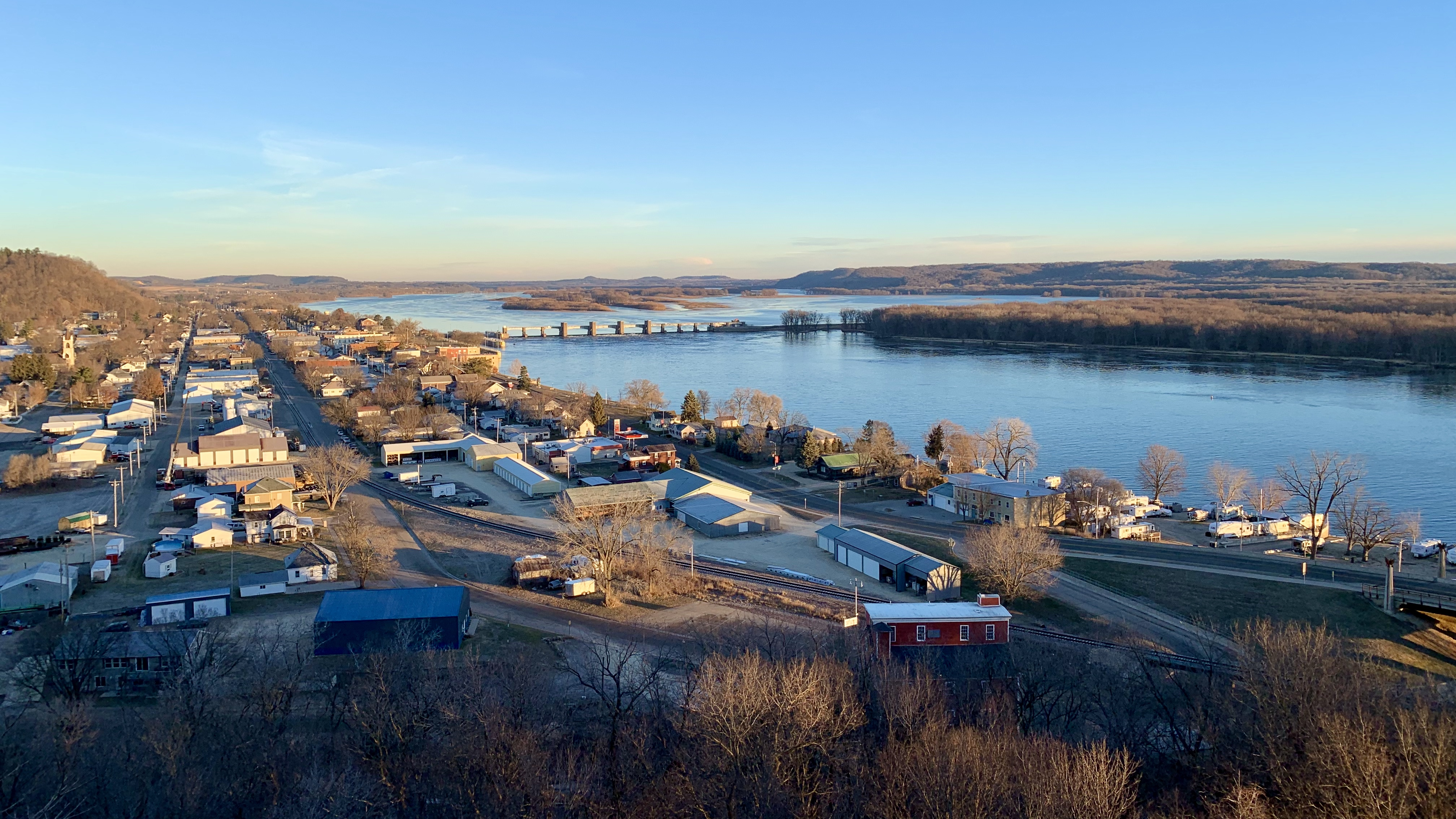
- Downtown Bellevue, Lock & Dam No. 12, and the Mississippi River from air.
- Motto: "A True Riverfront Experience"
- Location of Bellevue, Iowa

- Location in the United States Bellevue (the United States)
- Coordinates: 42°15′23″N 90°25′35″W
- Country: United States
- State: Iowa
- County: Jackson
- Founded; founder = John D. Bell: July 2, 1836
- Incorporated: February 5, 1851

Government
  - Type: Council-Administrator

Area
  - Total: 1.44 sq mi (3.74 km^{2})
  - Land: 1.37 sq mi (3.56 km^{2})
  - Water: 0.069 sq mi (0.18 km^{2})
- Elevation: 692 ft (211 m)

Population (2020)
  - Total: 2,363
  - Density: 1,718.6/sq mi (663.57/km^{2})
- Time zone: UTC-6 (Central (CST))
  - Summer (DST): UTC-5 (CDT)
- ZIP code: 52031
- Area code: 563
- FIPS code: 19-05635
- GNIS feature ID: 2394119
- Website: Bellevue, Iowa Website

Bellevue (/ˈbɛlvjuː/ BEL-vew) is a city in eastern Jackson County, Iowa, United States. The city lies along the Mississippi River (at Lock and Dam No. 12) and next to Bellevue State Park. In 2020, its population was 2,363; up from a count of 2,191 at the 2010 Census, making it the second-largest and only growing city in Jackson County.

The city lies in a valley created by two large bluffs (known as North and South Bluffs respectively), with the Mississippi River serving as the city's eastern border (the Illinois state border), and with the Mill Creek valley extending to the west. Geographically, it is part of the southernmost region of the Driftless Area, a portion of North America that escaped all three phases of the Wisconsinian Glaciation.

It is one of the few cities in Iowa to be built near large hills and bluffs, which account for much of the city's economic stimulation as a tourist town. The city attributes its name from the French words "belle" and "vue" meaning "beautiful view", as well as an early settler, John D. Bell. The unique history and architecture of Bellevue draw visitors year round, mainly from nearby large population centers (including Dubuque and Maquoketa).

== History ==
1. Jackson County, along with Jones and Linn Counties were established in 1837 and Bellevue was the named the seat of justice for all three counties. Prior to the formal opening of the county, Bellevue was laid out by John D. Bell in 1835. He built a cabin there and was the town's first postmaster. The first hotel was built by Peter Dutell in 1836, and was called the Bellevue House. When Iowa became a territory in 1838, the first census was taken and Jackson County had 881 people. The town of Bellevue constructed a city hall that serves as the Bellevue Public Library on the upper level.
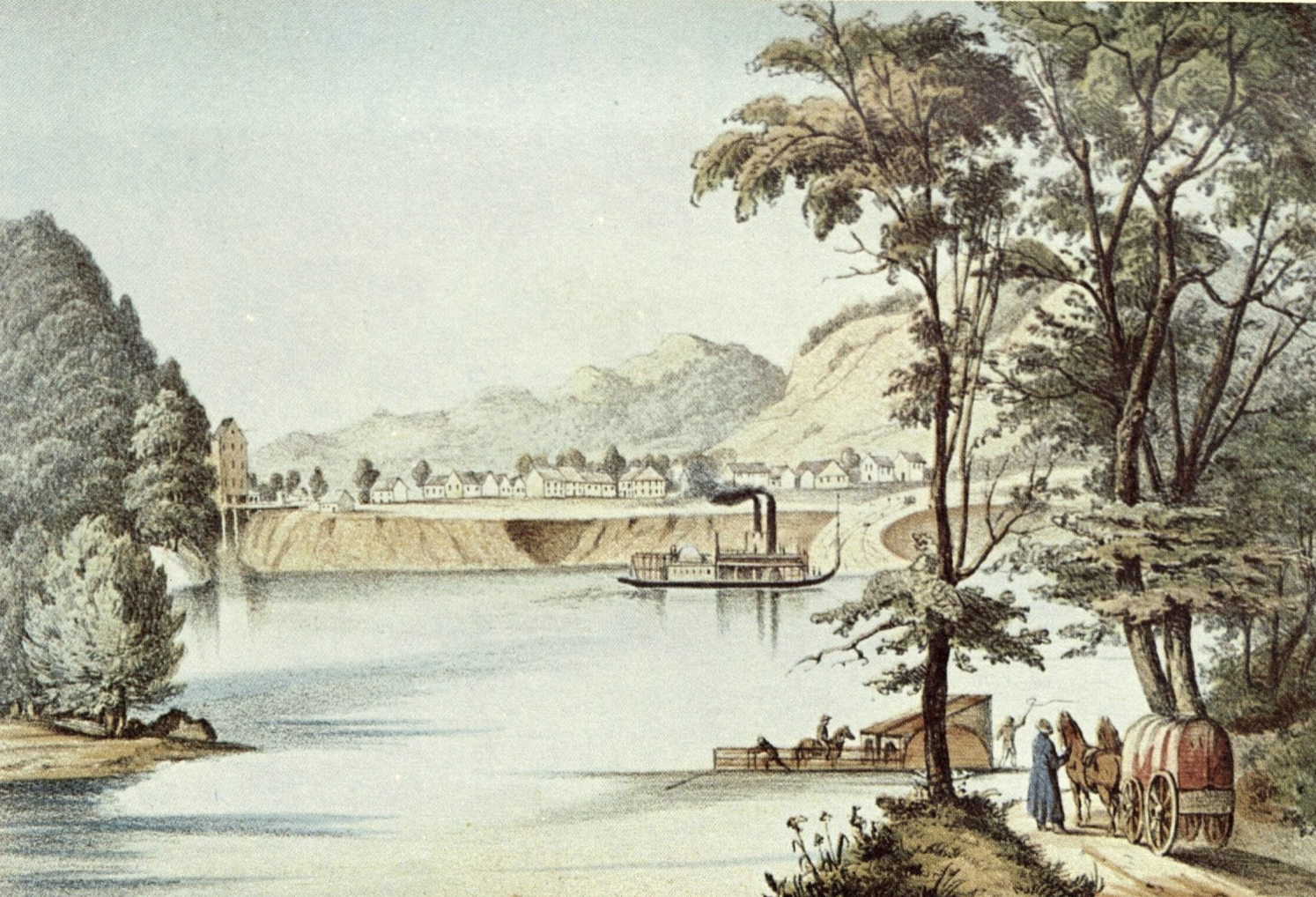
  Illustration of Bellevue, Iowa in 1848 from the Mississippi.
  The Bellevue War of 1840 gave the town an unsavory reputation and discouraged settlement in its aftermath. However, the population would double within two years. In 1838 the town of Andrew was designated as the county seat. Between 1848 and 1876, the struggle between Andrew and Bellevue for the county seat continued with the county seat being moved from one town to the other several times, with Bellevue constructing a county courthouse in 1845 that now serves as Bellevue Elementary, the oldest functioning school building in Iowa. As the county was settled, Maquoketa would become the dominant centrally located town when the railroad reached Maquoketa in 1873. The Town of Maquoketa then built a large city hall and offered to lease the building to Jackson County as a courthouse. The proposition was put to a vote and approved, and since then, Maquoketa has been the county seat.

== Geography ==
According to the United States Census Bureau, the city has a total area of 1.41 square miles (3.65 km^{2}), of which 1.34 square miles (3.47 km^{2}) is land and 0.07 square miles (0.18 km^{2}) is water.

=== Climate ===
Bellevue has a humid continental climate (Köppen Dfa), which gives it four distinct seasons. However, local weather is often not as extreme as that found in other parts of the Midwest, such as Minnesota or Wisconsin. Spring is usually wet and rainy, summers are sunny and warm, autumn is mild, and winters are typically cloudy and snowy.

Climate data for Bellevue, Iowa (1991–2020 normals, extremes 1941–present)
Month	Jan	Feb	Mar	Apr	May	Jun	Jul	Aug	Sep	Oct	Nov	Dec	Year
Record high °F (°C)	63 (17)	74 (23)	87 (31)	94 (34)	95 (35)	100 (38)	103 (39)	103 (39)	99 (37)	95 (35)	77 (25)	67 (19)	103 (39)
Mean daily maximum °F (°C)	28.9 (−1.7)	33.5 (0.8)	45.7 (7.6)	59.3 (15.2)	71.1 (21.7)	81.1 (27.3)	84.6 (29.2)	82.7 (28.2)	75.9 (24.4)	62.6 (17.0)	47.2 (8.4)	34.2 (1.2)	58.9 (14.9)
Daily mean °F (°C)	20.5 (−6.4)	24.3 (−4.3)	36.0 (2.2)	48.3 (9.1)	59.8 (15.4)	69.9 (21.1)	73.6 (23.1)	71.8 (22.1)	64.0 (17.8)	51.7 (10.9)	38.3 (3.5)	26.5 (−3.1)	48.7 (9.3)
Mean daily minimum °F (°C)	12.1 (−11.1)	15.1 (−9.4)	26.3 (−3.2)	37.4 (3.0)	48.4 (9.1)	58.8 (14.9)	62.7 (17.1)	60.9 (16.1)	52.2 (11.2)	40.7 (4.8)	29.3 (−1.5)	18.9 (−7.3)	38.6 (3.7)
Record low °F (°C)	−35 (−37)	−34 (−37)	−23 (−31)	5 (−15)	23 (−5)	35 (2)	41 (5)	32 (0)	24 (−4)	14 (−10)	−9 (−23)	−26 (−32)	−35 (−37)
Average precipitation inches (mm)	1.30 (33)	1.58 (40)	2.16 (55)	3.77 (96)	4.21 (107)	5.58 (142)	4.33 (110)	3.78 (96)	3.65 (93)	3.18 (81)	2.34 (59)	1.93 (49)	37.81 (960)
Average snowfall inches (cm)	9.3 (24)	8.3 (21)	3.9 (9.9)	0.4 (1.0)	0.1 (0.25)	0.0 (0.0)	0.0 (0.0)	0.0 (0.0)	0.0 (0.0)	0.2 (0.51)	1.3 (3.3)	8.4 (21)	31.9 (81)
Average precipitation days (≥ 0.01 in)	8.2	7.7	8.7	10.6	12.4	10.7	9.0	8.4	8.5	8.2	8.0	8.6	109.0
Average snowy days (≥ 0.1 in)	5.1	4.1	1.8	0.2	0.0	0.0	0.0	0.0	0.0	0.1	0.8	4.2	16.3
Source: NOAA

== Demographics ==
Historical populations
Year	Pop.	±%
1850	362	—
1860	929	+156.6%
1870	1,353	+45.6%
1880	1,581	+16.9%
1890	1,394	−11.8%
1900	1,607	+15.3%
1910	1,776	+10.5%
1920	1,663	−6.4%
1930	1,717	+3.2%
1940	1,771	+3.1%
1950	1,932	+9.1%
1960	2,181	+12.9%
1970	2,336	+7.1%
1980	2,450	+4.9%
1990	2,239	−8.6%
2000	2,350	+5.0%
2010	2,191	−6.8%
2020	2,363	+7.9%
Source:U.S. Census Bureau and Iowa Data Center; Source: U.S. Decennial Census

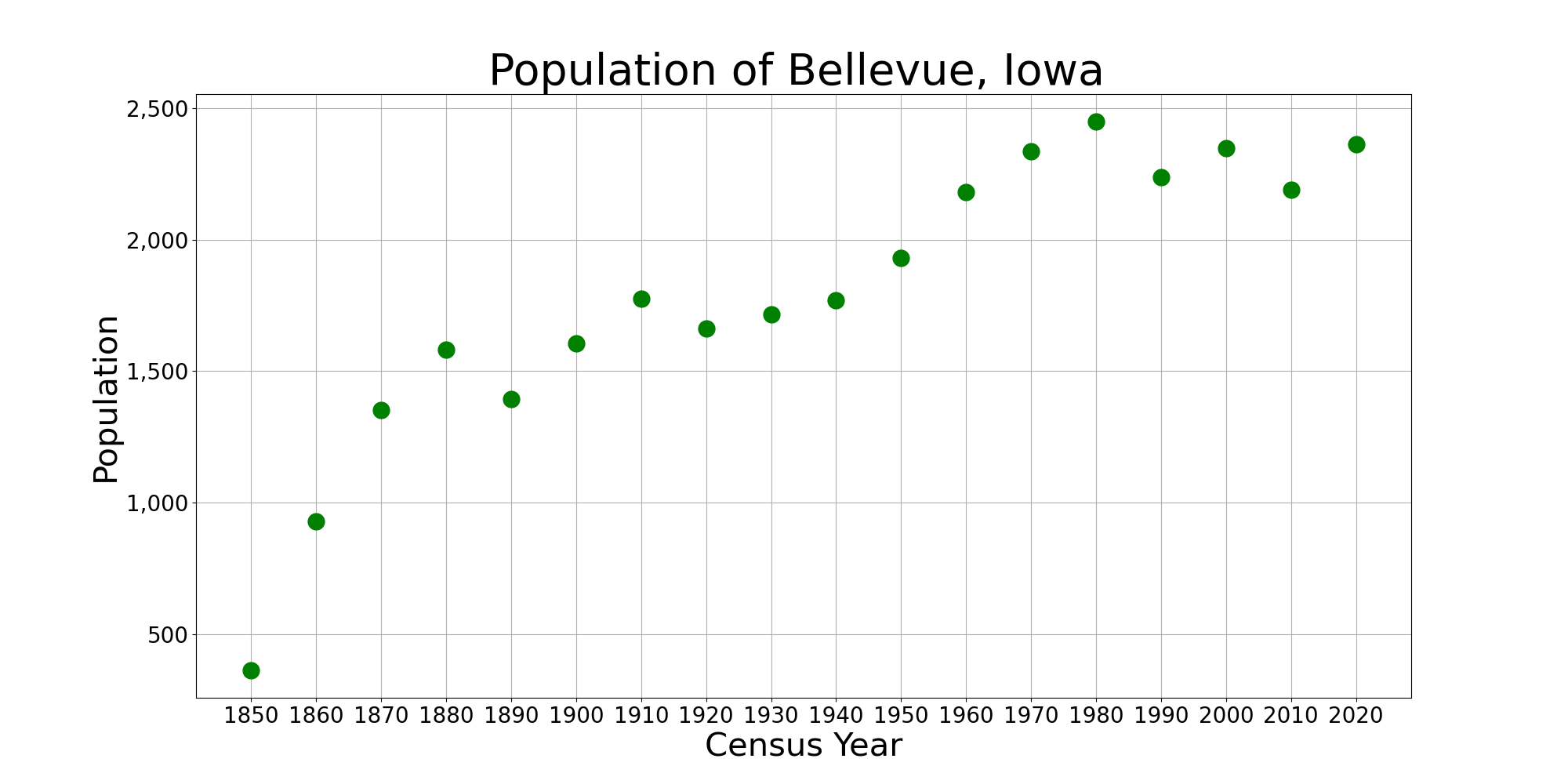
The population of Bellevue, Iowa from US census data

=== 2020 census ===
As of the 2020 census, there were 2,363 people, 1,011 households, and 646 families residing in the city. The median age was 44.6 years. 22.8% of residents were under the age of 18, and 24.6% were 65 years of age or older. For every 100 females, there were 91.5 males, and for every 100 females age 18 and over there were 88.8 males.

The population density was 1,718.6 inhabitants per square mile (663.6/km^{2}). There were 1,115 housing units at an average density of 811.0 per square mile (313.1/km^{2}). Of all housing units, 9.3% were vacant; the homeowner vacancy rate was 1.0% and the rental vacancy rate was 9.9%.

0.0% of residents lived in urban areas, while 100.0% lived in rural areas.

Of the 1,011 households, 26.7% had children under the age of 18 living with them, 50.1% were married-couple households, 6.1% were cohabiting-couple households, 27.6% had a female householder with no spouse or partner present, and 16.1% had a male householder with no spouse or partner present. 36.1% of households were non-families; 31.9% of households were made up of individuals, and 15.6% had someone living alone who was 65 years old or older.

By age, 25.3% of residents were under 20; 4.1% were from 20 to 24; 20.9% were from 25 to 44; 25.1% were from 45 to 64; and 24.6% were 65 years of age or older. The gender makeup of the city was 47.8% male and 52.2% female.

Racial composition as of the 2020 census
Race	Number	Percent
White	2,279	96.4%
Black or African American	7	0.3%
American Indian and Alaska Native	5	0.2%
Asian	5	0.2%
Native Hawaiian and Other Pacific Islander	0	0.0%
Some other race	7	0.3%
Two or more races	60	2.5%
Hispanic or Latino (of any race)	21	0.9%

=== 2010 census ===
As of the census of 2010, there were 2,191 people, 966 households, and 584 families residing in the city. The population density was 1,635.1 inhabitants per square mile (631.3/km^{2}). There were 1,120 housing units at an average density of 835.8 per square mile (322.7/km^{2}). The racial makeup of the city was 99.0% White, 0.1% African American, 0.1% Native American, 0.2% from other races, and 0.6% from two or more races. Hispanic or Latino of any race were 0.8% of the population.

There were 966 households, of which 24.9% had children under the age of 18 living with them, 50.0% were married couples living together, 7.2% had a female householder with no husband present, 3.2% had a male householder with no wife present, and 39.5% were non-families. 34.9% of all households were made up of individuals, and 19.1% had someone living alone who was 65 years of age or older. The average household size was 2.20 and the average family size was 2.84.

The median age in the city was 46.8 years. 20.7% of residents were under the age of 18; 6.9% were between the ages of 18 and 24; 20.2% were from 25 to 44; 27.3% were from 45 to 64; and 24.9% were 65 years of age or older. The gender makeup of the city was 47.0% male and 53.0% female.

=== 2000 census ===
As of the census of 2000, there were 2,350 people, 942 households, and 629 families residing in the city. The population density was 2,410.7 inhabitants per square mile (930.8/km^{2}). There were 1,012 housing units at an average density of 1,038.1 per square mile (400.8/km^{2}). The racial makeup of the city was 99.79% White, 0.04% Asian, and 0.17% from two or more races. Hispanic or Latino of any race were 0.47% of the population.

There were 942 households, out of which 32.2% had children under the age of 18 living with them, 56.6% were married couples living together, 7.7% had a female householder with no husband present, and 33.2% were non-families. 29.7% of all households were made up of individuals, and 17.8% had someone living alone who was 65 years of age or older. The average household size was 2.41 and the average family size was 3.01.

25.4% are under the age of 18, 6.4% from 18 to 24, 25.1% from 25 to 44, 20.7% from 45 to 64, and 22.3% who were 65 years of age or older. The median age was 40 years. For every 100 females, there were 91.7 males. For every 100 females age 18 and over, there were 86.9 males.

The median income for a household in the city was $35,293, and the median income for a family was $44,438. Males had a median income of $35,507 versus $20,791 for females. The per capita income for the city was $15,928. About 5.0% of families and 7.3% of the population were below the poverty line, including 5.3% of those under age 18 and 13.1% of those age 65 or over.

== Culture ==
Bellevue has a rich history that has greatly influenced the culture of the city. The prehistoric Woodland Native Americans made their homes in the fertile valleys where Bellevue lies. Much later, so did the Thâkîwaki and the Meskwaki of which evidence can be found in the form of burial mounds high on the south bluff overlooking the river. The European pioneers arrived as fur traders, farmers, and merchants looking to settle new land beginning in 1833; many floating across the Mississippi River on logs. These early settlers formed Bell View, the oldest city in the county and one of the five oldest cities in Iowa. The spelling was later changed to the French, Belle Vue and in time the two words were united and the town became Bellevue.

Today, the Sac and Fox Tribe of the Mississippi in Iowa maintain ancestral attachments to the Bellevue area.

=== Historic Sites ===
Historical Site	Year built	Location	Image	Description
Jackson County Courthouse	1845	100 South Third Street, Bellevue		Bellevue was named the county seat in 1837 before Iowa was a state. The Greek Revival style courthouse was built in 1845 to house the Jackson County Courthouse but in 1849, the county seat was moved from Bellevue to Andrew because it was a more central location. The structure was again the county courthouse from 1851 to 1861 during the controversy over where to locate the county seat and then moved again to Andrew after which the building was used as a public school. This style of courthouse is one of few remaining in the state.
Potter's Mill	1843	300 Potter Drive, Bellevue		Potter's Mill, a tavern and bed and breakfast that was formerly a flour mill built in 1843 is located in Bellevue. Potter's Mill is currently named on the National Register of Historic Places. Jasper Mill was built by Elbridge G. Potter to mill flour and this 3 story frame structure housed an active milling business until 1969. This mill made use of terraced rapids on Mill Creek with a 20-foot rock dam constructed by Potter to serve the turbines and grist mill. At Potter's Jasper Mill they purchased grain by the bushel, ground and bagged it, and sold under the Jasper name. These products of Jasper Mill enjoyed a national reputation. Nominated to the National Register of Historic Places in 1980, Potter's Mill has been restored.
George Dyas House	1850s	23852 362nd Avenue, Bellevue		The George Dyas House is the westernmost of a group of houses and agricultural buildings known as the Dyas Farm. This limestone home is one of the first examples of limestone architecture in Jackson County.
William Dyas Barn	1850s	41088 243rd Street, Bellevue		The William Dyas Barn is one of only 9 standing limestone barns in the county and is still in use. The barn is built into the side of a hill with the second floor door at ground level in back, a true bank barn.
Mont Rest	1893	300 Spring Street, Bellevue		This building was built in 1893 for $6,000 by Seth Luellyn Baker. He was a wealthy land developer who owned hotels, gold mines and paddle boats on the Mississippi. Seth Baker was originally from Bellevue and came back to buy what was known as the north bluff of Bellevue. He named the property Mont Rest. The locals almost immediately started calling Mont Rest "The Castle" because of its unusual architecture and its towering presence over the town.

== Education ==
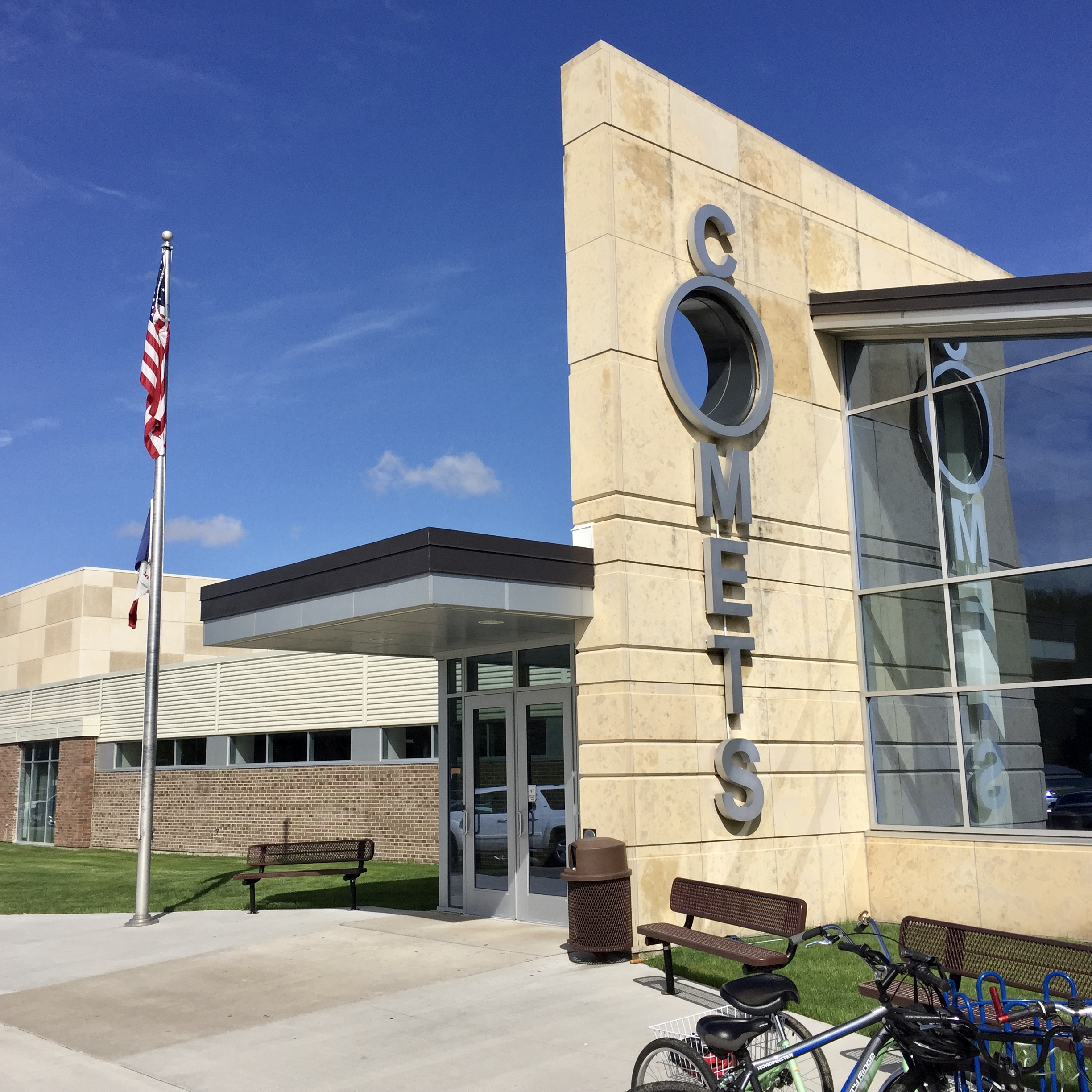
Main entrance of the Bellevue High & Middle School campus.

=== Public education ===
Bellevue Community School District provides educational services to Bellevue, as well as the surrounding countryside and cities of La Motte, Springbrook, and St. Donatus. The school's colors are royal blue and white, and their mascot/team name is the Comets. Bellevue High School is located on a campus on the western edge of town, which also includes an attached middle school and athletic facilities. The high school underwent significant renovations in 2010, with the addition of a gymnasium, stage, cafeteria, student commons, locker rooms, Hall of Pride, and district offices. The Bellevue Community School District also includes the public Bellevue Elementary School, located in the pre-Civil War Jackson County Courthouse which was built in 1845. The district supports free preschool and grades PK-12, with a total enrollment of 765 students in the 2019–2020 school year. In October 2019, school officials reported that enrollment for the district increased 10% over the past 5 years, contrary to State officials who have predicted a long term declining enrollment trend.

=== Private education ===
Marquette Catholic is a private school in town. Its colors are red and white, and its team name is the Defenders. They support grades PK-12. The school underwent major renovations in 2015 when the buildings were connected, a new cafeteria/gym was added, a Parish Center was added on, and additional storage areas were created. Significant improvements were also made in 2014 when a high school wing of the building was added. Within Marquette Catholic Schools is Blessed Beginnings Daycare. Marquette's enrollment for students in PK-12 is 253 students.

== Infrastructure ==
=== Transportation ===
==== Highways ====
Bellevue radiates from the intersection of US HWY 52 (Riverview Dr.) and Iowa HWY 62 (State St). US HWY 52 continues north to St. Donatus and Dubuque and south to Sabula, before entering Savanna, Illinois via the new Dale Gardner Veterans Memorial Bridge. Highway 62 continues on to Andrew and terminates in the county seat, Maquoketa. Other roads coming into the city are Bellevue-Cascade Road (County D61) which terminates near Cascade, and Mill Creek Road (County D56) which terminates in La Motte.

==== River ====
Historically, there were hundreds of river steamboats that stopped at the grand staircase that led from the higher Riverfront Park to the riverbank to transfer passengers and necessary goods. The Mississippi River still is an essential route of economical transport for freight (with barges frequently passing), but no longer regularly carries commercial goods or passengers. Towards the mid 20th century travel by riverboat was no longer the best mode of transportation, and that aspect of travel diminished along Bellevue's banks. In the 21st century there has been an uptick in leisure cruises on recreations of large historical steamships that act as cruise vessels on the Mississippi. With Lock and Dam No. 12 bisecting the river, these steamships occasionally stop to let off passengers to shop and eat at establishments along Riverview Drive as they wait to lock through.

The city offers multiple locations to launch vessels, including the Municipal Boat Ramp (found below Riverview Park at the intersection of State Street and Riverview Drive), Bellevue Public Area Ramp (found south of town along US HWY 52), and at the Pleasant Creek Recreation Area (found 4 miles south of town along US HWY 52). Spruce Creek Park, located 3 miles north of Bellevue off of 395th Ave, offers a boat ramp as well as a large harbor for storage of boats, with some covered boat slips. The harbor is managed by Jackson County Conservation.

==== Airport ====
The nearest moderately sized commercial airport is Dubuque Regional Airport south of Dubuque, IA along US HWY 61. Some small local airports in Maquoketa, Clinton, and Davenport serve small aircraft and agricultural purposes, with the nearest large commercial location being the Quad City International Airport in Moline, IL

==== Rail ====
In the center of the town, there is an on-street running railroad used for long freight trains. The railway is frequently used and divides Second Street on either side of it. Streets crossing this rail line include (from north to south) Jefferson Ave, Motte St, High St, Park St, Market St, State St (HWY 62), Jefferson St, Chestnut St, Vine St, and an underpass at the south end of 2nd St (Potter Dr). Formerly, a depot and rail yard supported passenger traffic along the now defunct Chicago, Bellevue, Cascade & Western Railway Company, which was a narrow-gauge railway. Since its closure in the 1930s, the east–west running railroad was broken up, leaving the remaining north–south standard gauge railway that remain today under the control of the Alberta based Canadian Pacific Railway. There no longer are any passenger trains on Bellevue's rails.
