= Andrew, Iowa =

- City
- Location of Andrew, Iowa
- Coordinates: 42°09′12″N 90°35′32″W
- Country: United States
- State: Iowa
- County: Jackson
- Incorporated: August 4, 1863

Area
  - Total: 0.25 sq mi (0.64 km^{2})
  - Land: 0.25 sq mi (0.64 km^{2})
  - Water: 0 sq mi (0.00 km^{2})
- Elevation: 883 ft (269 m)

Population (2020)
  - Total: 380
  - Density: 1,532.5/sq mi (591.69/km^{2})
- Time zone: UTC-6 (Central (CST))
  - Summer (DST): UTC-5 (CDT)
- ZIP code: 52030
- Area code: 563
- FIPS code: 19-02125
- GNIS feature ID: 2393957
- Website: andrewia.com

Andrew is a city in central Jackson County, Iowa, United States. The population was 380 at the 2020 census.

== History ==
Andrew, located in Jackson County, was named for the seventh president, Andrew Jackson.

In 1841 Ansel Briggs, the first governor of Iowa, settled on a location outside of Andrew known as Bluff Mills, later moving his family to town. He became the Jackson County deputy treasurer in 1843 then began a two-year term as Sheriff of Jackson County in 1844. Ansel Briggs won the election against Thomas McKnight for the governor of Iowa in 1846. Briggs served as governor until 1850. On September 22, 1909, the citizens of Andrew erected a granite monument in the city cemetery in his honor. Although Briggs was originally buried in Omaha, Nebraska, he was re-interred in 1909 in the Andrew Cemetery.

Andrew was incorporated in 1863, with the first record of ordinances recorded in 1867. The county seat switched between Bellevue and Andrew several times until it was moved to Maquoketa in 1873. The county seat was responsible for much of the growth of the city. An orphans asylum and courthouse was built along with other structures to serve the county government.

The Jackson County Jailhouse was built in 1870 and is now listed on the National Register of Historic Places. The three-story limestone structure includes sheriff's office, cell room, exercise yard, a jailer quarters, and prison kitchen. The jailhouse has since been restored and tours are given.

The first school was made of logs in 1841 and the second was a framed structure. A brick building was built in 1889 at the present location of the school, 13 South Marion Street. Andrew Community School conducts preschool through eighth grade level classes, with the former high school being closed in 2011.

Andrew is the birthplace of the first American military casualty of World War II, Captain Robert M. Losey, who was killed during a German Luftwaffe bombing of Dombås, Norway.

Andrew has three churches: St John's Catholic Church (closed), First Presbyterian Church, and Salem Lutheran Church. Salem Lutheran Church was organized in 1863 and built one of Iowa's first orphanages.

=== Public Services and Recreation ===
==== Public Library ====
The Andrew Public Library is located in the City Hall on 11 E. Benton Street. Books are available for all ages with a special program held for children of the community during the summer.

==== Andrew City Park ====
The city park is located in the center of town and is the location of the historic Jackson County Jailhouse. The park offers a pavilion and playground equipment.

==== Fishing ====
Brush Creek is located just two miles outside of Andrew and the Mississippi River is fourteen miles northeast on Highway 62 at the intersection of Highway 52 in downtown Bellevue.

== Geography ==
According to the United States Census Bureau, the city has a total area of 0.27 square miles (0.70 km^{2}), all land.

== Demographics ==
Historical populations
Year	Pop.	±%
1870	352	—
1880	288	−18.2%
1890	307	+6.6%
1900	273	−11.1%
1910	307	+12.5%
1920	289	−5.9%
1930	212	−26.6%
1940	263	+24.1%
1950	280	+6.5%
1960	349	+24.6%
1970	335	−4.0%
1980	349	+4.2%
1990	319	−8.6%
2000	460	+44.2%
2010	434	−5.7%
2020	380	−12.4%
Source:"U.S. Census website". United States Census Bureau. and Iowa Data Center; Source: U.S. Decennial Census

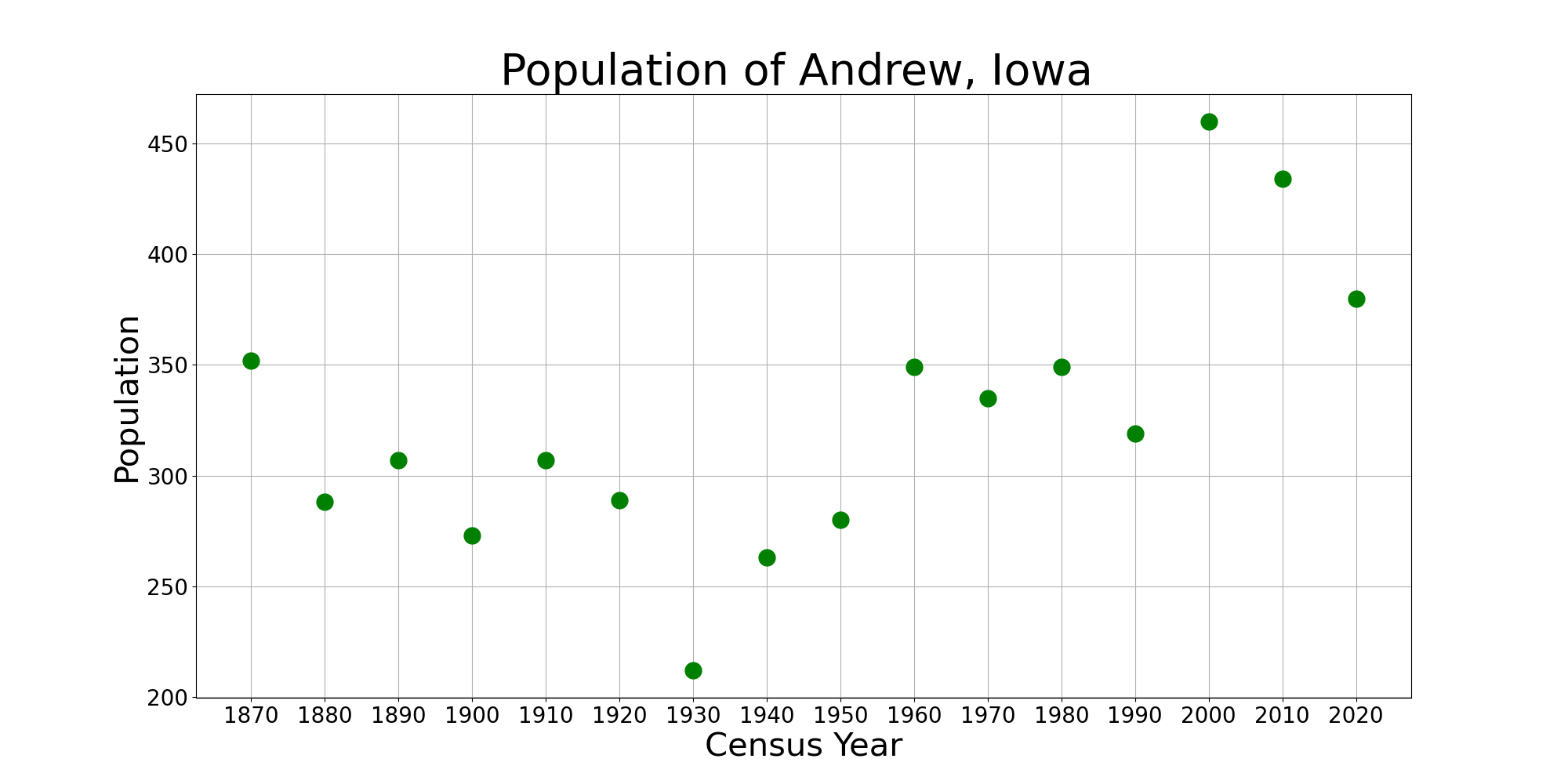
The population of Andrew, Iowa from US census data

=== 2020 census ===
As of the census of 2020, there were 380 people, 144 households, and 95 families residing in the city. The population density was 1,532.5 inhabitants per square mile (591.7/km^{2}). There were 166 housing units at an average density of 669.4 per square mile (258.5/km^{2}). The racial makeup of the city was 92.1% White, 5.3% Black or African American, 0.0% Native American, 0.0% Asian, 0.0% Pacific Islander, 0.8% from other races and 1.8% from two or more races. Hispanic or Latino persons of any race comprised 0.8% of the population.

Of the 144 households, 39.6% of which had children under the age of 18 living with them, 47.2% were married couples living together, 9.7% were cohabitating couples, 22.2% had a female householder with no spouse or partner present and 20.8% had a male householder with no spouse or partner present. 34.0% of all households were non-families. 31.9% of all households were made up of individuals, 14.6% had someone living alone who was 65 years old or older.

The median age in the city was 35.8 years. 31.3% of the residents were under the age of 20; 5.0% were between the ages of 20 and 24; 26.3% were from 25 and 44; 26.3% were from 45 and 64; and 11.1% were 65 years of age or older. The gender makeup of the city was 50.8% male and 49.2% female.

=== 2010 census ===
As of the census of 2010, there were 434 people, 155 households, and 108 families residing in the city. The population density was 1,607.4 inhabitants per square mile (620.6/km^{2}). There were 173 housing units at an average density of 640.7 per square mile (247.4/km^{2}). The racial makeup of the city was 98.8% White, 0.5% African American, and 0.7% from two or more races. Hispanic or Latino of any race were 0.5% of the population.

There were 155 households, of which 40.0% had children under the age of 18 living with them, 51.0% were married couples living together, 11.6% had a female householder with no husband present, 7.1% had a male householder with no wife present, and 30.3% were non-families. 20.0% of all households were made up of individuals, and 7.1% had someone living alone who was 65 years of age or older. The average household size was 2.80 and the average family size was 3.29.

The median age in the city was 30.6 years. 30.9% of residents were under the age of 18; 10.2% were between the ages of 18 and 24; 27.6% were from 25 to 44; 20.7% were from 45 to 64; and 10.6% were 65 years of age or older. The gender makeup of the city was 52.5% male and 47.5% female.

=== 2000 census ===
As of the census of 2000, there were 460 people, 165 households, and 120 families residing in the city. The population density was 1,747.9 inhabitants per square mile (674.9/km^{2}). There were 169 housing units at an average density of 642.2 per square mile (248.0/km^{2}). The racial makeup of the city was 99.13% White, 0.22% Native American, and 0.65% from two or more races. Hispanic or Latino of any race were 2.83% of the population.

There were 165 households, out of which 45.5% had children under the age of 18 living with them, 53.9% were married couples living together, 13.9% had a female householder with no husband present, and 26.7% were non-families. 23.0% of all households were made up of individuals, and 13.9% had someone living alone who was 65 years of age or older. The average household size was 2.79 and the average family size was 3.20.

In the city, the population was spread out, with 34.6% under the age of 18, 6.3% from 18 to 24, 32.6% from 25 to 44, 13.9% from 45 to 64, and 12.6% who were 65 years of age or older. The median age was 32 years. For every 100 females, there were 110.0 males. For every 100 females age 18 and over, there were 94.2 males.

The median income for a household in the city was $36,563, and the median income for a family was $35,938. Males had a median income of $28,333 versus $22,222 for females. The per capita income for the city was $12,860. About 6.1% of families and 9.3% of the population were below the poverty line, including 8.1% of those under age 18 and 7.3% of those age 65 or over.

== Education ==
Andrew School is a public kindergarten through 8th grade school located in town. The school also supported grades 9-12 before 2011, however high school students now have the option to open enroll to either Bellevue High School in Bellevue or Maquoketa High School in Maquoketa. The schools colors are black and gold and their team name/mascot is the hawks. Andrew Community School has been in operation since 1913. The school is part of Iowa's Big East Conference. Andrew formerly was a Class 1A school and was considered small even for 1A. Notable athletic achievements include the Andrew girls' 1997 track and field Class 1A State Championship title and the girls' basketball team's state qualification in 2007.

== Notable people ==
- Robert Losey, an aeronautical meteorologist who is considered to be the first American military casualty of World War II
- Ansel Briggs, first governor of Iowa, lived in Andrew before and after his governorship

== See also ==
- National Register of Historic Places listings in Jackson County, Iowa
