= Central School =

Central School may refer to:

== China ==
- The Government Central School, now Queen's College, Hong Kong

== India ==
- Kendriya Vidyalaya, (Hindi for Central School), a system of central government schools under the Ministry of Education, Government of India

== United Kingdom ==
- Central school, a historic type of secondary school
- Central School of Speech and Drama, Swiss Cottage, London
- Central School of Art and Design, now Central Saint Martins College of Art and Design, Southampton Row, London
- The Central Tutorial School for Young Musicians, now the Purcell School

== United States ==
- Central School (Peoria, Arizona), listed on the National Register of Historic Places (NRHP) in Maricopa, Arizona
- Central Grammar School, Simsbury, Connecticut; see Horace Belden School and Central Grammar School
- Central School (Milton, Florida)
- Central School (Wilmette, Illinois)
- Central School (Canton, Iowa)
- Central School (Lake City, Iowa)
- Central School (East Lansing, Michigan)
- Central School (Iron River, Michigan)
- Central School (Pontiac, Michigan)
- Central School (Grand Rapids, Minnesota)
- Central Grade School (Winona, Minnesota)
- Central School Campus, De Soto, Missouri
- Central School (Asheboro, North Carolina)
- Central School (Bessemer City, North Carolina)
- Central School Historic District, Kings Mountain, North Carolina
- Central School (Laurinburg, North Carolina)
- Central School (Ticonderoga, New York)
- Central School in Amherst, Ohio, listed on the NRHP in Lorain County, Ohio
- Central School (Martins Ferry, Ohio)
- Central School in Milton-Freewater, Oregon, listed on the NRHP in Umatilla County, Oregon
- Central School, the first school in the Webb City R-7 School District

== See also ==
- Central High School (disambiguation)
- Central Elementary School
