= Central High School =

Central High School may refer to:

== In the United States ==
=== Alabama ===
- Central High School (Phenix City, Alabama)
- Central High School (Tuscaloosa, Alabama)
- Central High School (Hayneville, Alabama)

=== Arizona ===
- Central High School (Phoenix, Arizona)

=== Arkansas ===
- Buffalo Island Central High School, Monette
- Central High School (Helena–West Helena, Arkansas), West Helena
- Drew Central High School, Monticello
- Genoa Central High School, Texarkana
- Little Rock Central High School, Pulaski County
- White County Central High School, Judsonia

=== California ===
- Central Union High School (El Centro, California)
- Central Valley High School (Bakersfield, California), a high school in California
- Central High School (Fresno, California)

=== Colorado ===
- Aurora Central High School, Aurora
- Central High School (Grand Junction, Colorado)
- Greeley Central High School, Greeley
- Central High School (Pueblo, Colorado)

=== Connecticut ===
- Central High School (Connecticut), Bridgeport
- Bristol Central High School, Bristol

=== Delaware ===
- Sussex Central High School (Delaware), Georgetown

=== District of Columbia ===
- Central High School (Washington, D.C.)

=== Florida ===
- Central High School (Brooksville, Florida)
- Central High School (Milton, Florida)
- Fort Pierce Central High School, Fort Pierce
- Miami Central High School, Miami
- Palm Beach Central High School, Wellington
- St. Petersburg High School, St. Petersburg

=== Georgia ===
- Clarke Central High School, Athens
- Gordon Central High School, Calhoun
- Central High School (Carrollton, Georgia)
- Forsyth Central High School, Cumming
- Central Gwinnett High School, Lawrenceville
- Central High School (Macon, Georgia)

=== Illinois ===
- Central Community High School (Breese, Illinois)
- Central High School (Burlington, Illinois)
- Central High School (Camp Point, Illinois)
- Central High School (Clifton, Illinois)
- Champaign Central High School, Champaign
- Crystal Lake Central High School, Crystal Lake
- Evansville Central High School, Evansville
- Galena High School (Illinois), formerly Central
- Hinsdale Central High School, Hinsdale
- Naperville Central High School, Naperville
- Peoria High School (Peoria, Illinois), locally known as "Central"
- Plainfield Central High School, Plainfield

=== Indiana ===
- Brownstown Central High School
- Corydon Central High School
- Central High School (East Chicago, Indiana)
- Elkhart Central High School
- Evansville Central High School
- Floyd Central High School (Indiana), Floyds Knobs
- Muncie Central High School
- Central High School & Boys Vocational School, South Bend

=== Iowa ===
- Central High School (De Witt, Iowa); see 2015–16 Northern Iowa Panthers women's basketball team
- Central Alternative High School, Dubuque Community School District
- Central Lee High School, Donnellson
- Central High School (Davenport, Iowa)
- Le Mars Central High School, now the Plymouth County Historical Museum
- Sioux City Central High School, Woodbury County

=== Kentucky ===
- Central High School (Louisville, Kentucky)

=== Louisiana ===
- Central High School (Catahoula Parish, Louisiana), Catahoula Parish
- Central High School (Central, Louisiana), Central
- Central High School (Shreveport, Louisiana), Caddo Parish

=== Maine ===
- Central High School (Corinth, Maine), a high school in Maine

=== Maryland ===
- Central High School (Maryland), Walker Mill

=== Massachusetts ===
- Springfield Central High School

=== Michigan ===
- Battle Creek Central High School
- Bay City Central High School
- Benzie Central High School, Benzonia
- Central High School (Detroit)
- Central High School (Grand Rapids, Michigan)
- Flint Central High School
- Forest Hills Central High School, Ada Township
- Kalamazoo Central High School
- Traverse City Central High School
- Walled Lake Central High School
- Portage Central High School

=== Minnesota ===
- Central High School (Duluth, Minnesota), St. Louis County
- Central High School (Minneapolis, Minnesota)
- Central High School (Norwood Young America, Minnesota), a high school in Minnesota
- Central High School (Saint Paul, Minnesota)
- Central High School (South St. Paul, Minnesota), the former name of South St. Paul Secondary

=== Mississippi ===
- Central High School (Jackson, Mississippi)

=== Missouri ===
- Central High School (Cape Girardeau, Missouri)
- Central High School (Kansas City, Missouri)
- Francis Howell Central High School, Cottleville
- Central High School (St. Joseph, Missouri)
- Central High School (Springfield, Missouri)
- Central VPA High School, St. Louis
- Hazelwood Central High School
- New Madrid County Central, Howardville

=== Montana ===
- Great Falls Central High School (disambiguation) (all in Montana)

=== Nebraska ===
- Omaha Central High School, Douglas County

=== New Hampshire ===
- Manchester Central High School

=== New Jersey ===
- Central High School (Newark, New Jersey)
- Central High School (Paterson, New Jersey)
- Central Regional High School, Berkeley Township
- Hopewell Valley Central High School, Hopewell Township
- Hunterdon Central Regional High School, Flemington

=== New Mexico ===
- Kirtland Central High School

=== New York ===
- Binghamton Central High School, merged into Binghamton High School
- Valley Stream Central High School

=== North Carolina ===
- Garinger High School (formerly Central High School), Charlotte
- High Point Central High School
- Rutherfordton-Spindale Central High School, Rutherford County

=== North Dakota ===
- Central High School (Devils Lake, North Dakota), Ramsey County
- Central High School (Fargo, North Dakota)
- Central High School (Grand Forks, North Dakota)

=== Ohio ===
- Central High School, now the site of National Inventors Hall of Fame STEM High School, Akron
- Central High School (Cleveland, Ohio)
- Central High School (Columbus, Ohio) (closed 1982), Franklin County
- Central High School (Dayton, Ohio), a former high school; see Charlotte Reeve Conover
- Central High School (Mingo Junction, Ohio), listed on the NRHP in Jefferson County, Ohio
- Westerville Central High School

=== Oklahoma ===
- Central High School (Central High, Oklahoma)
- Central High School (Oklahoma City, Oklahoma)
- Central High School (Tulsa, Oklahoma)

=== Oregon ===
- Central High School (Independence, Oregon)

=== Pennsylvania ===
- Central Bucks High School (disambiguation), three high schools in Bucks County, PA
- Central Catholic High School (Pittsburgh)
- Central High School (Martinsburg, Pennsylvania)
- Central High School (Philadelphia), second oldest continually operated public high school in the US
- Central Tech High School, Erie
- Columbia Central High School (Bloomsburg, Pennsylvania)
- Greensburg Central Catholic High School, in Greensburg

=== Rhode Island ===
- Central High School (Providence, Rhode Island)

=== South Carolina ===
- Central High School (Central, South Carolina)
- Central High School (Pageland, South Carolina)

=== South Dakota ===
- Central High School (Aberdeen, South Dakota)
- Central High School (Rapid City, South Dakota)

=== Tennessee ===
- Central High School (Bolivar, Tennessee), a high school in Tennessee
- Central High School (Camden, Tennessee), Camden, Tennessee
- McMinn Central High School, Englewood
- Central High School (Knoxville, Tennessee)
- Central High School (Memphis, Tennessee)
- Central High School (Nashville, Tennessee), now defunct, stood from 1921 to 1971
- Central High School (Wartburg, Tennessee), in Wartburg, Tennessee
- Central Magnet School (formerly Central High School), in Murfreesboro
- Chattanooga Central High School, Harrison
- Columbia Central High School (Columbia, Tennessee)

=== Texas ===
- Central High School (Beaumont, Texas), closed in 2018
- Central High School (Fort Worth, Texas)
- Central High School (Galveston, Texas), closed in 1968
- Central High School (Pollok, Texas)
- Central High School (San Angelo, Texas)

=== Virginia ===
- Central High School (Painter, Virginia), Accomack County
- Central High School (Woodstock, Virginia)
- Central High School (King and Queen Court House, Virginia), King and Queen County, Virginia
- Central High School (Victoria, Virginia), Victoria, Lunenburg County, Virginia
- Central High School (Wise, Virginia)

=== Washington ===
- Central Valley High School (Washington)

=== Wisconsin ===
- Walter Reuther Central High School, Kenosha
- Westosha Central High School, Paddock Lake
- La Crosse Central High School
- West Allis Central High School
- Madison Central High School (Wisconsin), Madison

=== Wyoming ===
- Cheyenne Central High School

== Elsewhere ==
- Armenian Evangelical Central High School, East Beirut, Lebanon
- Central High School (San Juan, Puerto Rico)
- St. Croix Central High School (Virgin Islands), St. Croix, U.S. Virgin Islands
- Central Etobicoke High School, Toronto, Ontario, Canada
- Ehime Prefectural Matsuyama Central Senior High School, Matsuyama, Ehime, Japan
- Yamagata Prefectural Yamagata Central High School, Yamagata, Yamagata, Japan; see 2014 Nippon Professional Baseball draft

== See also ==
- Central Catholic High School (disambiguation)
- Central High, Oklahoma
- Center High School (disambiguation)
- Central School (disambiguation)
- Central Middle School (disambiguation)
