= Pace, Florida =

- Unincorporated Area
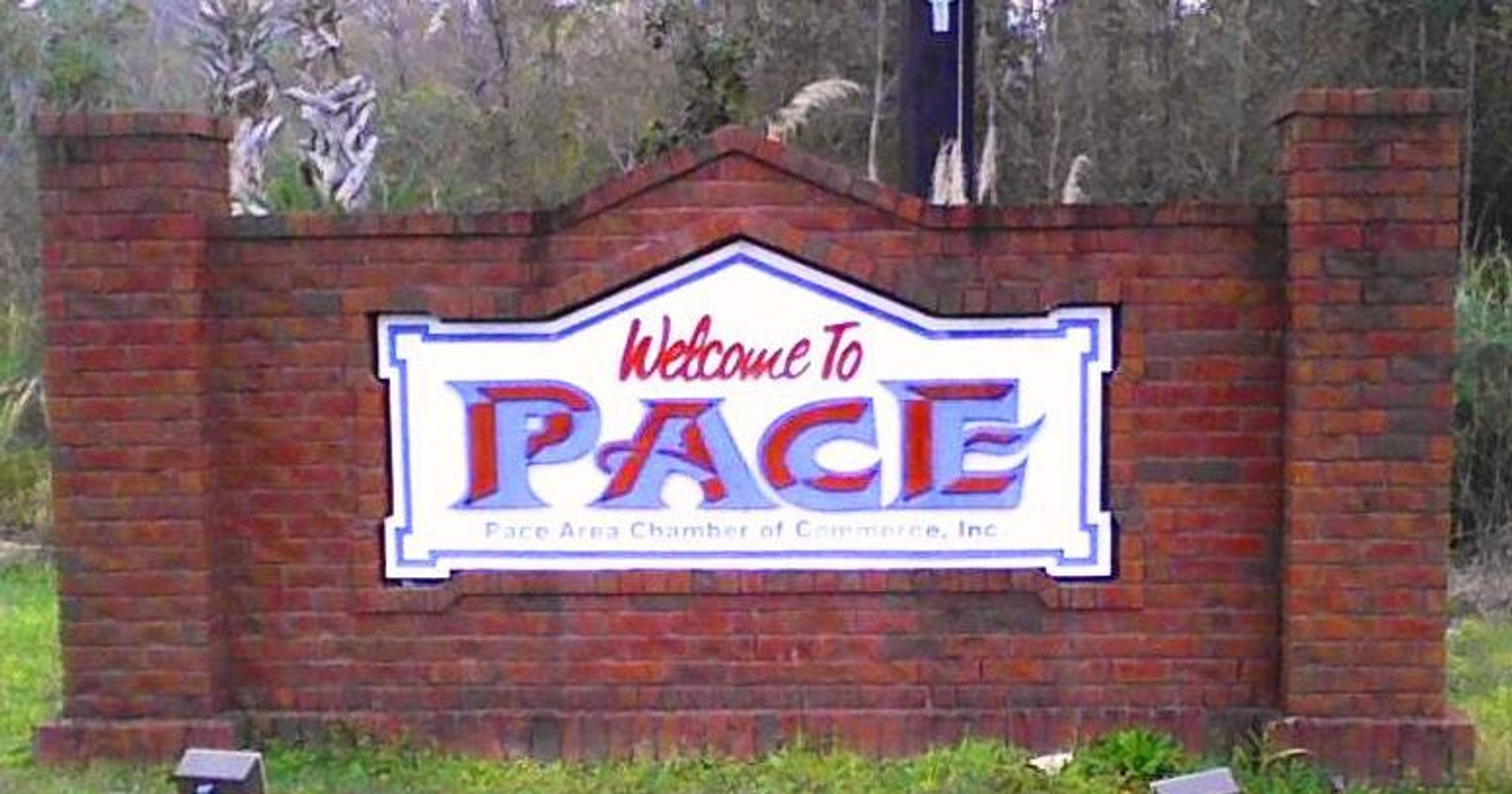
- Pace Welcome Sign

- Location in Santa Rosa County and the state of Florida
- Coordinates: 30°37′08″N 87°10′00″W
- Country: United States
- State: Florida
- County: Santa Rosa

Area
  - Total: 24.52 sq mi (63.50 km^{2})
  - Land: 24.23 sq mi (62.75 km^{2})
  - Water: 0.29 sq mi (0.75 km^{2})
- Elevation: 89 ft (27 m)

Population (2020)
  - Total: 24,684
  - Density: 1,018.8/sq mi (393.36/km^{2})
- Time zone: UTC-6 (Central (CST))
  - Summer (DST): UTC-5 (CDT)
- ZIP code: 32571
- Area code: 850
- FIPS code: 12-53725
- GNIS feature ID: 2403384

Pace is an unincorporated community in Santa Rosa County, Florida. It is the second largest community in Santa Rosa County, and is a part of the Pensacola Metropolitan Area. Pace has experienced exponential growth, and has evolved from a small, rural community to a thriving bedroom community of Pensacola with growing residential and commercial options. As of the 2020 United States census, the population was 24,684, up from 20,093 at the 2010 census. From 2000 to 2010, the Pace CDP population growth percentage was 171.1%, and from 2010 to 2020, the population growth percentage was 22.8%.

== Geography ==
Pace is located in the Western Florida Panhandle, just north of Escambia Bay in Santa Rosa County. Pace comprises the 32571 ZIP code, and is located northeast of Pensacola, and west of Milton. Pace is located approximately 25 minutes driving distance away from Downtown Pensacola. According to the United States Census Bureau, Pace has a total area of 9.4 square miles (24 km^{2}), all land.

== History ==
Pace was first recognized in the 1912 United States Census. It was located just north of Floridatown. Pace is named after James G. Pace, who owned large lumber, paper and turpentine productions that operated in the Pace area. On March 12, 1919, Black veteran Bud Johnson was lynched as part of the Red Summer of 1919. Throughout the 20th century, Pace remained a small, rural community. However, beginning in 1980, Pace began to experience rapid growth and began to evolve from a small, rural community to a fast-growing bedroom community of Pensacola. Floridatown and Pea Ridge are now considered to be neighborhoods within Pace. Pace continues to experience strong population growth, and the growth trend is expected to continue despite remaining an unincorporated community.

== Education ==
Schools in Pace are administered by the Santa Rosa County School District. Schools in the Pace area perform well, with all schools receiving an A or B rating according to the Florida Department of Education.

=== High schools ===
- Pace High School

=== Middle schools ===
- Avalon Middle School
- Thomas L. Sims Middle School
- Wallace K-8 School

=== Elementary schools ===
- Bennett C. Russell Elementary School
- Pea Ridge Elementary School
- S.S. Dixon Primary School
- S.S. Dixon Intermediate School
- Wallace K-8 School

== Demographics ==
Historical population
Census	Pop.	Note	%±
1970	1,776		—
1980	5,006		181.9%
1990	6,277		25.4%
2000	7,393		17.8%
2010	20,093		171.8%
2020	24,684		22.8%

=== 2020 census ===
As of the 2020 census, Pace had a population of 24,684. The median age was 39.3 years. Children under the age of 5 accounted for 6.5% of residents; 25.0% were under the age of 18, and 16.1% were 65 years of age or older. For every 100 females there were 95.7 males, and for every 100 females age 18 and over there were 92.3 males age 18 and over.

97.5% of residents lived in urban areas, while 2.5% lived in rural areas.

There were 8,998 households in Pace, of which 36.6% had children under the age of 18 living in them. Of all households, 58.9% were married-couple households, 13.0% were households with a male householder and no spouse or partner present, and 21.9% were households with a female householder and no spouse or partner present. About 18.5% of all households were made up of individuals and 8.8% had someone living alone who was 65 years of age or older.

There were 9,430 housing units, of which 4.6% were vacant. The homeowner vacancy rate was 1.1% and the rental vacancy rate was 6.7%.

Racial composition as of the 2020 census
Race	Number	Percent
White	20,565	83.3%
Black or African American	733	3.0%
American Indian and Alaska Native	168	0.7%
Asian	579	2.3%
Native Hawaiian and Other Pacific Islander	59	0.2%
Some other race	434	1.8%
Two or more races	2,146	8.7%
Hispanic or Latino (of any race)	1,349	5.5%
