= Central Junior High School =

Central Junior High School may refer to a number of middle schools:

- Central Junior High School, Belleville, Illinois, part of Belleville School District 118
- Central Junior High School, Camp Point, Illinois, part of Central Community Unit School District 3
- Central Junior High School, Cape Girardeau, Missouri, part of Cape Girardeau School District
- Central Junior High School, East Peoria, Illinois, part of East Peoria School District 86
- Central Junior High School, Euless, Texas, part of Hurst-Euless-Bedford Independent School District
- Central Junior High School, Evergreen Park, Illinois, part of Evergreen Park Elementary School District 124
- Central Junior High School, Guymon, Oklahoma, part of Guymon Public Schools
- Central Junior High School, Lawton, Oklahoma, part of Lawton Public Schools
- Central Junior High School, Moore, Oklahoma, part of Moore Public Schools
- Central Junior High School, Pollok, Texas, part of Central Independent School District
- Central Junior High School, Springdale, Arkansas, part of Springdale Public Schools
- Central Junior High School, West Frankfort, Illinois, part of Frankfort Community Unit School District 168
- Central Junior High School, Zion, Illinois, part of Zion Elementary School District 6
- A-C Central Junior High School, Chandlerville, Illinois, part of A-C Central Community Unit School District 262
- Buffalo Island Central Junior High School, Leachville, Arkansas, part of Buffalo Island Central School District
- Corydon Central Junior High School, Corydon, Indiana, part of South Harrison Community Schools
- Farmington Central Junior High School, Farmington, Illinois, part of Farmington Central Community Unit School District 265
- Lawrence Central Junior High School, Lawrence, Kansas, part of Lawrence Unified School District 497
- Pearl River Central Junior High School, Carriere, Mississippi, part of Pearl River County School District
- Warren Central Junior High School, Vicksburg, Mississippi, part of Vicksburg-Warren School District
- Weld Central Junior High School, Keenesburg, Colorado, part of Keenesburg School District Re-3 (J)
- Wilson Central Junior High School, West Lawn, Pennsylvania, part of Wilson School District

== See also ==
- Central High School (disambiguation)
- Central Middle School (disambiguation)
