= Milton High School (Florida) =

Location
- 5445 Stewart Street; Milton, Florida, 32570; United States

Information
- Type: Public
- Established: 1915
- School district: Santa Rosa County School District
- Superintendent: Dr. Karen Barber
- Dean: Derek Freeman, Savannah Cole
- Principal: Tim Short
- Teaching staff: 88.00 (FTE)
- Grades: 9–12
- Enrollment: 1,985 (2024-2025)
- Student to teacher ratio: 23.03
- Campus: Suburban
- Colors: Black and gold
- Athletics: Cheerleading, cross country, football, golf, swimming, volleyball, basketball, soccer, weightlifting, wrestling, baseball, lacrosse, softball, tennis, track & field
- Mascot: Panther
- Rival: Pace High School, Navarre High School
- Yearbook: Panther's Paw
- Feeder schools: Hobbs, M.L. King, Avalon
- Website: mhs.santarosaschools.org

Milton High School (MHS) is a public secondary school located in Milton, Florida. MHS was first established in 1915, making it the oldest school in Santa Rosa County. The original campus was built on Canal Street in Milton and held classes there, until it moved to its current location on Stewart Street in 1953. The original building is now the home to the Santa Rosa County School Board offices.

One of eight high schools in the county, nearly 2,000 students are enrolled at MHS, in grades nine through twelve. Milton has had several principals over its more than 100 years of existence: Don Lewis Lynn, Jr. was principal from 1999 to the 2006–07 school year, until taking an Assistant Superintendent position at the county level. Buddy Powell then served from 2008 to the 2014–2015 school year, Michael Thorpe taking over the position after. Most recently, Tim Short became the principal in April of 2015.

== History of Milton High School ==
Carved over the arched doorway of the large, two-story building at 5086 Canal Street is the Latin phrase, "Sit Lux," which means "let the light shine." This building, now the Santa Rosa County School Board Office, was Milton High School from 1915 to 1953.

On November 1, 1915, this first state-accredited high school in Santa Rosa County opened its doors for students. It was organized and financed under the leadership of County Supt John T. Diamond of Jay. Professor A.D. Keen, a graduate of Emory University, administered the school program along with a self-trained faculty. This institution was known as the Santa Rosa County High School, as it was then the county's only high school. As other communities in the county soon added grades or built new high schools, the school in Milton became known as Milton High School.

By 1917, eighty seniors were ready to graduate from Santa Rosa County's first high school. The 1917 issue of the school yearbook The Phoenix pictures fourteen faculty members, fourteen freshmen, seven sophomores, the girls' basketball team, and the eleven-man baseball team. The baseball team was coached by Smiley L. Porter.

== Notable alumni ==
- Greg Allen, former NFL running back
- Randy Allen, former professional basketball player
- Paul S. Amos, founder and chairman of Aflac
- Cortland Finnegan, former NFL cornerback for the Tennessee Titans (2006–2011), St. Louis Rams (2012–2013), Miami Dolphins (2014), and Carolina Panthers (2015)
- Bolley Johnson, former Speaker of the Florida House of Representatives
- Reggie Slack, former college quarterback at Auburn University and NFL/CFL quarterback for the Houston Oilers (1990–1992), New York/New Jersey Knights (1992), Toronto Argonauts (1993–1994), Hamilton Tiger-Cats (1994), Birmingham Barracudas (1995), Winnipeg Blue Bombers (1995–1996), and the Saskatchewan Roughriders (1997–1999)
- Heath Slocum, PGA Tour golfer
- Lawrence Tynes, former NFL placekicker for the New York Giants, 2× Super Bowl Champion (2007, 2011)
- Rod Walker, former NFL defensive tackle for the Green Bay Packers (2001–2003)
- Bubba Watson, PGA Tour golfer
- Boo Weekley, PGA Tour golfer
- Elijah Williams, NFL, Atlanta Falcons

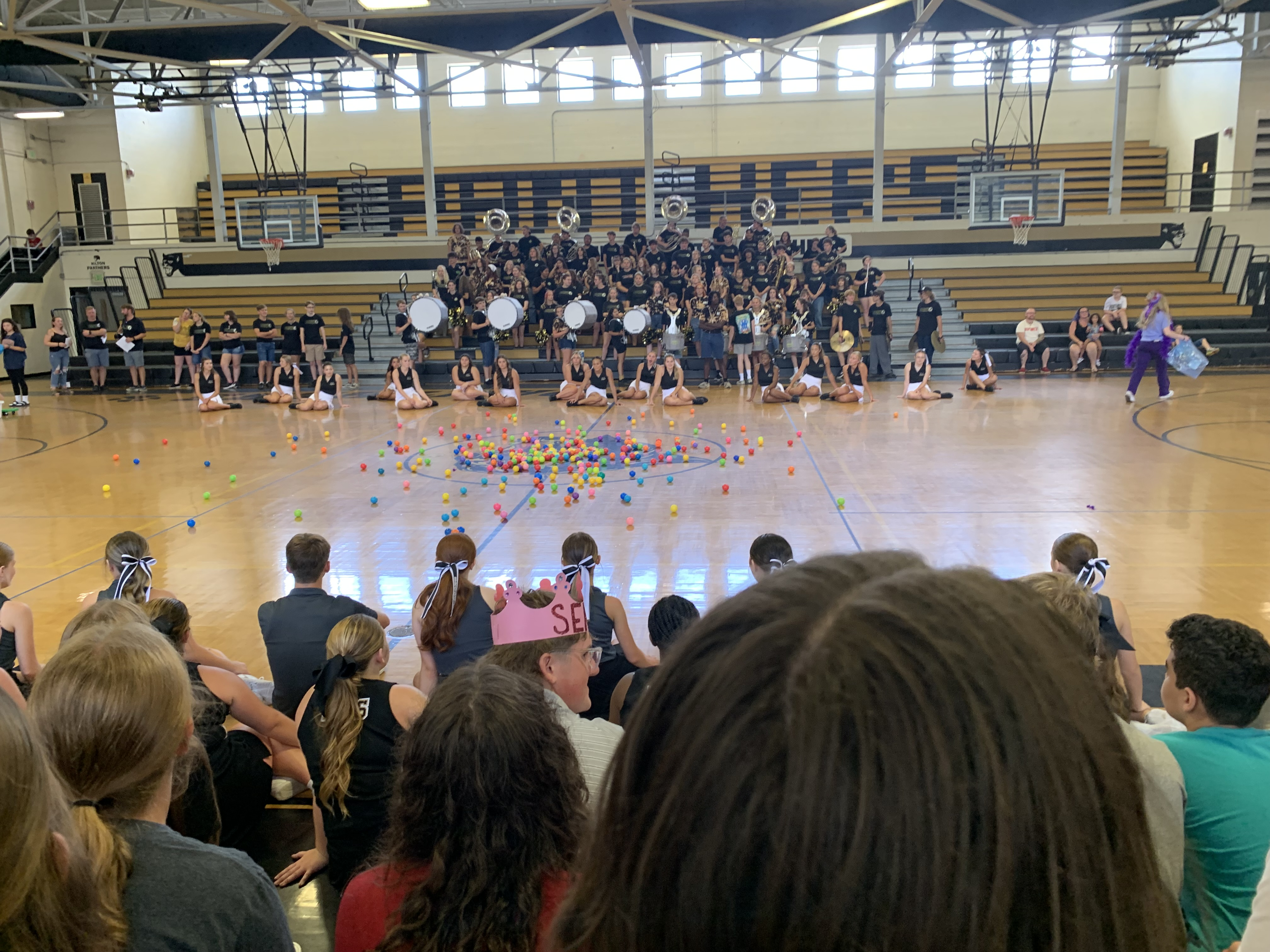
A pep rally at Milton High School.
