= Gwendolyn Oxenham =

American writer, filmmaker, and soccer player

- Born: Gwendolyn Anne Oxenham; November 24, 1983 (age 42); West Covina, California, U.S.
- Education: Duke University (BA); University of Notre Dame (MFA)
- Occupations: Writer; Filmmaker; Soccer player; Professor
- Notable work: Pelada; An Equal Playing Field
- Spouse: Luke Boughen
Soccer career
- Height: 5 ft 6 in (1.68 m)
- Position: Forward
Youth career
- –1999: Gulf Breeze Dolphins
- Pensacola Samba
College career
Years	Team	Apps	(Gls)
2000–2003	Duke Blue Devils	80	(10)
Senior career*
Years	Team	Apps	(Gls)
2005	Santos		
- * Club domestic league appearances and goals
- Website: gwendolynoxenham.com

Gwendolyn Anne Oxenham (born November 24, 1983) is an American writer, filmmaker, and retired soccer player. She studied English and documentary filmmaking at Duke University, where as a soccer player she was the youngest NCAA Division I athlete in history. She later studied creative writing at the University of Notre Dame, where she was awarded a prestigious postgraduate writing grant. During a summer break there, she played professionally for the Brazilian soccer club Santos.

Oxenham has written, directed, and performed in a number of soccer-oriented documentaries, most notably the 2010 film Pelada. She has written two books and contributed many articles to prominent U.S. periodicals.

== Early life and education ==
Gwendolyn Oxenham was born in West Covina, California, but grew up in Gulf Breeze, Florida, near Pensacola. She graduated after her junior year at Gulf Breeze High School, having been named Northwest Florida soccer player of the year. She was awarded an athletic scholarship to Duke University, and in her first year there was a starter and top scorer on the women's soccer team. At 16 years old, she was at that time the youngest NCAA Division I athlete in history. In four seasons for Duke, she scored 10 goals and recorded 17 assists in 80 appearances.

Graduating four years later with a BA in English and a certificate from Duke's Center for Documentary Studies, she enrolled in the MFA in Creative Writing program at the University of Notre Dame. During the break after her first year there in 2005, she played professionally for the women's team of Santos, the premier Brazilian soccer club. Back at Notre Dame she received the Nicholas Sparks Prize, a year-long postgraduate writing grant.

== Filmmaking ==
Upon finishing her grant year, Oxenham and three friends decided to make a documentary film about pickup soccer games around the world. The crew took three trips, encompassing 25 countries, to shoot the film. One trip, in 2007, was to South America; another, in 2008, was to Europe and Africa; the third, in 2009, was to Asia and the Middle East.

The resulting film, Pelada, premiered in 2010 at SXSW. It was distributed internationally and shown at festivals in the U.S., where it won numerous awards. Its New York City premiere was at a bar in Manhattan's Koreatown; it received positive reviews in The New York Times and The New Yorker.

Oxenham wrote and directed, with Erit Yellen and Rebekah Fergusson, the 2015 sports documentary An Equal Playing Field. She was consulting producer for Finding Football, a 2018 original series produced for YouTube.

== Writing ==
Gwendolyn Oxenham is the author of two books and numerous articles and essays.

- Finding the Game: Three Years, Twenty-five Countries and the Search for Pickup Soccer follows and expands upon the adventures chronicled in Pelada. It includes many details and stories that could not be fit into the 90-minute film.
- Under the Lights and in the Dark: Untold Stories of Women's Soccer, tells twelve stories about female soccer players around the world, including U.S. professional star Allie Long, who trains in an underground men's league in New York City, and Danish international star Nadia Nadim, who honed her skills after her family fled from the Taliban.

She has contributed articles to many publications, including The Atlantic, Sports Illustrated, and The New York Times.

== Personal life ==
Oxenham married Luke Boughen, co-star of Pelada. She lives in Southern California, where she teaches English and screenwriting at Orange Coast College and Laguna College of Art and Design.
