= Randy Allen (basketball) =

American basketball player

Personal information
- Born: January 26, 1965 (age 61) Milton, Florida, U.S.
- Listed height: 6 ft 8 in (2.03 m)
- Listed weight: 220 lb (100 kg)

Career information
- High school: Milton (Milton, Florida)
- College: Florida State (1983–1987)
- NBA draft: 1987: undrafted
- Playing career: 1987–1996
- Position: Small forward
- Number: 33

Career history
- 1987: Tampa Bay Stars
- 1987–1988: Imbelco
- 1988–1989: Cedar Rapids Silver Bullets
- 1989–1990: Sacramento Kings
- 1990–1991: Fulgor Libertas Forlì
- 1991: Albany Patroons
- 1991–1992: CB Breogán
- 1992–1993: Cholet Basket
- 1993–1994: CB Girona
- 1994: Pallacanestro Pavia
- 1995: Harrisburg Hammerheads
- 1995: Omaha Racers
- 1996: CB Peñas Huesca

Career highlights
- CBA Newcomer of the Year (1988)
- Stats at NBA.com
- Stats at Basketball Reference

James Randall "Randy" Allen (born January 26, 1965) is an American former professional basketball player.

A 6 ft 8 in (2.03 m) forward from Florida State University, Allen was never drafted by an NBA team but did manage to play two years in the league from 1988 to 1990 with the Sacramento Kings. On October 1, 1990, Allen signed a two-year deal with the Denver Nuggets, but was released after the hiring of head coach Paul Westhead. He was then signed by the Chicago Bulls on October 7, 1993, but was placed on waivers 10 days after signing. In his NBA career, Allen played in 70 games and scored a total of 252 points. Randy has two sons, Adam Allen and Brandon Allen. Adam played basketball and baseball for the University of Florida. Brandon Allen played professional baseball in the San Francisco Giants organization before joining the Florida State Seminoles men's basketball team.

== Career statistics ==
Legend
GP	Games played	GS	Games started	MPG	Minutes per game
FG%	Field goal percentage	3P%	3-point field goal percentage	FT%	Free throw percentage
RPG	Rebounds per game	APG	Assists per game	SPG	Steals per game
BPG	Blocks per game	PPG	Points per game	**Bold**	Career high

=== NBA ===
==== Regular season ====
Year	Team	GP	GS	MPG	FG%	3P%	FT%	RPG	APG	SPG	BPG	PPG
1988–89	Sacramento	7	0	6.1	.421	.000	.500	1.0	.0	.1	.1	2.4
1989–90	Sacramento	**63**	**6**	**11.8**	**.444**	.000	**.535**	**2.2**	**.4**	**.3**	**.3**	**3.7**
Career		70	6	11.3	.442	.000	.533	2.1	.3	.2	.3	3.6
