= Jordan Jefferson (defensive lineman) =

American football player (born 2001)

No. 98 – Miami Dolphins
- Position: Defensive tackle
- Roster status: Active

Personal information
- Born: September 24, 2001 (age 25); Navarre, Florida, U.S.
- Listed height: 6 ft 4 in (1.93 m)
- Listed weight: 317 lb (144 kg)

Career information
- High school: Navarre
- College: West Virginia (2019–2022); LSU (2023)
- NFL draft: 2024: 4th round, 116th overall pick

Career history
- Jacksonville Jaguars (2024); San Francisco 49ers (2025); Cincinnati Bengals (2025); Los Angeles Chargers (2026)*; Miami Dolphins (2026–present)
- * Offseason or practice squad member only

Career NFL statistics as of 2025
- Total tackles: 12
- Sacks: 1.0
- Pass deflections: 1
- Stats at Pro Football Reference

Jordan Jefferson (born September 24, 2001) is an American professional football defensive tackle for the Miami Dolphins of the National Football League (NFL). He played college football for the West Virginia Mountaineers and LSU Tigers before being selected by the Jacksonville Jaguars in the fourth round of the 2024 NFL draft.

== Early life ==
From Navarre, Florida, Jefferson attended Navarre High School where he was a football player and wrestler. He was a first-team all-area choice after totaling 60 tackles, 22 tackles-for-loss (TFLs) and five sacks as a senior in 2018; he also was named to the Florida Athletic Coaches Association All-Star Game and concluded his tenure at Navarre with 115 tackles, 35 TFLs and 11 sacks. Ranked a three-star recruit, he committed to play college football for the West Virginia Mountaineers.

== College career ==
As a true freshman at West Virginia in 2019, Jefferson appeared in 11 games, one as a starter, and posted five tackles. His playing time declined and he recorded only one tackle in the 2020 season. He saw more playing time in 2021, totaling 17 tackles and four TFLs. Jefferson was named to The Athletic's "Freak List" entering the 2022 season. That year, he was a full-time starter and had 31 tackles, 9.5 TFLs, five pass breakups and three sacks.

Jefferson entered the NCAA transfer portal following the 2022 season. He ultimately transferred to the LSU Tigers. In his only year with the Tigers, he totaled 36 tackles, seven TFLs and 2.5 sacks. He was invited to participate at the 2024 Senior Bowl and NFL Scouting Combine.

== Professional career ==
Pre-draft measurables
Height	Weight	Arm length	Hand span	Wingspan	40-yard dash	10-yard split	20-yard split	Vertical jump	Broad jump	Bench press
6 ft 2 3/4 in (1.90 m)	313 lb (142 kg)	33 1/8 in (0.84 m)	9 7/8 in (0.25 m)	6 ft 7 1/4 in (2.01 m)	5.10 s	1.78 s	2.94 s	31.0 in (0.79 m)	8 ft 8 in (2.64 m)	34 reps
All values from NFL Combine/Pro Day

=== Jacksonville Jaguars ===
Jefferson was selected in the fourth round (116th overall) of the 2024 NFL draft by the Jacksonville Jaguars.

On August 26, 2025, Jefferson was waived by the Jaguars as part of final roster cuts.

=== San Francisco 49ers ===
On August 27, 2025, Jefferson was claimed off waivers by the San Francisco 49ers. He was waived on October 2.

=== Cincinnati Bengals ===
On October 3, 2025, Jefferson was claimed off waivers by the Cincinnati Bengals.

On August 30, 2026, Jefferson was waived by the Bengals as a part of final roster cuts.

=== Los Angeles Chargers ===
On September 2, 2026, Jefferson was signed to the Los Angeles Chargers' practice squad. On October 6, he was released by Los Angeles.

=== Miami Dolphins ===
On October 13, 2026, Jefferson signed with the Miami Dolphins practice squad. On November 17, he was signed to the active roster.
