= Center High School =

Center High School may refer to:

- Center High School (California), Antelope, California
- Center High School, Center, Colorado
- Center High School (Missouri), Kansas City, Missouri
- Center High School, closed and merged school replaced by Central Valley High School, Monaca, Pennsylvania
- Center High School (Texas), Center, Texas

== See also ==
- Centre High School, located in Lost Springs, Kansas
- Central High School (disambiguation)
