= Navarre High School =

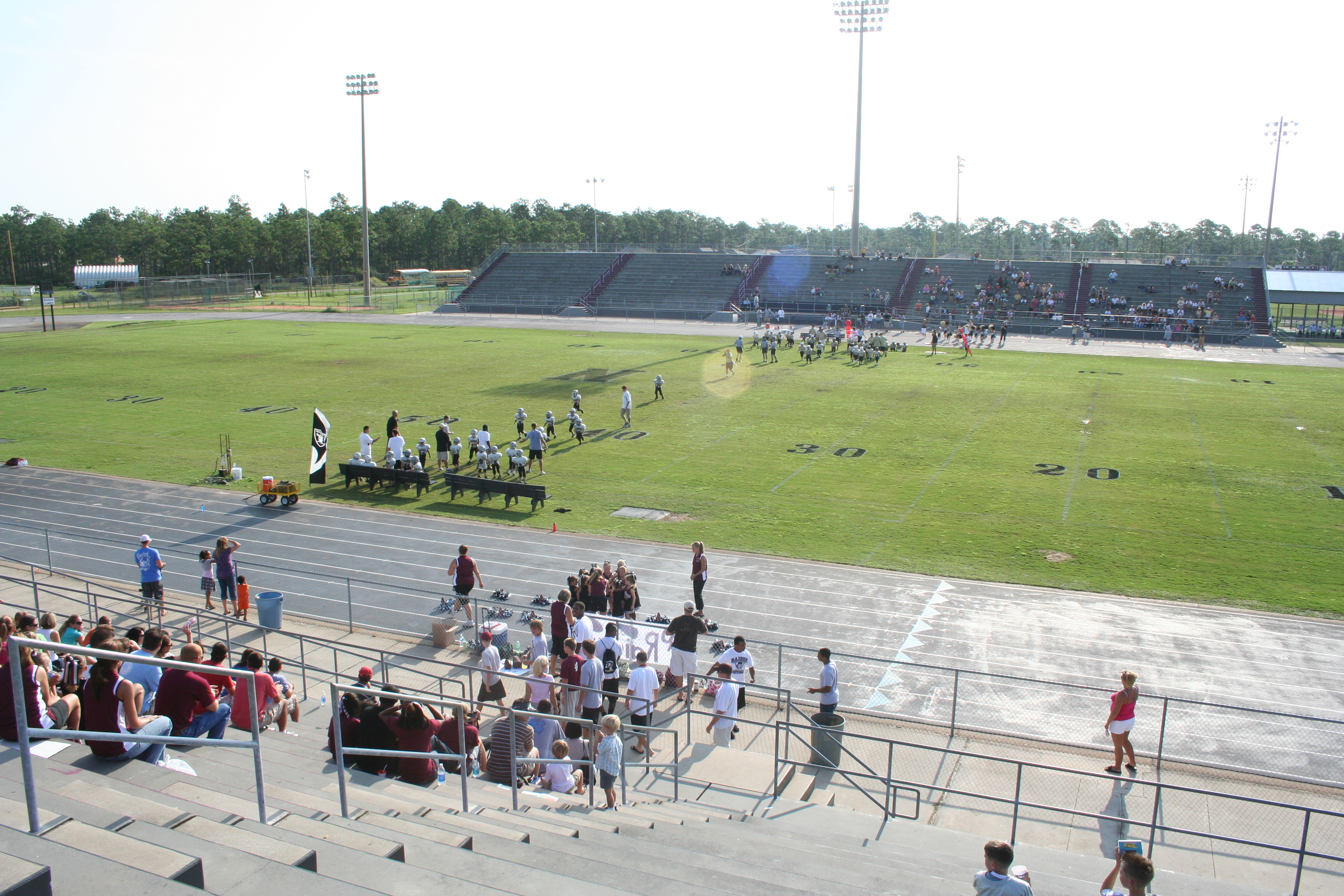
- Bennett Russell Stadium at Navarre High School

Location
- 8600 High School Boulevard; Navarre, Florida 32566; United States; 30.4237°N 86.8618°W

Information
- Type: Public high school
- Established: 1996
- School district: Santa Rosa County District Schools
- Superintendent: Karen Barber
- Principal: Kasie Windfelder
- Teaching staff: 92.00 (FTE)
- Grades: 9–12
- Enrollment: 2,410 (2024-2025)
- Student to teacher ratio: 26.61
- Colors: Black, maroon, and white
- Mascot: Raider
- Rival: Gulf Breeze High School, Milton High School
- Feeder schools: Holley-Navarre Middle School, Woodlawn Beach Middle School, and East Bay K-8
- Website: https://nhs.santarosaschools.org/

Navarre High School is a public secondary school located in Navarre, Florida. Established in 1996, it is the most populous high school in Santa Rosa County, with an estimated number of 2,309 students enrolled.

== Campus ==
Navarre High School has a suburban-style campus.

== Academics ==
Navarre High School offers just over one hundred courses: twenty-three fine art courses, seventeen math courses, seventeen science courses, thirteen social studies courses, thirteen business courses, twelve English courses, ten foreign language courses, six physical education courses, five general courses, NJROTC, and two DCT (Diversified Career Technology) courses. This includes thirty-four AP (Advanced Placement) courses.

== Breakdown ==
Principal

1

Vice Principals

4

Dean

2

Guidance Counselors

5

Media Specialist

1

Teachers

122

Support Staff

21

Navarre High School's statistics:

- Male/Female - 51%/49%
- White: 81.4% - Black: 6.5% - Hispanic: 4.7% - Multiracial: 10.2% - Asian: 2.6% - Native American: 0.6%
- Graduation Rate: 91.3%
- FCAT passing scores: 94%

== Athletics ==
Navarre High School has a wide range of sports and athletic facilities, including 21 varsity sports, 12 junior varsity sports and more than 20 clubs and activity groups. The school mascot is 'The Raider'.

- The football team has won six district championships and two regional championships .
- Girls Weightlifting has won six state titles: 2009, 2013, 2015, 2016, 2017 and 2018.
- Boys Weightlifting has one title: 2019.

== NJROTC ==
Navarre High School provides the Navy Junior Reserved Officer Training Corps program, which is funded by the U.S. Navy. The curriculum is Naval Science I-IV. The Battalion has qualified and participated in NJROTC Nationals in 2010, 2022, 2023, and 2024.

== Notable alumni ==
- Michael Carter, NFL running back for the Arizona Cardinals
- Jordan Jefferson, college football defensive tackle for the LSU Tigers
- Jordan Leggett, former NFL tight end
- Jeff Van Camp, former quarterback for the Florida Atlantic Owls
- Emily Sams, current NWSL player for the Orlando Pride
