= Central Elementary School =

Central Elementary School may refer to:

In Canada

- Central Elementary School (Port Coquitlam, British Columbia)

In the United States

(by state)

- Central Elementary School (Magnolia, Arkansas)
- Central Elementary School, Simsbury, Connecticut, included in Horace Belden School and Central Grammar School NRHP listing
- Central Elementary School (Seaford, Delaware)
- Central Elementary School (Lake Bluff, Illinois)
- Central Elementary School (Wilmette, Illinois)
- Central Elementary School (Dodge City, Kansas)
- Central Elementary School (Olathe, Kansas)
- Central Elementary School (Paintsville, Kentucky)
- Central Elementary School (Edgewater, Maryland)
- Central Elementary School (Albemarle, North Carolina), former building listed on the NRHP in Stanly County, North Carolina
- Central Elementary School (Eden, North Carolina)
- Central Elementary School (New Bern, North Carolina), listed on the NRHP in Craven County, North Carolina
- Central Elementary School (Allison Park, Pennsylvania)
- Central Elementary School (Union City, Tennessee), listed on the NRHP in Obion County, Tennessee
- Central Elementary School (Belmont, California)
- Central Elementary School (Pleasant Grove, Utah)
