= Pea Ridge, Florida =

Pea Ridge is a community in Santa Rosa County, Florida, United States, located along U.S. Highway 90, east of Pace. It was designated a Census-designated place (CDP) by the Census Bureau by the 2010 census. The CDP had a total area of 2.82 square miles (7.3 km^{2}), with a population of 3,787 at the 2020 census. It is part of the Pensacola—Ferry Pass—Brent, Florida Metropolitan Statistical Area.

Pea Ridge is located at 30°35′46″N 87°07′14″W, at an elevation of 148 feet (45 m).

== Demographics ==
Pea Ridge first appeared as a census designated place in the 2010 U.S. census.

=== 2020 census ===
As of the 2020 census, Pea Ridge had a population of 3,787. The median age was 37.1 years. 27.0% of residents were under the age of 18 and 15.5% of residents were 65 years of age or older. For every 100 females there were 93.8 males, and for every 100 females age 18 and over there were 92.9 males age 18 and over.

98.9% of residents lived in urban areas, while 1.1% lived in rural areas.

There were 1,397 households in Pea Ridge, of which 33.4% had children under the age of 18 living in them. Of all households, 44.5% were married-couple households, 16.9% were households with a male householder and no spouse or partner present, and 32.0% were households with a female householder and no spouse or partner present. About 23.3% of all households were made up of individuals and 9.8% had someone living alone who was 65 years of age or older.

There were 1,488 housing units, of which 6.1% were vacant. The homeowner vacancy rate was 1.6% and the rental vacancy rate was 1.7%.

Racial composition as of the 2020 census
Race	Number	Percent
White	3,047	80.5%
Black or African American	220	5.8%
American Indian and Alaska Native	28	0.7%
Asian	69	1.8%
Native Hawaiian and Other Pacific Islander	3	0.1%
Some other race	77	2.0%
Two or more races	343	9.1%
Hispanic or Latino (of any race)	251	6.6%

=== 2010 census ===
As of the 2010 census, the population was 3,587.

== Notes ==
4. ^ https://srpressgazette.com/

Press Gazette, 2002-05-29, pg. 10.
