= Floridatown, Florida =

- Unincorporated community
- Location within Florida Location within the United States
- Coordinates: 30°34′58″N 87°09′41″W
- Country: United States
- State: Florida
- County: Santa Rosa

Area
  - Total: 0.403 sq mi (1.04 km^{2})
  - Land: 0.399 sq mi (1.03 km^{2})
  - Water: 0.004 sq mi (0.010 km^{2})
- Elevation: 16 ft (4.9 m)

Population (2020)
  - Total: 319
  - Density: 799/sq mi (309/km^{2})
- Time zone: UTC-6 (Central (CST))
  - Summer (DST): UTC-5 (CDT)
- ZIP code: 32571
- Area code: 850
- GNIS feature ID: 2629314

Floridatown is a census-designated place located in Santa Rosa County, Florida. It is now considered to be a neighborhood within Pace. The population was 319 at the 2020 census, up from 244 at the 2010 census. It is part of the Pensacola—Ferry Pass—Brent, Florida Metropolitan Statistical Area.

== History ==
Floridatown was originally settled by the Pensacola people.

== Geography ==
The neighborhood is bordered by Escambia Bay to the south, U.S. Route 90 in Florida to the north. Its eastern border is Air Products Road, and its Western Border is the Barnett Mill Creek.

According to the U.S. Census Bureau, the community has an area of 0.403 square miles (1.04 km^{2}); 0.399 square miles (1.03 km^{2}) of its area is land, and 0.004 square miles (0.010 km^{2}) is water.

== Demographics ==
Floridatown first appeared as a census designated place in the 2010 U.S. census formed from part of Pace CDP.
