= Gulf Breeze High School =

Public school in Florida, United States

Coordinates: 30.357824°N 87.167663°W

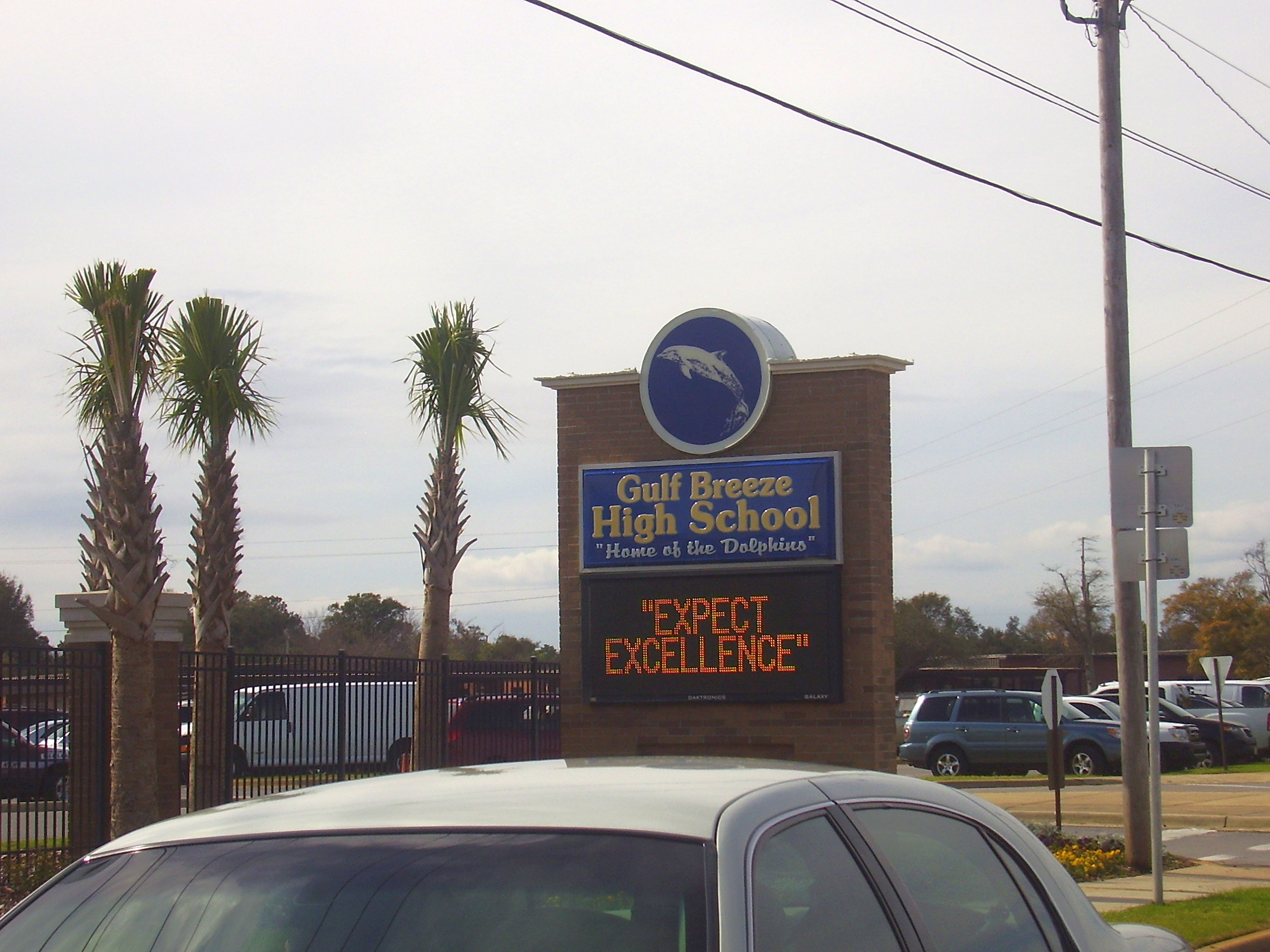

Location
- 675 Gulf Breeze Parkway; Gulf Breeze, Florida 32561; United States

Information
- Type: Secondary school
- Established: 1971
- School district: Santa Rosa County School District
- Principal: Sarah Barker
- Teaching staff: 78.17 (FTE)
- Grades: 9 to 12
- Enrollment: 1,946 (2024-2025)
- Student to teacher ratio: 25.29
- Colors: Navy and old gold
- Mascot: Dolphin
- Rival: Navarre High School
- Accreditation: Florida Department of Education
- Website: Gulf Breeze High School

Gulf Breeze High School is a public secondary school located in Gulf Breeze, Florida. It is one of eight high schools of the Santa Rosa County School District and the only high school in the city of Gulf Breeze.

For 2020, U.S. News & World Report ranked Gulf Breeze High #1 (out of 29) in Pensacola, FL Metro Area High Schools and #112 (out of 1,088) in Florida High Schools.

== History ==
It opened in 1971. It had 600 students in 1971, about 1,300 circa 1999, and 1,410 in 2000. Currently, it has a little over 2,000 students attending in the 2024-2025 school year.

== Facility ==
The school is contained within five structures and encompasses both sides of U.S. Route 98. In addition to a large main entrance building, Gulf Breeze High consists of an Art and Drama Department building, a Foreign Language Department building, an ESE building, and a Band and Music Department building.

Additional adjacent facilities include six tennis courts, basketball courts, a baseball complex, three practice fields for soccer, football and lacrosse, and a large stadium. On August 4, 2010, a $1.5 million field house addition was completed. In 2014, new baseball and softball field houses were completed, in 2015 the baseball complex received a face lift so all buildings would match and be aesthetically pleasing and coordinate in color; the spectator stands were covered for sun protection and in 2016 a new softball indoor batting facility was completed.

Adjacent to the high school are Gulf Breeze Elementary School and Gulf Breeze Middle School, creating a large educational campus in the heart of the small Gulf Breeze peninsula. The high quality of all three schools and the geographically limited land mass of Gulf Breeze are often credited in combination for bolstering property values on the peninsula.

== Communities served ==
Most high school-aged children in Pensacola Beach in Escambia County attend Gulf Breeze High, even though they are zoned to Escambia County School District's Pensacola High School.

== Student body ==
As of 2017, 85% are White, non-Hispanic, 6% are Hispanic, 5% are Asian/Pacific Islander, 3% are Native American/Alaskan Native, and less than 1% are Black, non-Hispanic.

In 2016, 21.4% of GBHS students were eligible for free or reduced lunch programs.

In 2016, 64.7% of GBHS teachers held a bachelor's degree, 33.8% held a master's degree, and 1.5% held a Doctorate.

== Sports ==
- Tennis
- Football
- Baseball
- Basketball
- Cheerleading
- Cross Country
- Dance
- Lacrosse
- Band
- Theatre
- Soccer
- Swimming
- Girls' volleyball
- Dive Team
- Track and Field
- Girls' Flag Football
- Beach Volleyball
- Golf
- Wrestling
- Girls' Wrestling

== Extracurricular activities ==
The school offers various clubs pertaining to a variety of interests. Each year GBHS hosts 'Club Rush' - an event located in the school's media center that allows incoming freshman and sophomore students to learn more about the current clubs available.

== Grade-change scandal ==
An investigation in 2019 revealed that former Gulf Breeze High School Assistant Principal Tori Baker changed her daughter's grades for three periods during the 2018-2019 school year, improving her class ranking from seventh to second. Following the Santa Rosa County School District Superintendent's recommendation that she be fired, Baker resigned.

The investigation also found that Principal Danny Brothers allegedly knew the student had requested the grades be changed and failed to prevent a conflict of interest between the assistant principal and her daughter.

== Notable alumni ==
=== Politics, law, and military ===
- Steve Mulroy, University of Memphis law professor, former Shelby County, Tennessee County commissioner

=== Sports ===
- Ben Lively, professional MLB pitcher, class of 2010
- Doug Baldwin, former professional NFL wide receiver, class of 2007
- Doug Hudson, former NFL quarterback, class of 1983
- Jason McKie, former professional football fullback, class of 1998
- Keith Savage, former professional soccer player, class of 2003

=== Music, media, and art ===
- Abigail Spencer, actress, class of 1999
- Ashley Brown, actress, class of 2000
- Candace Bailey, actress, class of 2001
- Claire Lautier, actress, class of 1988
- Gwendolyn Oxenham, writer, film producer, former soccer player, class of 1999

== Movie Notes ==
Misc: Parts of the film Jaws 2 were filmed at the Holiday Inn at Navarre Beach (later destroyed by a hurricane) and John Henley, the band director and many of the bands students are shown in the opening scene at the Holiday Inn Navarre by the pool. Mr. Henley is directing the Gulf Breeze High School band and can be seen right as Sheriff Brody (Roy Scheider) pulls up and goes up the stairs into the "Holidome" with the band playing for the "ribbon cutting scene."
