= Central School (Canton, Iowa) =

- U.S. National Register of Historic Places
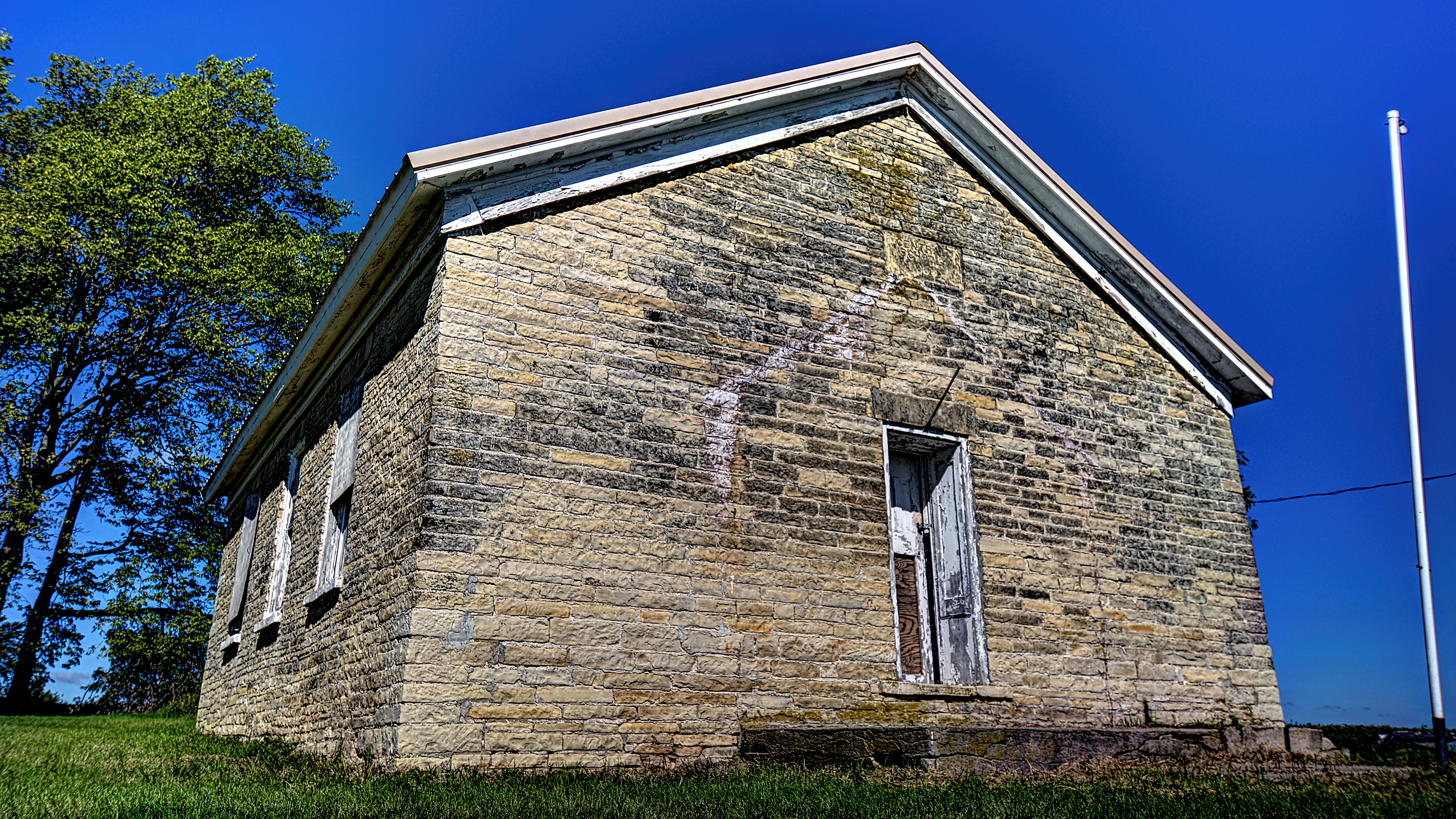

- Location within Iowa Location within the United States
- Location: Junction of Bellevue-Canton and Dubuque-Canton Rds., Canton, Iowa
- Coordinates: 42°10′25″N 90°51′15″W
- Area: less than one acre
- Built: 1868
- Architectural style: Vernacular
- MPS: Limestone Architecture of Jackson County MPS
- NRHP reference No.: 92000920
- Added to NRHP: July 24, 1992

Central School, also known as Hickory Grove School, is a historic one-room schoolhouse located northeast of Canton, Iowa, United States. It is one of over 217 limestone structures in Jackson County from the mid-19th century, of which 12 are school buildings. This school building was built in 1868, possibly by G.W. Kelsall or Issac Wilmer McCullogh, who were local stonemasons. The stone blocks that were used in the construction of this rectangular structure vary somewhat in shape and size, and they were laid in courses. What is unusual about the stone used here is that they are long and narrow, compared to the other buildings. The stones used at the corners are somewhat larger. The window sills and lintels are dressed stone. The stone used for this building was quarried about a mile north of here. A name and date stone are located on the east gable, above the door. The building was listed on the National Register of Historic Places in 1992.
