= Pace High School (Florida) =

Location
- 4065 Norris Road; Pace, Florida 32571; United States; 30.6133°N 87.1525°W

Information
- Type: Public
- Established: 1972
- School district: Santa Rosa County School District
- School number: 0182
- Principal: Stephen Shell
- Teaching staff: 91.50 (FTE)
- Enrollment: 2,316 (2024-2025)
- Student to teacher ratio: 24.96
- Colors: Red, white and blue
- Sports: Baseball, football, soccer, tennis, cross country, basketball, track, volleyball softball, golf, swimming, wrestling weightlifting
- Mascot: The Patriot
- Team name: Patriots
- Yearbook: The Liberator
- Website: phs.santarosaschools.org

Pace High School is a public high school located in Pace, in Santa Rosa County, Florida, United States. It was established in 1972 with 240 students, now accommodating over 2,300 students. Pace High School belongs to the Santa Rosa County School District.

== Notable alumni ==
- Thad Busby, a former Florida State University quarterback
- Bobby Cassevah, a former pitcher with the Los Angeles Angels of Anaheim
- Josh Donaldson, MLB third baseman for the New York Yankees
- Addison Russell, an American professional baseball shortstop who plays for the Acereros de Monclova of the Mexican League
- Ryan Santoso, an American football placekicker
- Brandon Sproat, MLB pitcher for the New York Mets organization

== Extracurricular activities ==
The school's NJROTC program won the 2019 national Most Outstanding Unit Award.

== Academics ==
Pace High School is involved in school-based decision making and has utilized teacher committees to determine and implement decisions that affect the overall school program.

== ACLU lawsuit ==
Pace High School was the subject of a religious freedom lawsuit from the ACLU in 2008.
