= Central High School (Camp Point, Illinois) =

High school in Camp Point, Illinois, USA

Location
- 2110 Highway 94 North; Camp Point, (Adams County), Illinois 62320; United States

Information
- Type: Public high school
- School district: Central Community Unit School District 3
- Principal: Zak Huston
- Staff: 19.89 (FTE)
- Enrollment: 233 (2023-2024)
- Student to teacher ratio: 11.71
- Colors: Black and Vegas gold
- Nickname: Panthers
- Website: cusd3.com/central-high-school/

Camp Point Central High School is a public high school in Camp Point, Illinois, United States, and is the high school of Central Community Unit School District 3. As of 2015, the school had 280 students in grades 9-12.

== Location ==
Central High School is located at 2110 North Illinois Route 94, Camp Point, Illinois, 62320. The campus is four miles northeast of Camp Point. The geographic coordinates are: 40.06495°N 91.0292°W.

== Athletics ==
Central High School competes in the West Central Conference. Its mascot is a Panther, with school colors of black and gold. The Boys Golf team placed 3rd in Illinois state championship competition in 2005–2006, but has no overall team championships on record in athletics or activities. Central coops with nearby Southeastern High School for some athletics.

== Notable alumni ==
- Paul Reuschel, Former MLB player (Chicago Cubs, Cleveland Indians)
- Rick Reuschel, Former MLB player (Chicago Cubs, New York Yankees, Pittsburgh Pirates, San Francisco Giants)
- Alison Schwagmeyer, Former basketball player in Australia, Romania, Spain, and Serbia
- Allan Nevins, American historian and journalist, former president of the American Historical Association, and two-time Pulitzer Prize winner who graduated from Maplewood High School in Camp Point (before school district unification) in 1908
- Elizabeth Stanley, Tony-nominated actress in Broadway Musicals
