= Central Elementary School (New Bern, North Carolina) =

Historic school building in North Carolina, United States

- U.S. National Register of Historic Places
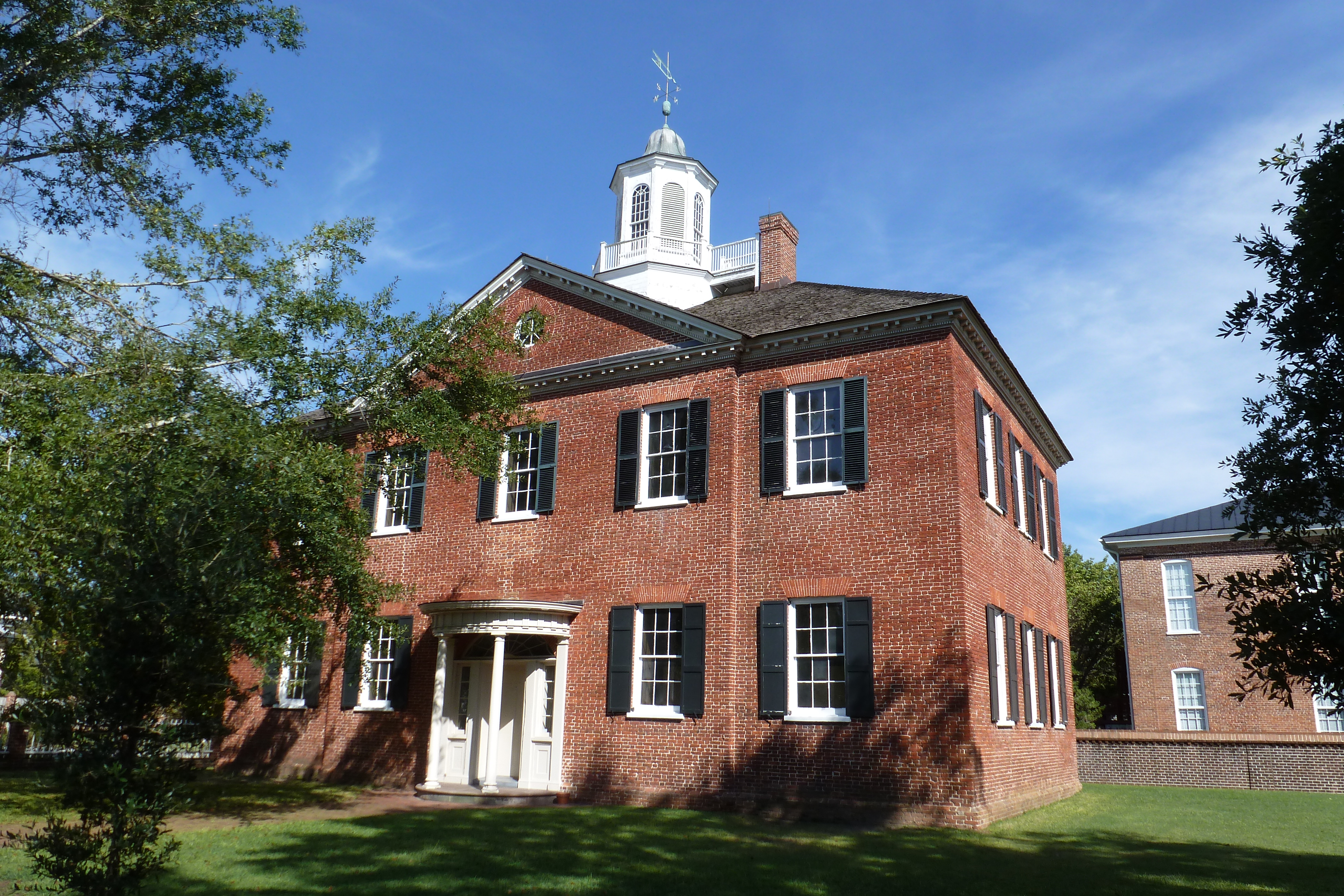
- The first academy building, September 2012

- Location within North Carolina Location within the United States
- Location: 311-313 New St. and 517 Hancock St., New Bern, North Carolina
- Coordinates: 35.1103°N 77.0415°W
- Area: 7 acres (2.8 ha)
- Built: 1806
- Architect: James Coor, Mr. Carroll
- NRHP reference No.: 72000938
- Added to NRHP: January 20, 1972

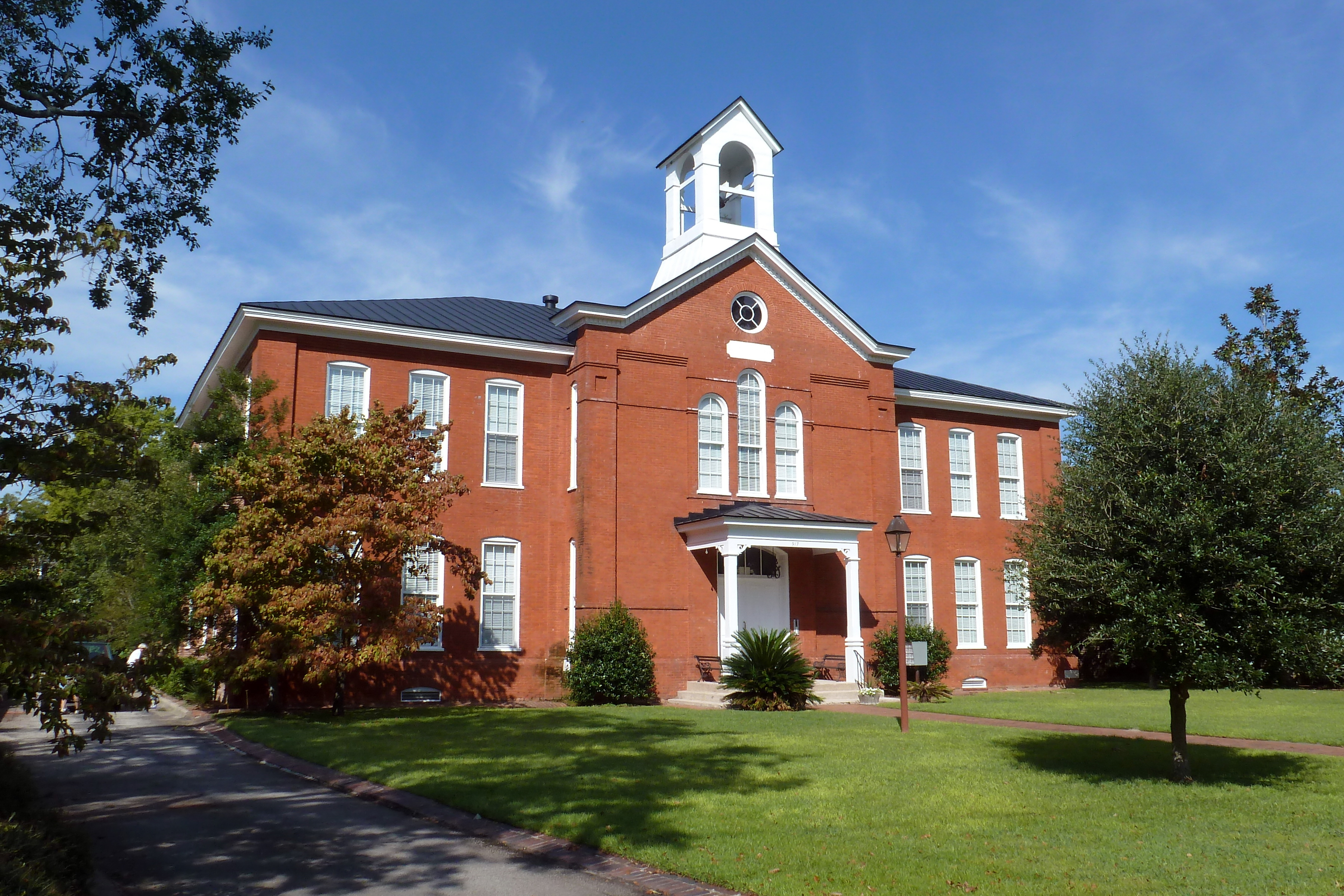
The second academy building, September 2012

Central Elementary School is a pair of historic school buildings in New Bern, Craven County, North Carolina. The First New Bern Academy is located on New Street and was built about 1806. It is a two-story, Flemish bond brick building with a hipped roof and two interior ridge chimneys. It features a semicircular tetrastyle entrance porch with Tuscan order columns and a roof cupola. It has a rear addition dated to the late-19th century. The Second New Bern Academy was built in 1884 to replace the previous building. The buildings retained their educational functions until 1971. The 1806 building now houses a museum, while the 1884 building has been converted into apartments.

The buildings were listed on the National Register of Historic Places in 1972.
