= Central School (Martins Ferry, Ohio) =

- Formerly listed on the U.S. National Register of Historic Places
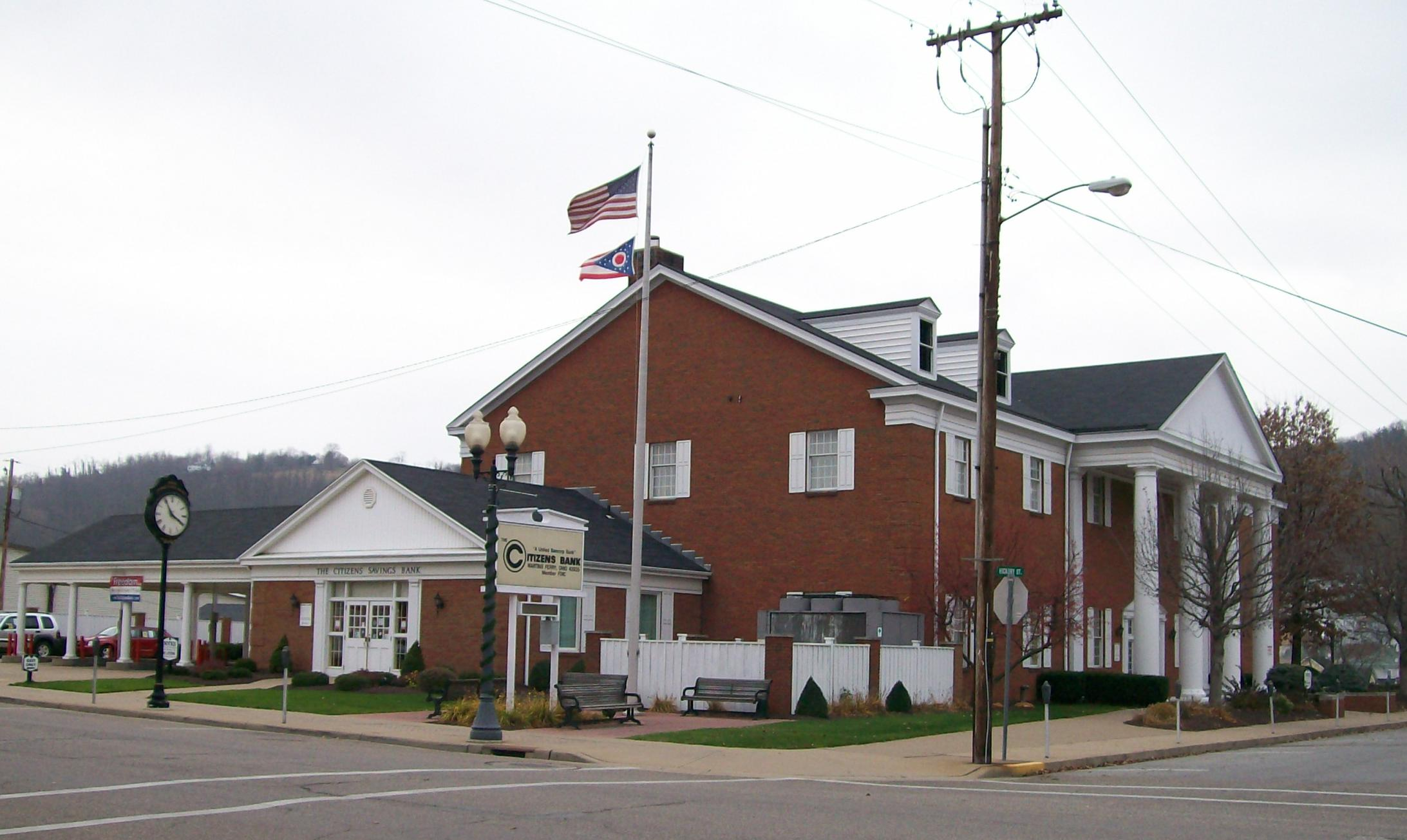
- The site of the Central School in Martins Ferry

- Location within Ohio Location within the United States
- Location: Hickory and S. 4th Sts., Martins Ferry, Ohio
- Coordinates: 40°5′41.45″N 80°43′31.5″W
- Area: 0 acres (0 ha)
- Built: 1897
- Architect: C.H. Owsley; Benjamin Exley
- Architectural style: Romanesque, Richardsonian Romanesque
- NRHP reference No.: 79001786

Significant dates
- Added to NRHP: July 23, 1979
- Removed from NRHP: February 21, 1980

The Central School was a school building in Martins Ferry, Ohio, United States. Located at the corner of South 4th and Hickory Streets, the school was listed on the National Register of Historic Places on July 23, 1979. It is no longer on the Register: the designation was removed on February 21, 1980, less than a year after it was added. Designed by Benjamin Exley and C.H. Owsley, it was built in 1897 in the Richardsonian Romanesque style of architecture.

The building was demolished to make room for the Citizens National Bank, the current owners.
