= Central Middle School =

Central Middle School may refer to a number of middle schools:

In the United States:

- Central Middle School of Science (Anchorage, Alaska)
- Central Middle School (San Carlos, California)
- Princess Ruth Keʻelikōlani Middle School in Honolulu, Hawaii; previously known as Central Middle School
- Central Middle School (Kokomo, Indiana)
- Central Middle School (Quincy, Massachusetts)
- Central Middle School (Midland, Michigan)
- Central Middle School (Kansas City, Missouri)
- Central Middle School (Parsippany, New Jersey)
- Central Middle School (Devils Lake, North Dakota)
- Central Middle School (Galveston, Texas)
- Central Middle School (Evergreen Park, Illinois)

== See also ==
- Central Junior High School
