= Great Falls Central High School =

Great Falls Central High School may refer to:

- Great Falls Central High School, a historic public high school in Great Falls, Montana, constructed in 1896 and closed in 1930. It served as a junior high school and middle school until 1975, when it closed.
- Great Falls Central High School, a Catholic parochial high school in Great Falls, Montana, constructed in 1950 and closed in 1973.
- Great Falls Central Catholic High School, a Catholic parochial high school in Great Falls, Montana, which opened in fall 2001 and moved into its own building in fall 2007.
