= Canton, Iowa =

- Unincorporated community
- Location within Iowa Location within the United States
- Coordinates: 42°09′48″N 90°53′45″W
- Country: United States
- State: Iowa
- Counties: Jackson, Jones
- Elevation: 728 ft (222 m)
- Time zone: UTC-6 (Central (CST))
  - Summer (DST): UTC-5 (CDT)
- Area code: 563
- GNIS feature ID: 455154

Canton is an unincorporated community in Jackson and Jones counties, Iowa, United States.

== History ==
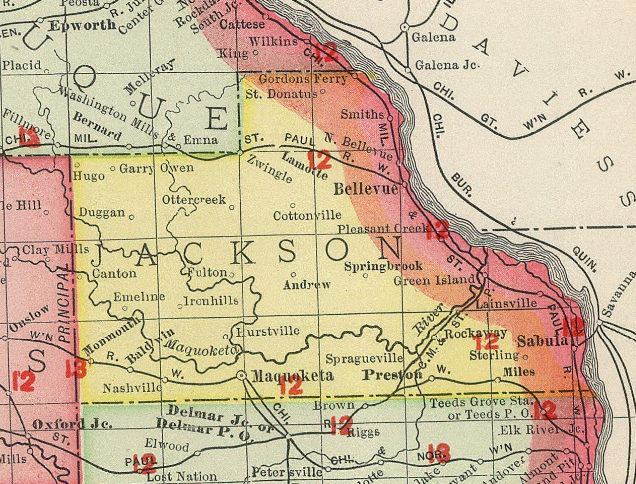
Map of Jackson County, Iowa, in 1903. Canton is located on the eastern side of the county.

In the mid-19th century, Canton contained a flouring mill, a saw mill and a woolen factory powered by the waters of its river. Canton's population was 210 in 1902, and 75 in 1925. The population was 54 in 1940.
