= Santa Rosa County District Schools =

School district in Florida, United States

Address
- 6032 Highway 90 Milton, Florida, 32570; United States

District information
- Type: Public
- Grades: PreK–12
- NCES District ID: 1201650

Students and staff
- Students: 27,770
- Teachers: 1,580.34 (FTE)
- Staff: 1,313.07
- Student–teacher ratio: 17.57

Other information
- Website: www.santarosaschools.org

Santa Rosa County District Schools (SRCDS), also known as Santa Rosa County School District, is the organization responsible for the administration of public schools in Santa Rosa County, Florida. The district currently administers 15 elementary schools, seven middle schools, seven high schools, and two K-8 schools, as well as a number of specialized centers.

Its headquarters are in Milton.

The district is currently administered by a superintendent and a five-member school board. The current Superintendent of Schools is Dr. Karen Barber.

== Schools ==
=== High schools ===
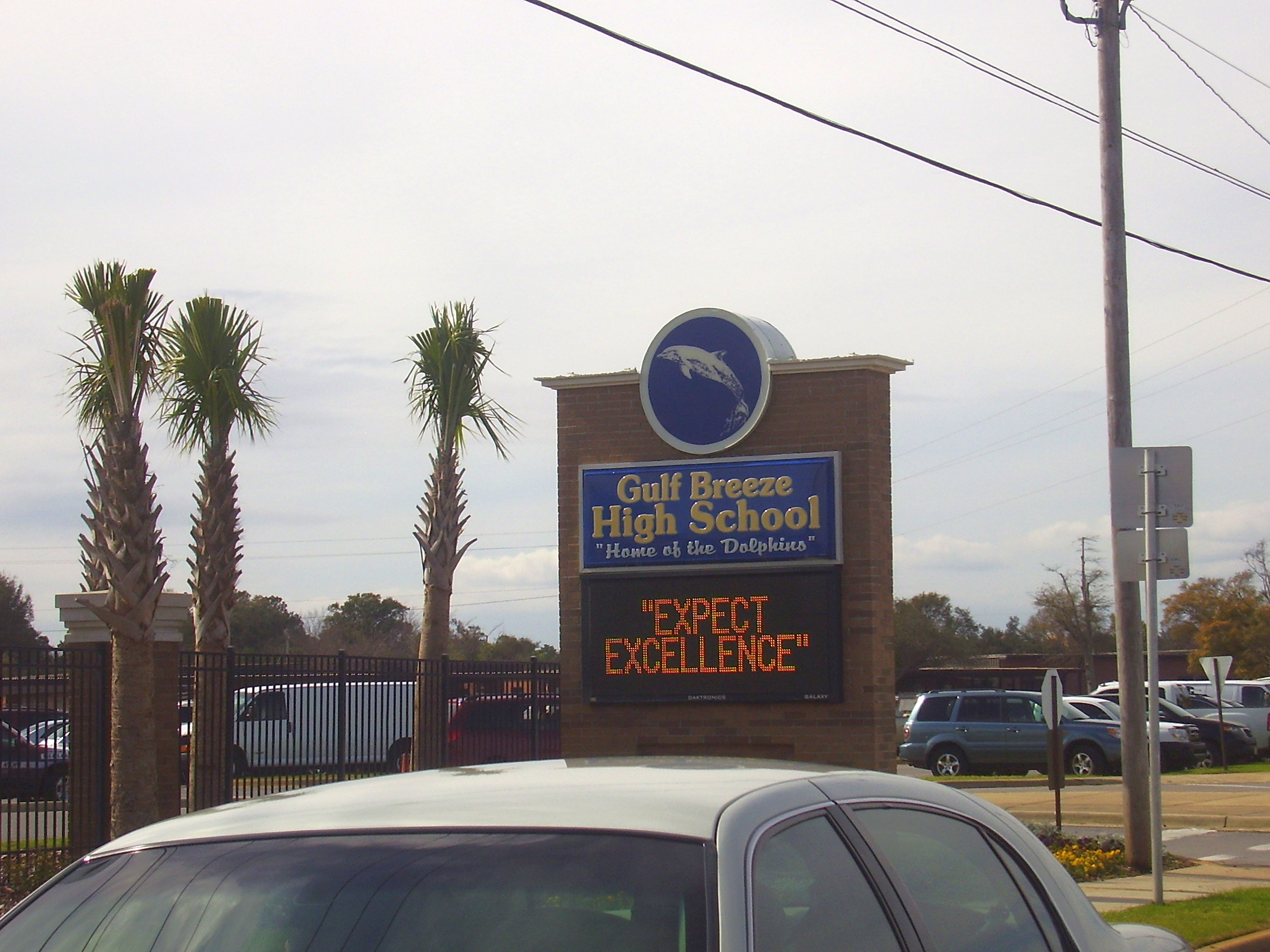
Gulf Breeze High School

- Gulf Breeze High School (Dolphin)
- Soundside High School (Hurricanes)
- Navarre High School (Raider)
- Pace High School (Patriot)
- Milton High School (Panther)
- Jay High School (Royal)
- Central School (Jaguar)
- Santa Rosa High

=== Middle schools ===
- Gulf Breeze Middle School
- Woodlawn Beach Middle School
- East Bay K-8 School
- Wallace Lake K-8 School
- Holley-Navarre Middle School
- Avalon Middle School
- King Middle School
- Hobbs Middle School
- Sims Middle School
- Central School

=== Elementary schools ===
- Gulf Breeze Elementary School
- Oriole Beach Elementary School
- East Bay K-8 School
- Wallace Lake K-8 School
- West Navarre Intermediate School
- West Navarre Primary School
- Holley-Navarre Primary School
- Holley-Navarre Intermediate School
- Pea Ridge Elementary School
- Bagdad Elementary School
- Berryhill Elementary School
- S.S. Dixon Primary School
- S.S. Dixon Intermediate School
- East Milton Elementary School
- Chumuckla Elementary School
- W.H. Rhodes Elementary School
- Jay Elementary School
- Central School
- Bennett C. Russell Elementary School

=== Specialized Centers ===
- Locklin Technical College
- Santa Rosa Adult School
- Santa Rosa Community School
- T.R. Jackson Pre-K Center
