= Central School (East Lansing, Michigan) =

- U.S. National Register of Historic Places
- Michigan State Historic Site
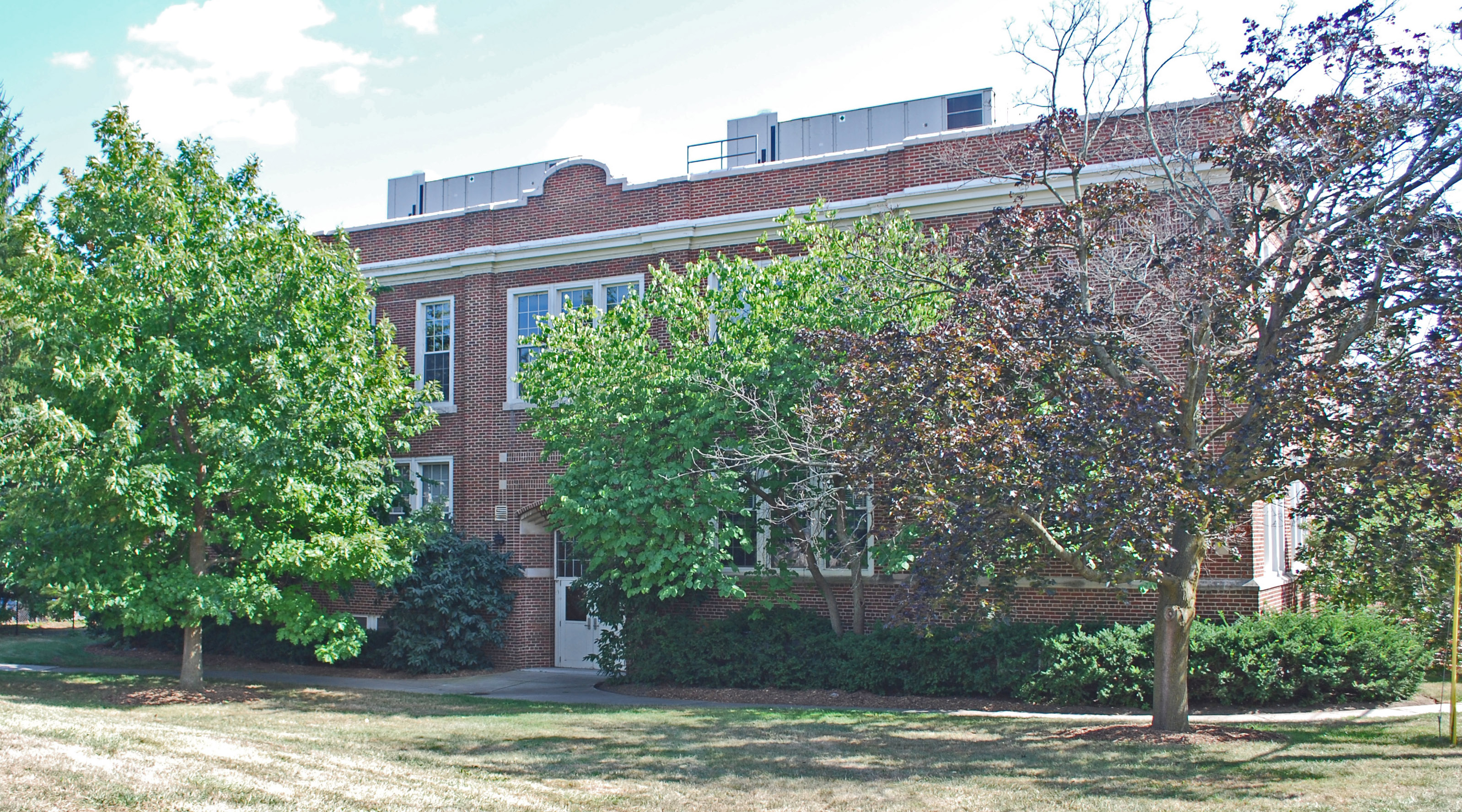

- Location within Michigan Location within the United States
- Interactive map
- Location: 325 W. Grand River Ave., East Lansing, Michigan
- Coordinates: 42°44′11″N 84°29′20″W
- Area: 1.7 acres (0.69 ha)
- Built: 1917
- Architect: Edwyn Bowd, Et al.
- Architectural style: Neoclassical
- NRHP reference No.: 86000709
- Added to NRHP: April 10, 1986

The Central School is a school building located at 325 West Grand River Avenue in East Lansing, Michigan. It was listed on the National Register of Historic Places in 1986. The building now houses Michigan State University's Child Development Laboratories.

== History ==
For years after the Michigan Agricultural College (now Michigan State University) was founded in 1855, children in the area were tutored at home or in some cases were sent to schools in nearby Lansing. However, at the end of the nineteenth century, the college population began growing and a new school district encompassing the college and surrounding residential areas was established in 1900. The first school building was constructed in late 1901, located on the spot of the present building. Due to rising enrollment, the school was enlarged in 1905 and 1909.

However, in 1916, a disastrous fire completely destroyed the school. The school board contracted Lansing architect Edwyn Bowd to design a new fireproof school, and the building was constructed the following year. It was the only school building in East Lansing until 1922, and served high school students until a separate high school was built in 1927. A library addition was constructed in 1937, and four workrooms were added in 1952. It continued to be used as an elementary school by the district until 1984, when it was closed due to declining enrollment. The district sold the school to private developers. It was eventually purchased by Michigan State University, and now houses the University's Child Development Laboratories.

== Description ==
The Central School is a two-story red brick Neoclassical building with a flat roof, measuring 70 feet by 100 feet. It sits on a raised foundation, with a cut stone beltcourse separating the foundation from the upper floors. The front facade is five bays wide, with the three center bays slightly recessed. The center bay has a recessed entrance with paired doors and a transom under a segmental arch. Brick Tuscan pilasters flank the doors. The windows are set in groupings of three double hung multi-light sash-type units, separated by wooden mullions. An iron cornice circles the building save for the center of the front facade.
