= An Equal Playing Field =

- Written by: Gwendolyn Oxenham, Erit Yellen
- Directed by: Rebekah Fergusson, Gwendolyn Oxenham
- Starring: Christen Press; Julie Foudy
- Country of origin: United States
- Original language: English
- No. of episodes: 1

Production
- Producers: Julie Foudy, Frank Marshall
- Running time: 7:44 minutes

Original release
- Network: Takepart.com
- Release: June 8, 2015

An Equal Playing Field is a 2015 sports documentary about American soccer player Christen Press and the challenges of being a women's soccer player.

In 2016, it was shown at the Women's Sports Film Festival in Oakland, California.
