= Central Bucks High School =

Central Bucks High School may refer to any of the three high schools in the Central Bucks School District:

- Central Bucks High School East, Buckingham, Pennsylvania
- Central Bucks High School South, Warrington, Pennsylvania
- Central Bucks High School West, Doylestown, Pennsylvania
