= Central School (Milton, Florida) =

Central High School

Location
- 6180 Central School Road; Milton, Florida; United States; 30.7641°N 87.0753°W

Information
- Type: Public
- Established: 1983
- School district: Santa Rosa County School District
- NCES School ID: 120165001813
- Dean: Melissa Holland
- Principal: Klinton Lay
- Faculty: 46.00 (FTE)
- Grades: PreK to 12
- Enrollment: 643 (2022-2023)
- Student to teacher ratio: 13.98
- Colors: Navy and Silver
- Mascot: Jaguar
- Rival: Jay High School
- Website: cs.santarosaschools.org/en-US

Central School is a public high school in Allentown, Santa Rosa County, Florida, United States. It is located at 6180 Central School Road. The school's teams compete as the Jaguars.

== History ==
Central was founded in 1983, when Allentown School (which previously occupied the lot), Munson School, and Chumuckla School merged into one school.

Before that, Allentown School was founded in 1923 as the Santa Rosa Agricultural School. Allentown itself was three schools (Allentown, Botts, and Solidblock) consolidated into one. The school was the first in the county to operate under the Smith-Hughes Act. The county purchased three Model T chassis that were modified by educator M. Luther King to be used for one of the earliest school busses in the entire Southeast.

== Sports ==
=== Boys ===
Central has varsity baseball, basketball, weightlifting, and golf boys' teams. The school also has Junior varsity baseball, basketball, and football, which was introduced in 2023. The schools freshmen boys' sports include baseball and basketball.

=== Girls ===
Central hosts varsity girls' volleyball, basketball, softball, track and field, weightlifting, and cross country. Central has JV and freshmen basketball, volleyball, and softball.

=== History ===
For the first two years of Central's Basketball Team, they were led by Terry Allen, who, at the time of his graduation, was the second all-time leading scorer in Florida high school basketball history.

In 2021, Central's High School Varsity Basketball Team, coached by Wesley Matthews, were the runners-up for the FHSAA Boys Basketball Championship.

In 2023, Central introduced Football for the first time, but (as of December 2023) they are yet to have a field at the school itself.
