= New Era =

New Era may refer to:

== Places ==
- New Era, Michigan, United States, a village
- New Era, Oregon, United States, an unincorporated community
- New Era, West Virginia, United States, an unincorporated community
- New Era Park, Sacramento, California, United States, a neighborhood
- New Era, Quezon City, a barangay in Metro Manila, Philippines
- New Era, South Australia, a late-19th century village settlement where the town of Cadell is now

== Arts, entertainment, and media ==
=== Newspapers ===
- The New Era (newspaper), weekly newspaper in Sweet Home, Oregon
- New Era (Florida newspaper), former weekly newspaper in Gainesville, Florida
- New National Era, a newspaper in Washington, D.C., once known as New Era
- New Era (Namibia), state-owned newspaper of the government of Namibia
- New Era, the first newspaper in St. Louis, Missouri, published by Charles G. Ramsey
- New Era, a newspaper in Gainesville, Florida during Reconstruction

=== Television ===
- "A New Era" (Survivor), an episode in Survivor 41.
- "The New Era" (The O.C.), second-season T.V. episode of The O.C.

=== Music ===
- New Era (Cloudscape album), 2012 album by the Swedish metal band Cloudscape
- New Era (Kiss Daniel album), debut album of Nigerian musician Kiss Daniel
- New Era (Revolution Renaissance album), debut album of Revolution Renaissance
- The New Era (album), 2018 album by Got7
- New Era Orchestra, a classical music orchestra from Kyiv
- New Era, album by Andreas Ottensamer
- "New Era", a 2020 song by SixTones

=== Other ===
- Downton Abbey: A New Era (film), a 2022 film, the second Downton Abbey movie
- New Era (magazine), youth magazine of The Church of Jesus Christ of Latter-day Saints
- New Era (novel), 1908 novel by Bigehuan Zhuren

== Education ==
- New Era University, in the Philippines, run by the Iglesia ni Cristo
- New Era University College, a non-profit, private university college in Malaysia
- New Era High School, Bahá'í school in Panchgani, Maharashtra, India
- New Era Academy, charter school in Baltimore, Maryland

== Organizations ==
- New Era (automobile company), 1901–1902, Camden, New Jersey, U.S.
- New Era Cap Company, manufacturer of headwear, based in Buffalo, New York, USA
- New Era Motors, producer of the Ruxton automobile, 1929–1930
- New Era Publications, a publishing arm of the Church of Scientology
- New Era Tickets, entertainment ticketing company in Wayne, Pennsylvania
- Foundation for New Era Philanthropy, Ponzi scheme in the U.S. which collapsed in 1995

== Politics ==
- New Era Party, a Latvian political party
- New Era (Prussia), the term for the government policy in the Kingdom of Prussia, (1858–1862)
- New Era of Socialism with Chinese Characteristics, the term for the era of Chinese history beginning with CCP General Secretary Xi Jinping's tenure in 2012
  - Xi Jinping Thought on Socialism with Chinese Characteristics for a New Era, a political theory of Chinese Communist Party

== Other uses ==
- New Era (ship), a list of ships with the same name

== See also ==
- New Era Building (disambiguation)
- ERA (disambiguation)
- New Age (disambiguation)
- Naya Daur (disambiguation)
- Pudhu Yugam (disambiguation)
- A New Era of Thought, by Charles Howard Hinton, about the fourth dimension
- Coventry Automatics Aka the Specials: Dawning of a New Era, compilation album
