= Modern =

Modern may refer to:

== History ==
- Modern history
  - Early Modern period
  - Late Modern period
    - 18th century
    - 19th century
    - 20th century
  - Contemporary history
- Moderns, a faction of Freemasonry that existed in the 18th century

== Philosophy and sociology ==
- Modernity, a loosely defined concept delineating a number of societal, economic and ideological features that contrast with "pre-modern" times or societies
  - Late modernity

== Art ==
- Modernism
  - Modernist poetry
- Modern art, a form of art
- Modern dance, a dance form developed in the early 20th century
- Modern architecture, a broad movement and period in architectural history
  - Moderne, multiple architectural styles
  - Modernisme a.k.a. Catalan Modernism
- Modern music (disambiguation)

== Geography ==
- Modra, a Slovak city, referred to in the German language as "Modern"

== Typography ==
- Modern (typeface), a raster font packaged with Windows XP
- Another name for the typeface classification known as Didone (typography)
- Modern, a generic font family name for fixed-pitch serif and sans serif fonts (for example, Courier and Pica), used e.g. in OpenDocument format or Rich Text Format

== Music ==
- Modern (Buzzcocks album)
- Modern (EP), an EP by Gas
- Modern Records, a Los Angeles record label
- Modern (Amber Smith album)

== Other uses ==
- Modernform Group, traded as MODERN, a furniture manufacturer and distributor in Thailand
- Modern Defense, a chess opening
- Modern (political party), Polish political party

== See also ==
- Contemporary (disambiguation)
- Early modern human
- Modern age (disambiguation)
- Modern agriculture (disambiguation)
- Modern English
- Modern liberalism in the United States
- Modern Man (disambiguation)
- Modern paganism
- Modern philosophy
- Modern republicanism
- Modern Times (disambiguation)
- Postmodernism
- The Modern (disambiguation)
