= Cloudscape =

Cloudscape may refer to:

- Cloudscape (art), a depiction of clouds or sky
  - Cloudscape photography, a photographic view of clouds or sky
- Cloudscape (band), a progressive metal band from Sweden
  - Cloudscape (album), Cloudscape's self-titled debut album
- Cloudscape, previous name of Apache Derby, a relational database management system
