= Modern man =

Modern man may refer to:

- Modernity, recent history and society, especially:

- The modern individual or everyman
- The contemporary human condition

- Anatomically modern humans, Homo sapiens of the last 200,000 years

== Books and magazines ==
- Modern Man (magazine), a defunct monthly men's magazine

== Film ==
- Modern Man (film), a 2006 experimental drama by Justin Swibel

== Television ==
- Modern Men, American television sitcom starring Eric Lively, Josh Braaten, Max Greenfield, and Jane Seymour
- "Modern Men" (Only Fools and Horses), television episode of Only Fools and Horses

== Music ==
- Modern Man (band)
- Modern Man (album), album by Stanley Clarke
- Modern Man (Maccabees), album by Dissident Prophet
- Modern Man (Michael Peterson album)
- "Modern Man", a song by Bad Religion from the album Against the Grain
- "Modern Man", a song by Black Flag from the album Loose Nut
- "Modern Man", a song by Arcade Fire from the album The Suburbs
- "Modern Man", a song by Ivan and Alyosha from the album It's All Just Pretend

== See also ==
- Modern (disambiguation)
- Modern World (disambiguation)
- "Modern Woman", song by Billy Joel from the album The Bridge
- Man (word)
- Human
- "Morderne Man", song by M from the album New York–London–Paris–Munich
