= John Lake House =

Historic house in Iowa, United States

- U.S. National Register of Historic Places
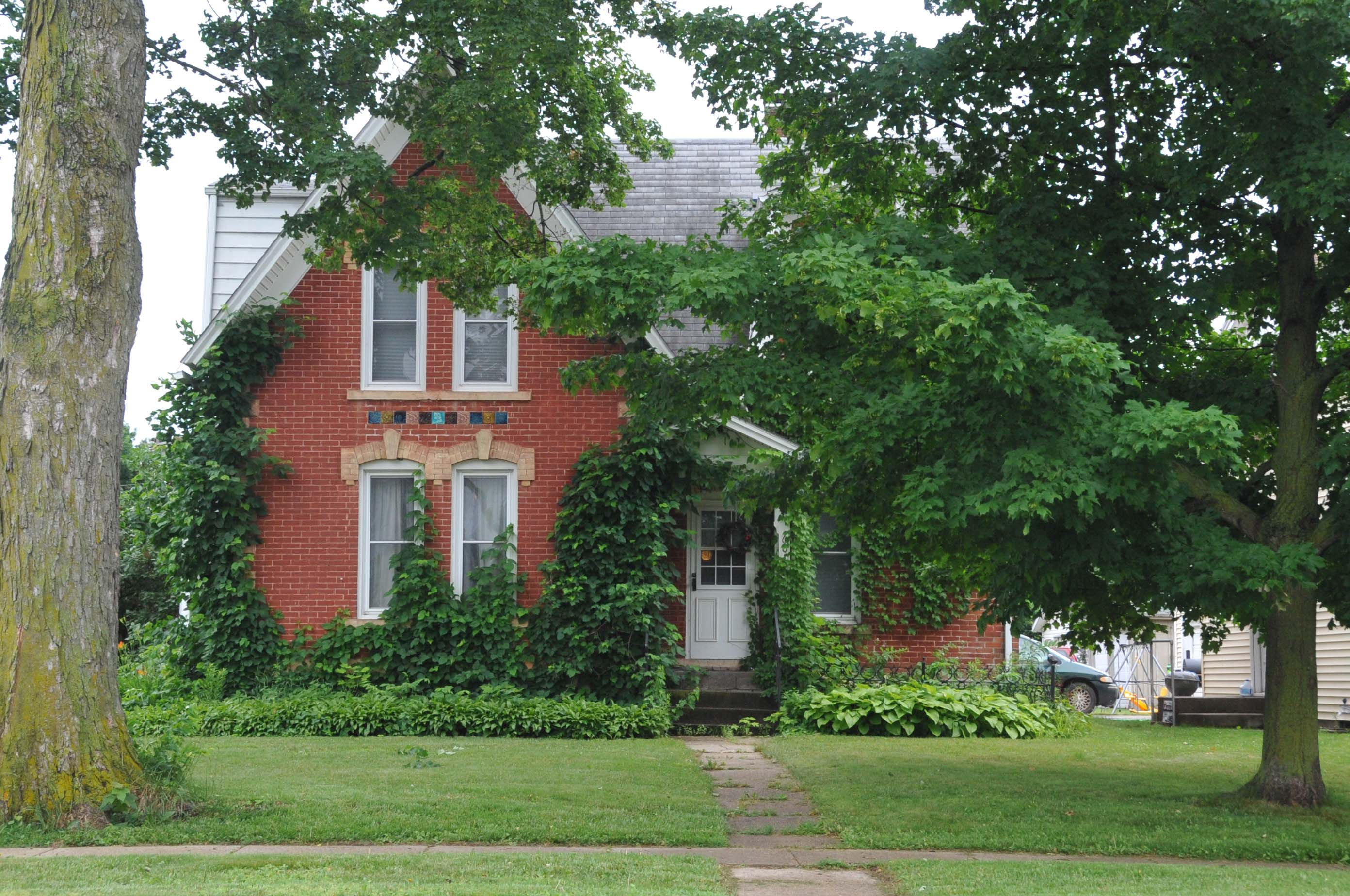

- Location within Iowa Location within the United States
- Location: 601 W. Platt St. Maquoketa, Iowa
- Coordinates: 42°04′06″N 90°40′19″W
- Area: less than one acre
- Built: 1890
- Architectural style: Late Victorian
- MPS: Maquoketa MPS
- NRHP reference No.: 91000969
- Added to NRHP: December 30, 1991

The John Lake House is a historic residence located in Maquoketa, Iowa, United States. This is one of several Victorian houses in Maquoketa that are noteworthy for their quoined corners, a rare architectural feature in Iowa. Built around 1890, the 1½-story house features limestone quoins, a gable roof, gambrel dormers on the north and east elevations, a polygonal bay under the east dormer, two small porches, and a gabled wing on the west side. A unique feature on this house are the glazed colored tiles on the main facade. John Lake was a local builder, who is associated with the construction of the New Era Building and the IOOF Building. It is possible he built this house as well, although the builder has not been determined. The house was listed on the National Register of Historic Places in 1991.
