= Charles Ramsay =

Charles Ramsay may refer to:

- Charles Aloysius Ramsay (fl. 1677–1680), Scottish-Prussian writer on stenography
- Charles Maule Ramsay (1859–1936), British Army officer and politician
- Charles Ramsay (stuntman), British stuntman
- Charles Ramsay (British Army officer, born 1936) (1936–2017), British Army officer
- Charles Ramsay, 7th Earl of Dalhousie (died 1764), Earl of Dalhousie
- Charles Ramsay (ice hockey), American ice hockey player in the French Ice Hockey Hall of Fame
- Sir Charles Ramsay, 3rd Baronet (died 1695) of the Ramsay baronets

== See also ==
- Charles Ramsey (disambiguation)
