= New Era Building =

New Era Building may refer to:

- New Era Building (Maquoketa, Iowa)
- New Era Building (New York City)
- New Era Building (Lancaster, Pennsylvania)

== See also ==
- New Era (disambiguation)
