= Tazata =

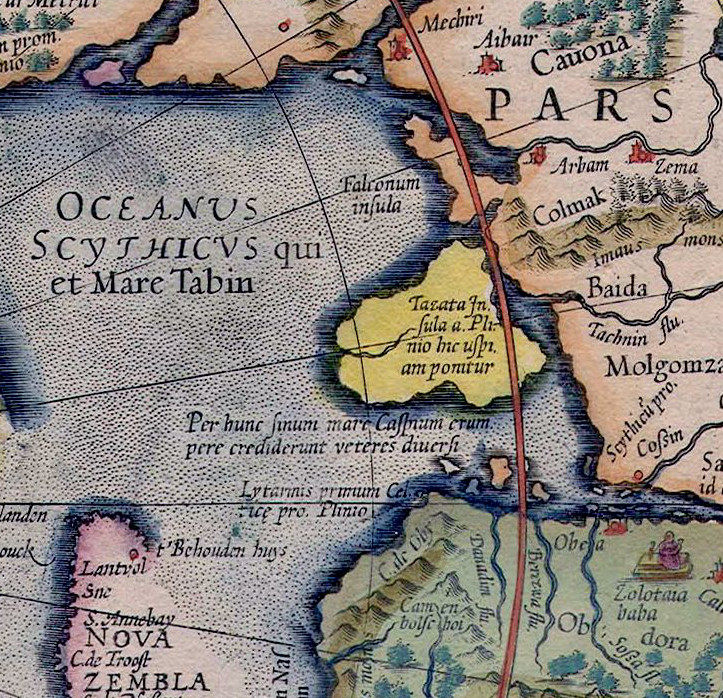
Tazata Island, in yellow, in Mercator Arctic map (1623)

Tazata (also attested as Tasata and Zazata) was a phantom island in the Caspian Sea or the Arctic Ocean, whose existence was posited by some ancient authors and which appeared on geographical maps until the 17th century.

== In antiquity ==
Among the surviving ancient references to a large island in the Caspian Sea, the oldest is that of the geographer Pomponius Mela, who in AD 43, in his De chorographia, speaks of an island named Talge, which according to some authors corresponds to Tazata, while according to others it does not.

The island of Talge in the Caspian Sea is so fertile without cultivation that it abounds in every produce and fruit; but the neighboring peoples consider it a sin and sacrilege to touch what grows there, believing it prepared for the gods and to be preserved for them.

— Pomponius Mela, De chorographia

The island of Tazata, or Zazata, is mentioned by Pliny the Elder in his Naturalis Historia, dating to AD 77 or 78. In this text, which Pliny composed using information drawn from earlier authors, it is placed near a strait that, according to the geographical knowledge of the time, connected the Caspian Sea to the Scythian Ocean—the name then used for the Arctic Ocean.

There are many islands throughout this sea, the most famous being Zazata. From the Caspian Sea and the Scythian Ocean, our course turns toward the Eastern Ocean, following the coastline as it turns east.

— Pliny the Elder, Naturalis Historia, Book VI, 19–20

== In cartography ==
Tazata is shown on many geographical maps from various periods, which predominantly place it in the Arctic Ocean and specifically within a vast gulf (which Mercator calls Mare Tabin and Barents Mare Tartaricum), which may correspond to the Kara Sea, since it is bordered by the Novaya Zemlya archipelago and by the cape of the same name, identified by some scholars as Cape Chelyuskin, the northernmost tip of the Taymyr Peninsula. Among these maps are the Septentrionalium Terrarum descriptio by Gerardus Mercator (1595), which explicitly cites Pliny as the source for including the island, the Delineatio cartae by Willem Barentsz (1598), the Theatrum Orbis Terrarum by Blaeu (1645), and The English Atlas by Moses Pitt (1680).

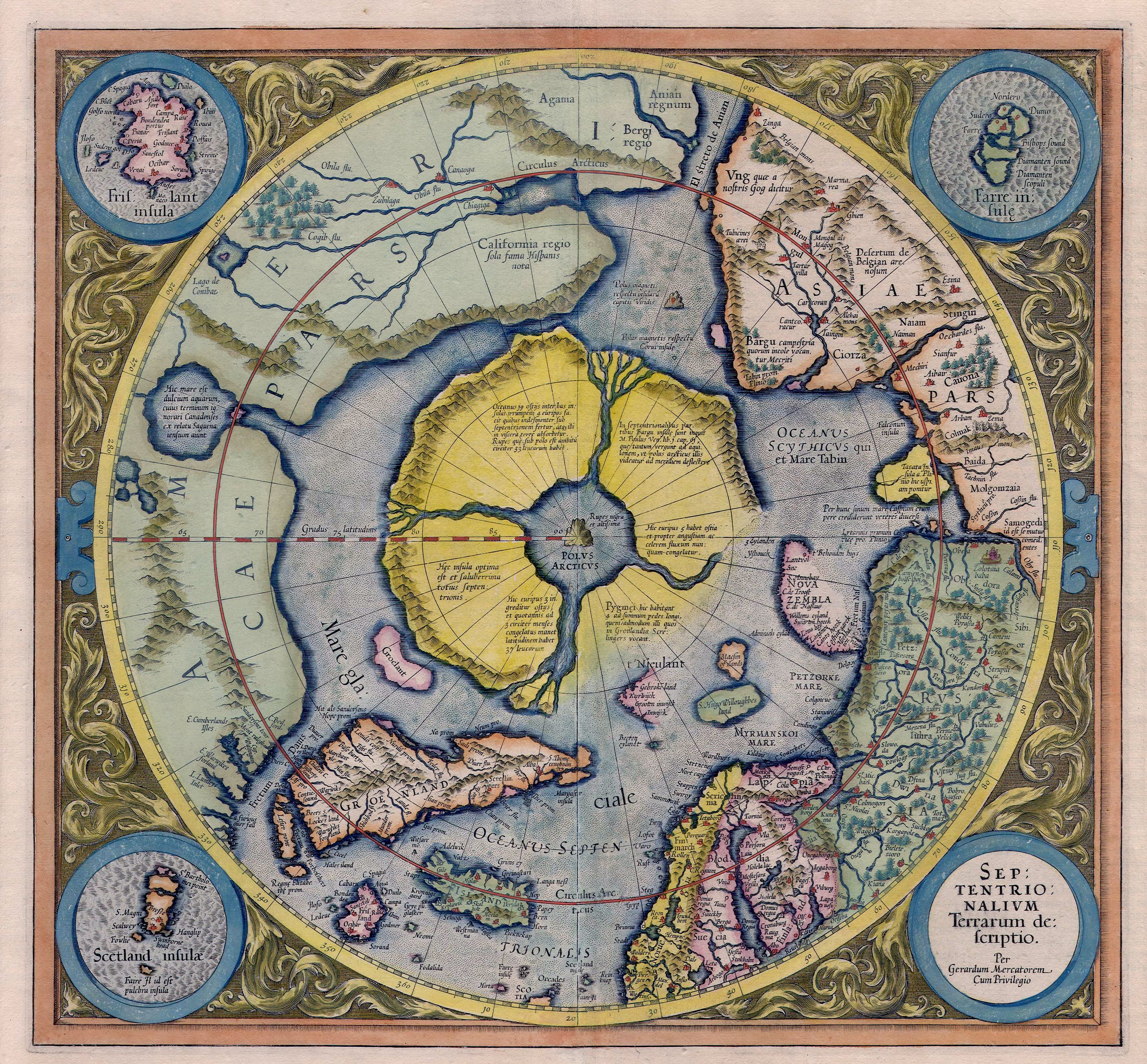
In Mercator (1623; 1st ed. 1595), Tazata is on the right, shown in yellow

Barentsz (1598) places the island in the lower right

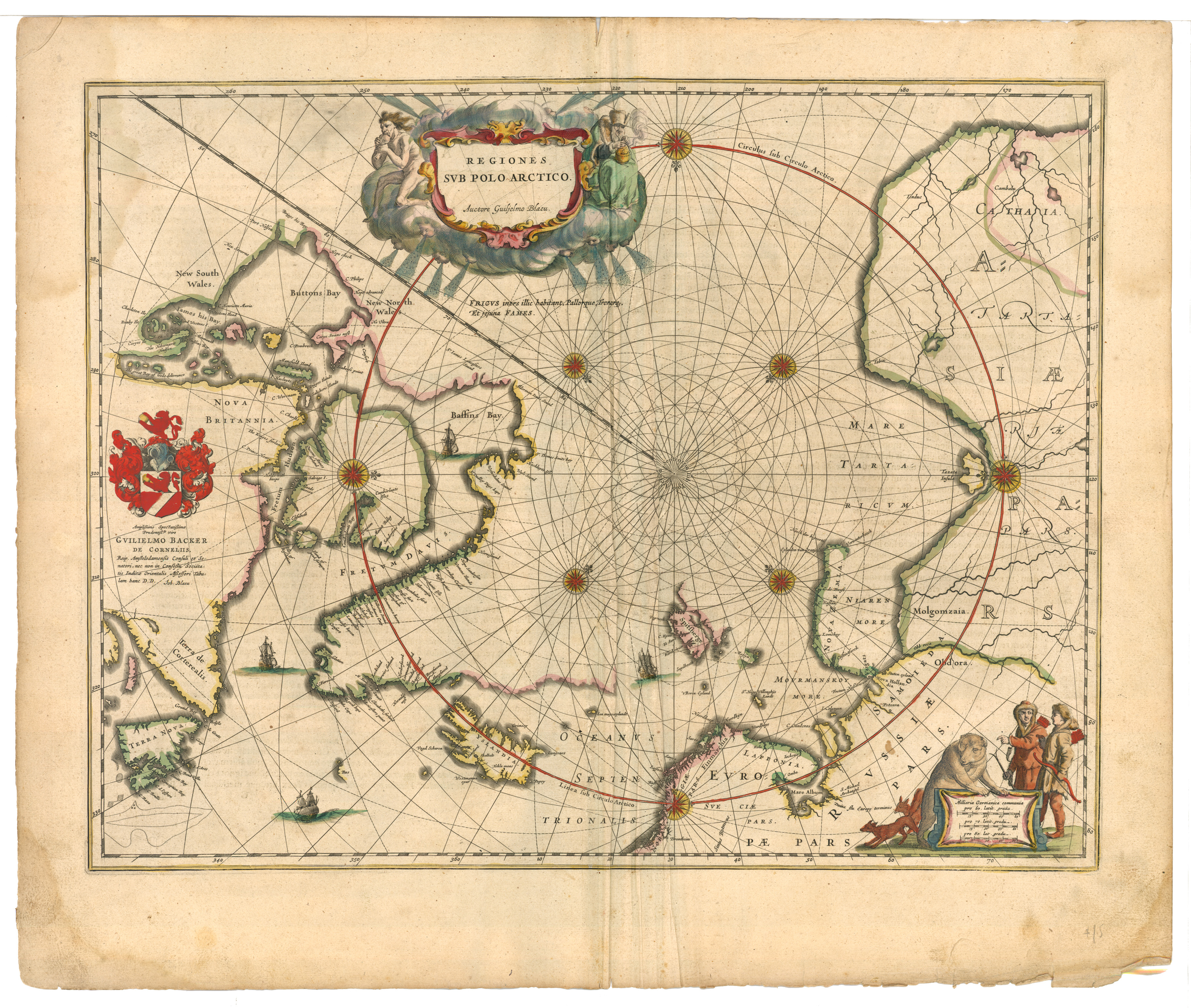
In Blaeu (1645), Tazata is located on the right

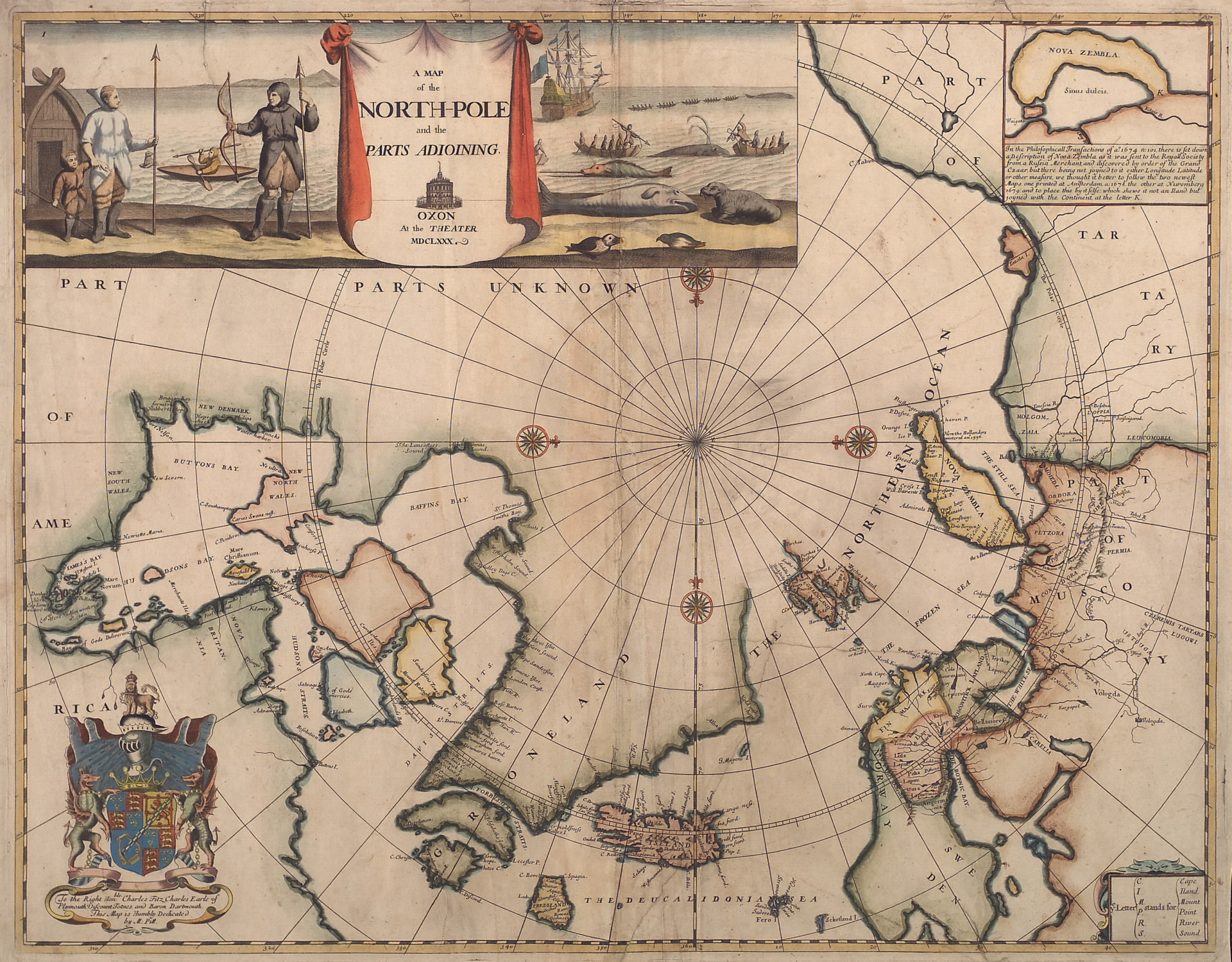
In Pitt (1680), the island is at the top right, shown in red

== In modern times ==
In modern times, the ancient attestations of Tazata were not considered reliable. In 1730, the Swedish geographer Philip Johan von Strahlenberg put forward the hypothesis that Tazata corresponded to the Novaya Zemlya archipelago, although on most maps depicting Tazata, Novaya Zemlya itself is also shown further west. Von Strahlenberg's assumption was later accepted by other authors, but it was criticized by Vasily Tatishchev in his Russian History (1768), who argued that locating the island in the Arctic Ocean was baseless. Tatishchev suggested that it might instead coincide with the region between the Caspian Sea and the Aral Sea, or with Ogurchinsky Island in the Krasnovodsk Gulf. More recently, scholars have hypothesized that Tazata, as depicted on Mercator's map, corresponds to the Taymyr Peninsula combined with the Severnaya Zemlya archipelago.
