= ProgPower =

ProgPower is the name of four progressive and power metal festivals:

- ProgPower Europe (formerly called ProgPower), held in the Netherlands since 1999
- ProgPower USA, held in the United States since 2001
- ProgPower UK, held in the United Kingdom in 2006 and 2007
- ProgPower Scandinavia, held in Denmark in 2007 and 2008
