= Charles Ramsey =

Charles Ramsey may refer to:

- Charles H. Ramsey (born 1950), Philadelphia police commissioner and DC police chief
- Charles Ramsey (basketball) (born 1961), head coach of the Eastern Michigan Eagles men's basketball team, 2005–2011
- Fred Ramsey (Charles Frederic Ramsey Jr., 1915–1995), record producer
- Charles Ramsey (Royal Navy officer) (1882–1966), British admiral
- Charles G. Ramsey (c. 1821–1887), American newspaper publisher
- Chuck Ramsey (born 1952), American football player
- Charles Ramsey, witness in the case of the Ariel Castro kidnappings

== See also ==
- Charles Ramsay (disambiguation)
