= Naya Daur =

Naya Daur (lit. 'New Era') may refer to:

- Naya Daur (1957 film), an Indian Hindi-language drama film by B. R. Chopra
- Naya Daur (1978 film), a 1978 Indian Hindi-language film
- Naya Daur (magazine), an Urdu-language literary magazine in India, once edited by Ali Jawad Zaidi

== See also ==
- New Era (disambiguation)
- New Times (disambiguation)
