= Global Drama =

Studio album by Cloudscape
- Released: August 16, 2008
- Recorded: Recorded at "RoastingHouse studio One"
- Genre: Progressive metal, Power metal
- Length: 62 Minutes
- Label: Goldencore (EU), Nightmare Records (U.S, Canada)
- Producer: Pontus Lindmark

Cloudscape chronology
| Crimson Skies (2006) | Global Drama (2008) | New Era (2012) |

Professional ratings
Review scores
| Source | Rating |
|---|---|
| Sea Of Tranquillity | 4.5/5 stars |

Global Drama is a 2008 studio album by the Swedish metal band Cloudscape. It is the band's third studio album, and the last to feature their founding lineup of Roger Landin (drums), Haynes Pherson (bass) and Björn Eliasson (guitar). Two musicvideos (Cloak & Daggers and Darkest Legacy) were released to promote Global Drama. The Opening track "Mind Diary" was featured as download to the video game Rock Band 3.

The album received review scores of 7/10 in Rock Hard, 9/10 in Artrock.se, 4/5 in Groove.se as well as other reviews including Metal.de and Powermetal.de.

== Tracklist ==
| No. | Title | Writer(s) | Length |
|---|---|---|---|
| 1. | "Mind Diary" | M. Andersson/R. Landin | 05.48 |
| 2. | "Darkest Legacy" | B. Eliasson | 03.40 |
| 3. | "Cloak & Daggers" | M. Andersson/R. Landin | 06.30 |
| 4. | "Paid In Blood" | M. Andersson/P. Svärd | 03.55 |
| 5. | "The Silence Within" | B. Eliasson/P. Svärd | 05.01 |
| 6. | "One Silent Moment" | M. Andersson | 4.32 |
| 7. | "Alagoas" | B. Eliasson | 08.20 |
| 8. | "Static" | M. Andersson/P. Svärd | 05.44 |
| 9. | "Fragile" | B. Eliasson | 04.07 |
| 10. | "Eyes Of Jealousy" | M. Andersson | 09.05 |
| 11. | "Ritual Of The Blade" | B. Eliasson/R. Landin | 05.01 |
| 12. | "Justice" | M. Andersson | 05.07 |

== Personnel ==
- Mike Andersson - Lead & Backing Vocals
- Björn Eliasson - Guitars
- Patrik Svärd - Guitars
- Haynes Pherson - Bass & Backing Vocals
- Roger Landin - Drums & Percussion
