= Modern age (disambiguation) =

Modern age is a period of history.

Modern age may also refer to:

- Modern Age (periodical), an American conservative academic quarterly journal
- The Modern Age of Comic Books, beginning in the mid-1980s
- The Modern Age, 2001 EP by The Strokes
- The Modern Age, 2019 album by Sleeper
- "The Modern Age", song by The Strokes from the album Is This It

== See also ==
- New Age (disambiguation)
