= Old Age (disambiguation) =

The latter part of a person's life is referred to as old age.

It may also refer to:

- Old Age (song), song by Hole, originally composed by Kurt Cobain of Nirvana
- Old Age, a painting in the series The Voyage of Life by Thomas Cole
- "Old Age", song by Louis Jordan
- "Old Age", B-side to Let's Party (Rhinoceros song)
- "Old Age", comedy sketch recorded by Phyllis Diller

== See also ==
- New Age (disambiguation)
