= Ny Tid (disambiguation) =

Ny Tid (lit. 'New Times' or 'Modern Times') is a Norwegian quarterly review of non-fiction books.

Ny Tid may also refer to:

- Ny Tid (Gothenburg), a Swedish-language news magazine
- Ny Tid (Finland), a Swedish-language Green leftist monthly magazine in Helsinki
- Ny Tid (Trondheim), a Norwegian workers' newspaper, 1899–1947
- Ny Tid (United States) or Svenska Socialisten, a Scandinavian newspaper 1905–1936
- Ny Tid (publishing house), connected to the Communist Party of Norway, 1924–1928

== See also ==
- New Times (disambiguation)
- Modern Times (disambiguation)
