= New Times =

New Times may refer to:

== Publications ==
- New Times (Adelaide), official publication of the Uniting Church in Australia, Synod of South Australia
- New Times (magazine), a bi-weekly American magazine published in the 1970s
- New Times Media, a former US publisher of alternative weekly newspapers
  - New Times Broward-Palm Beach, a newspaper published by Village Voice Media
  - Miami New Times, a newspaper published by Village Voice Media
  - Phoenix New Times, a newspaper published by Village Voice Media
  - New Times LA, a defunct newspaper formerly published by New Times Media
- New Times (San Luis Obispo), an alternative weekly newspaper
- New Times (Minneapolis), a 1920s Socialist Party of America newspaper in Minneapolis, Minnesota
- Syracuse New Times, a weekly alternative newspaper published in Syracuse, New York by Arthur Zimmer
- The New Times (Rwanda), a daily national newspaper published in Kigali, Rwanda

These publications have names that translate to English as New Times:

- Novoye Vremya (Russian: Новое время, The New Times), a daily newspaper published in Russia from 1868 to 1914
- The New Times (Russian: Новое время), a politically independent magazine published in Russia from 1943
- Nový čas (New Time), a daily Slovak tabloid newspaper
- Novy Chas (Belarusian: Новы час, New Time), an independent weekly Belarusian newspaper

== Other ==
- New Times (album) is an album released in 1994 by Violent Femmes
- New Times (Armenia), an Armenian political party
- New Times (politics), a British intellectual movement of the 1980s
- Nuevo Tiempo (New Times), a South American TV station
- Un Nuevo Tiempo (A New Era), a political party in Venezuela
- Naya Daur (1957 film), or New Times, a 1957 Indian film by B.R. Chopra

== See also ==
- Naya Daur (disambiguation)
- Ny Tid (disambiguation)
