= Crimson Skies (album) =

Studio album by Cloudscape
- Released: June 3, 2006
- Recorded: Recorded at "RoastingHouse studio One"
- Genres: Progressive metal, Power metal
- Length: 62 Minutes
- Labels: Metal Heaven (EU), Nightmare Records (U.S, Canada)
- Producer: Pontus Lindmark

Cloudscape chronology
Cloudscape (2004)	Crimson Skies (2006)	Global Drama (2008)

Professional ratings
Review scores
Source	Rating
Glory Daze Music	9.5/10 stars

Crimson Skies is a 2006 studio album by the Swedish metal band Cloudscape. It is the band's second studio album.

On June 9, 2006 Cloudscape performed at the Sweden Rock Festival to promote Crimson Skies followed by other appearances at clubs and festivals around in Europe. A performance of the song "Demon Tears" was filmed and released as music video to promote the album. On the song "Will We Remain", singer Anette Blyckert appeared as a guest vocalist.

The album received an 8/10 rating in Rock Hard 8.5/10 in Artrock.se and other reviews including Powermetal.de.

== Tracklist ==
No.	Title	Writer(s)	Length
1.	"Shapeshifter"	M. Andersson/R. Landin	04.29
2.	"Shadowland"	B. Eliasson/P. Svärd	05.07
3.	"And Then The Rain..."	B. Eliasson/R. Landin	05.12
4.	"Take The Blame"	M. Andersson	04.39
5.	"The Last Breath"	B. Eliasson/P. Svärd	03.35
6.	"Psychic Imbalance"	M. Andersson	06.12
7.	"Hope"	B. Eliasson/M. Andersson	05.33
8.	"Breach In My Sanity"	B. Eliasson/R. Landin	05.23
9.	"Demon Tears"	M. Andersson/R. Landin	05.34
10.	"1000 Souls"	M. Andersson/R. Landin	04.54
11.	"Someone Else"	B. Eliasson	04.23
12.	"Will We Remain (feat. Anette Olzon)"	M. Andersson	05.24
13.	"You Belong (U.S bonustrack, demo)"	M. Andersson/D. Bengtsson

== Personnel ==
- Mike Andersson - Lead & Backing Vocals
- Björn Eliasson - Guitars (Daniel Pålsson on album)
- Patrik Svärd - Guitars
- Haynes Pherson - Bass & Backing Vocals
- Roger Landin - Drums & Percussion
- Anette Blyckert – guest vocals on "Will We Remain"
