= Albert J. Meyer (accountant) =

Albert J. Meyer was a forensic accountant and investor who is credited with uncovering fraud at the Foundation for New Era Philanthropy, one of the largest ponzi schemes in U.S. history, as well as notable accounting irregularities at several large public companies. Meyer died on February 3, 2022, from lung cancer.

== Career ==
Meyer started his career as a forensic accountant and spent 15 years as an accounting professor, including five years at Spring Arbor University. After leaving academia, Meyer worked as an analyst at Martin Capital Management and at Dallas-based investment manager, David W. Tice & Assoc., Inc. In 2006, he founded Bastiat Capital, a money manager based in Plano, Texas.

== Discoveries ==
Meyer investigated New Era while working as an accounting professor at Spring Arbor University in the mid-1990s. The college was an investor in the foundation. Subsequently, Meyer detected accounting irregularities at Tyco International in 1999, which ultimately led to the conviction and imprisonment of CEO Dennis Kozlowski. He also brought to light accounting issues at Coca-Cola and Enron.
