= Justin David Swibel =

American film director

Justin David Swibel (born April 1, 1983) is an American screenwriter, director, and producer.

In 2006, Swibel made his feature film debut with Modern Man, which was theatrically released in Los Angeles and New York in Winter 2006 through Spring 2007.

Film critic Matt Zoller Seitz of The New York Times wrote, “Mr. Swibel’s style is so assured” and said of the film, “we’re watching a droll parable of mankind at ease after having subdued nature, yet still not feeling in control of it... if you tune into this film’s rhythms, you’ll leave the theater seeing the world with fresh eyes.” In 2007, Zoller Seitz further wrote about Swibel's film in Slant Magazine, dubbing it "heroically inventive...impossible to define with a three-syllable catchphrase."
