= Harry Brown (film) =

2009 film by Daniel Barber

- Theatrical release poster
- Directed by: Daniel Barber
- Written by: Gary Young
- Produced by: Matthew Vaughn; Kris Thykier; Matthew Brown; Keith Bell
- Starring: Michael Caine; Emily Mortimer; Charlie Creed-Miles; David Bradley; Iain Glen; Sean Harris; Ben Drew; Jack O'Connell; Jamie Downey; Liam Cunningham
- Cinematography: Martin Ruhe
- Edited by: Joe Walker
- Music by: Martin Phipps; Ruth Barrett; Pete Tong; Theo Green; Paul Rogers
- Production companies: Marv Partners; UK Film Council; HanWay Films; Prescience Pictures; Framestore Features
- Distributed by: Lionsgate UK
- Release dates: 12 September 2009 (TIFF); 11 November 2009 (United Kingdom)
- Running time: 103 minutes
- Country: United Kingdom
- Language: English
- Budget: $7.3 million
- Box office: $10.4 million

Harry Brown is a 2009 British vigilante film directed by Daniel Barber and starring Michael Caine, Emily Mortimer, Charlie Creed-Miles, David Bradley, Iain Glen, Sean Harris, Ben Drew, Jack O'Connell, Jamie Downey, and Liam Cunningham. The story follows Harry Brown (Caine), a widowed Royal Marines veteran who had served in Northern Ireland during The Troubles, living on a London housing estate that is rapidly descending into youth crime. After a violent gang murders his friend (Bradley), Harry decides to take justice into his own hands.

Drew, commonly known by his stage name Plan B, recorded the film's theme music track "End Credits" with Chase & Status. Harry Brown premiered on 12 September 2009 as a "Special Presentation" at the 2009 Toronto International Film Festival and was released theatrically in the United Kingdom by Lionsgate UK on 11 November 2009, grossing £6,649,562 at the UK box office, before further grosses in other territories for a total of $10.4 million & receiving mixed reviews from critics, with praise for Caine's performance but the film also received criticism for the excessive depiction of violence.

== Plot ==
Harry Brown is an elderly pensioner who is a decorated Royal Marine, and a veteran of the Northern Ireland conflict. He lives on a London council estate ruled by drug dealers and violent youth gangs, while spending most of his time playing chess with his friend, Len Attwell, at a local pub owned by Sid Rourke. When the hospital phones to tell him that his wife, Kath, is dying, Harry is too late to see her because he is scared to take a shortcut through a pedestrian underpass, which is gang-occupied. His wife is laid to rest next to the grave of their thirteen-year-old daughter, Rachel, who died in 1973.

Len confides to Harry that he is being terrorized by young hoodlums, and shows him an old bayonet he now carries to defend himself; with the police unable to help, he plans to confront his harassers himself. The next day, Harry is visited by Detective Inspector Alice Frampton and Detective Sergeant Terry Hicock, who tell him that Len has been murdered. The police arrest Noel Winters, the leader of a drug-dealing gang, along with members Carl, Dean, and Marky, but they are released due to lack of evidence. Harry gets drunk after Len's funeral, but on his way home, Dean attempts to rob him at knife-point. Harry's military training reasserts itself, and he kills Dean with his own knife. Frampton visits Harry in the morning to inform him that because Len was killed with his own bayonet, any charges could be reduced to manslaughter on the basis of self-defence, which infuriates Harry.

Harry follows a drug dealer, Kenny, to a den where he negotiates the purchase of a pistol. Inside, Harry finds Kenny and his associate, Stretch, growing cannabis and sexually abusing an overdosing girl to make pornographic films. Harry kills the dealers before burning down their den, fleeing with the girl and a bag of firearms. He leaves the girl outside a hospital, and then follows Marky, killing a drug dealer who is sexually abusing him. He then tortures Marky into revealing some mobile phone camera footage of Len's murder. Harry uses Marky to bait Noel and Carl into a gunfight in the underpass; Carl and Marky are killed, and Noel flees with Harry in pursuit, only for Harry to collapse from an emphysema attack. Harry is found and taken to hospital.

Frampton has deduced that Harry is behind all the recent shootings, but her boss—Superintendent Childs—is instead convinced that they are all part of an escalating gang war. Childs orders a major police operation on the estate, which results in a riot. Harry discharges himself from the hospital to find Noel.

Driving onto the estate to stop Harry, Frampton and Hicock are involved in a car crash in which Hicock is severely injured. Harry rescues them and takes them to Sid's pub, where Frampton warns Harry that Sid is actually Noel's uncle. Harry discovers that Sid has been hiding Noel, but his guard drops due to another emphysema attack, allowing Sid to disarm him and reveal himself to be the gang's real leader. Frampton tries to call for backup but is stopped by Noel, who begins to strangle her after Sid suffocates Hicock to death. Though weakened, Harry draws a concealed revolver and kills Noel; Sid prepares to kill Harry in retaliation only to be shot dead by police snipers, who have responded to Frampton's call.

At a press conference after the riot, Superintendent Childs announces that Frampton and Hicock are to be given awards (the latter posthumously), but stresses there is no evidence a vigilante was involved in the case. Harry is then seen walking towards the underpass, which is now quiet and gang-free.

== Cast ==
- Michael Caine as Harold "Harry" Brown
- Emily Mortimer as Detective Inspector Alice Frampton
- Charlie Creed Miles as Detective Sergeant Terence "Terry" Hicock
- David Bradley as Leonard "Len" Attwell
- Ben Drew as Noel Winters
- Sean Harris as Stretch
- Jack O'Connell as Marky
- Jamie Downey as Carl
- Lee Oakes as Dean Saunders
- Joe Gilgun as Kenneth "Kenny" Soames
- Liam Cunningham as Sidney "Sid" Rourke
- Iain Glen as Superintendent Childs
- Klariza Clayton as Sharon "Shaz" Thompson
- Liz Daniels as Katherine "Kath" Brown
- Orla O'Rourke as Nurse # 2
- Chris Wilson as Daniel Ladlow Assistant Chief Constable
- Ashley McGuire as Community WPC
- Charles Ramsay as Officer Charlie Ramsay

== Production ==
The film was shot mainly in and around the abandoned Heygate Estate in Walworth, London. At the time of filming which took place in November 2008, it was due to be demolished but did not happen until early 2014. The subway scenes were shot at Marks Gate, London.

== Reception ==
On Rotten Tomatoes, 63% of critics have given the film a positive review based on 127 reviews, with an average score of 6/10 as well as a 7.2/10 score on IMDB based on 95,000 user reviews. The website's critical consensus states, "Its lurid violence may put off some viewers, but Harry Brown is a vigilante thriller that carries an emotional as well as a physical punch, thanks to a gripping performance from Michael Caine in the title role". On Metacritic, it has a score of 55 out of 100 based on reviews from 35 critics. Empire gave the film four stars out of five. GQ magazine gave it five stars out of five, calling it "truly awesome".

The Times gave the film three stars but considered it "morally and politically odious". The Sunday Times was less positive, giving it one star: "It's too daft to pass muster as action-movie hokum, let alone as social commentary". Cinema Blend praised the film, saying: "Caine pours every ounce of himself into Harry, and the payoff is massive ... There's nothing more fulfilling than seeing a compelling story brought to life by standout performances and then further enhanced by stellar directing". Roger Ebert of the Chicago Sun-Times gave the film three stars out of four, and called the film "... a revenge thriller poised somewhere between Death Wish and Gran Torino". As of 20 December 2009 the film had earned $6,649,562 in the UK market opening against 2012 and Disney's A Christmas Carol. As of 8 August 2010, total worldwide gross was nearly $10 million including $1,818,681 in the United States, where it was released on April 30, 2010 by Samuel Goldwyn Films and Destination Films on a limited run before opening wide 2 weeks later on May 14, which saw it open against the 2010 remake of A Nightmare on Elm Street (1984).
