= New Era (ship) =

Three ships have been named New Era:

- USS New Era, launched in 1862, was a steamer used by the Union Navy during the American Civil War as a gunboat in support of the Union Navy blockade of Confederate waterways.
- USS Essex (1856), launched in 1856 as New Era, was an ironclad gunboat during the American Civil War. Before the United States Army upgraded and renamed her in 1861, she was a timberclad gunboat called USS New Era.
- New Era (1854 ship), launched and wrecked in 1854

== See also ==
- New Era (disambiguation) – for other uses of New Era
