= New Era (Cloudscape album) =

Studio album by Cloudscape
- Released: 27 July 2012
- Recorded: Recorded at "RoastingHouse studio One"
- Genre: Progressive metal, Power metal
- Length: 58 Minutes
- Label: Dead End Exit (EU); Nightmare Records (U.S, Canada)
- Producer: Theo Theander

Cloudscape chronology
Global Drama (2008)	New Era (2012)	Touring Europe With A Blast From The Past (2014)

Professional ratings
Review scores
Source	Rating
Imhotep	5/6 stars
Stormbringer	4/5 stars

New Era is a 2012 studio album by the Swedish metal band Cloudscape. It is the first album to feature the band's new lineup: Fredrik Joakimsson (drums), Håkan Nyander (bass) and Stefan Rosqvist (guitar). Two music videos (Your Desire and Before Your Eyes) were released to promote New Era. On the song "Share Your Energy", drummer Peter Wildoer guests on growls.

No.	Title	Writer(s)	Length
1.	"Silver Ending"	M. Andersson/R. Landin	05.30
2.	"Share Your Energy"	F. Joakimsson/M. Andersson	03.38
3.	"Kingdom Of Sand"	M. Andersson/P. Svärd	03.47
4.	"Pull The Brake"	F. Joakimsson/M. Andersson	04.35
5.	"Seen It All Before"	M. Andersson	06.40
6.	"Your Desire"	F. Joakimsson/M. Andersson	05.41
7.	"Voyager 9"	F. Joakimsson/P. Svärd	08.37
8.	"Simplicity...huh..."	M. Andersson	03.44
9.	"Before Your Eyes"	M. Andersson	05.41
10.	"Violet Eve"	F. Joakimsson/M. Andersson	05.05
11.	"Into The Unknown"	F. Joakimsson/P. Svärd	04.55
12.	"Heroes"	M. Andersson/R. Landin, M. Andersson	04.30

== Personnel ==
- Mike Andersson - Lead & Backing Vocals
- Stefan Rosqvist - Guitars (Daniel Pålsson on album)
- Patrik Svärd - Guitars
- Håkan Nyander - Bass & Backing Vocals
- Fredrik Joakimsson - Drums & Percussion
