= Modern Times =

Modern Times may refer to modern history.

Modern Times may also refer to:

== Music ==
- Modern Times (band), a band from Luxembourg
- Modern Times (Al Stewart album), a 1975 album by Al Stewart
- Modern Times (Bob Dylan album), a 2006 album by Bob Dylan
- Modern Times (IU album), a 2013 Korean album by South Korean singer IU
- Modern Times (Jefferson Starship album), a 1981 album by Jefferson Starship
- Modern Times (Johnny Paycheck), a 1987 album by Johnny Paycheck
- Modern Times (Latin Quarter album), a 1985 album by Latin Quarter
- Modern Times (Steps Ahead album), 1984
- "Modern Times" (song), a 2004 song by J-five
- "Modern Times", a 1983 song by Prism from the album Beat Street
- "Modern Times", a song by Mika from the 2026 album Hyperlove
- In Modern Times, a 2001 album by Spyro Gyra

== Other media ==
- Modern Times (film), a 1936 Charlie Chaplin film
- Modern Times (novel) (Wenming Xiaoshi), a 1903 Chinese novel
- Modern Times: A History of the World from the 1920s to the 1980s, a 1984 book by Paul Johnson
- Modern Times: Photography in the 20th Century, an exhibition held in winter 2014–2015 at the Rijksmuseum, Amsterdam
- Modern Times Group, a Swedish media company
- Les Temps modernes, a French journal
- Modern Times, 2019 book by Joan Mellen

== Other uses ==
- Tiempos Modernos, a Mexican political group that is part of the National Assembly of the Socialist Left
- Utopian Community of Modern Times, an anarchist individualist community in 19th-century New York state

== See also ==
- Early modern period
- Modernity
- Modern (disambiguation)
- Contemporary (disambiguation)
- Ny Tid (disambiguation)
