= IOOF Building (Maquoketa, Iowa) =

- U.S. National Register of Historic Places
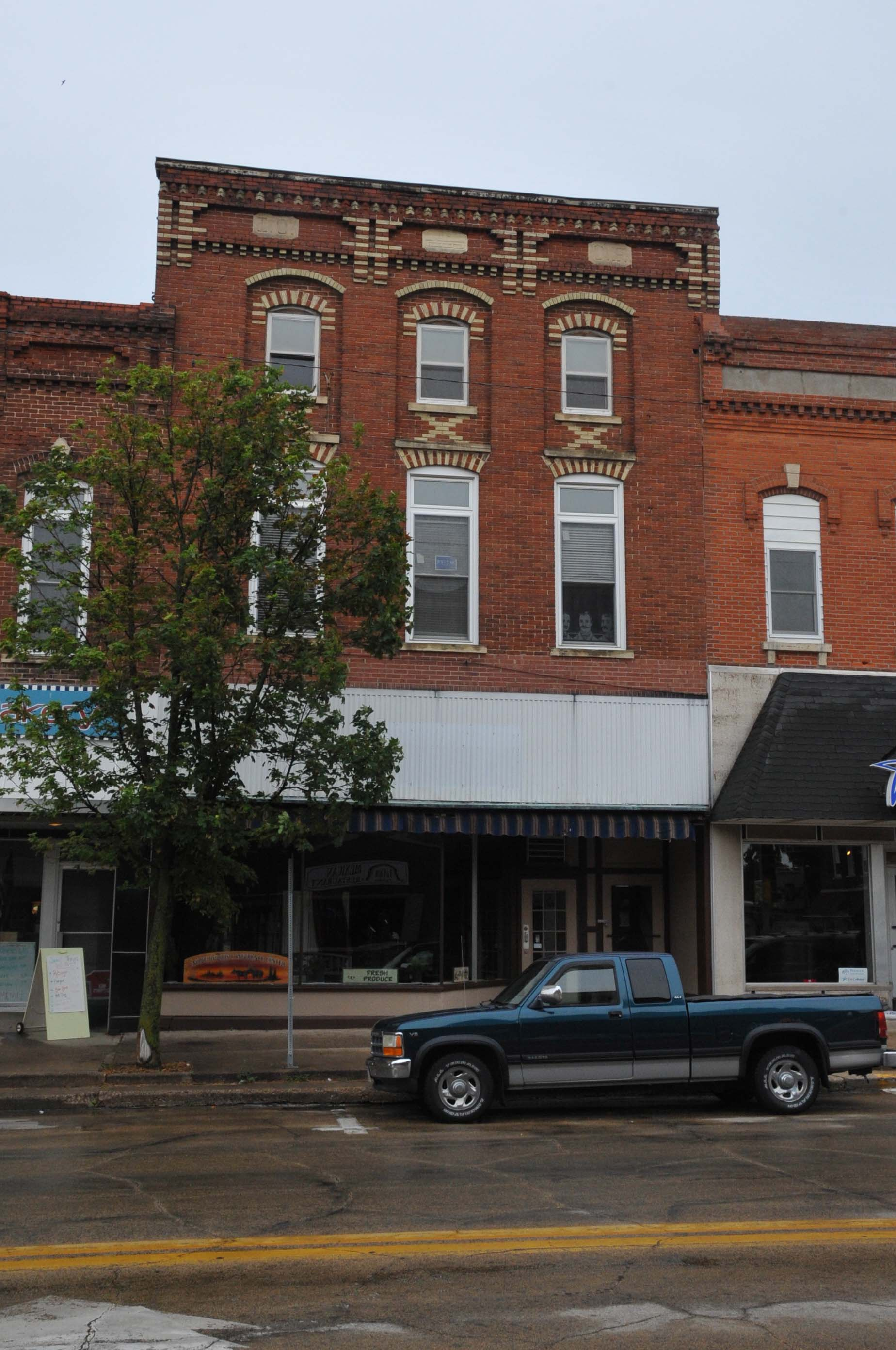

- Location within Iowa Location within the United States
- Location: 103 N. Main; Maquoketa, Iowa
- Coordinates: 42°4′9″N 90°39′54″W
- Area: less than one acre
- Built: 1886
- Architect: Warren, Smith; Lake, John
- Architectural style: Late Victorian
- MPS: Maquoketa MPS
- NRHP reference No.: 89002110
- Added to NRHP: August 9, 1991

The IOOF Building is a historic building located in Maquoketa, Iowa, United States. Built in 1886, it is a three-story, Late Victorian, brick structure. It is one of several buildings in the central business district that utilizes brick as the primary decorative material. What makes this one unusual is the decorative use of light cream colored brick around the windows, between the second and third floors, and in the cornice. The basement of the building has been used for a barber shop, the main level has housed various retail businesses, and the upper floors are used by the Independent Order of Odd Fellows for their clubhouse. The building was listed on the National Register of Historic Places in 1991.
