= Modern World =

Modern World or The Modern World may refer to:

- Modern World (magazine), originally Modern Wonder, a 1937–1941 British magazine for boys
- The Modern World, a late-1970s British music fanzine published by Gary Crowley
- The Modern World (novel), a 2007 novel by Steph Swainston
- This Modern World, a comic strip by Tom Tomorrow
- "The Modern World" (song), by the Jam, 1977
- "Modern World", a song by Anouk from Who's Your Momma, 2007
- "Modern World", a song by Wolf Parade from Apologies to the Queen Mary, 2005
- Aaj Ki Duniya (lit. 'Modern World'), a 1940 Indian film by G. P. Pawar
- Aaj Ka Daur (lit. 'Modern era'), a 1985 Indian Hindi-language film

== See also ==
- Modern history, the period from about 1500 to the present
- Modernity, a topic in the humanities and social sciences
- This Modern World, a weekly satirical comic strip by Tom Tomorrow
- This Modern World (album), by Stan Kenton, 1953
