= New Age (disambiguation) =

New Age is a term applied to a range of spiritual or religious beliefs and practices.

New Age or The New Age may also refer to:

== Music ==
- New-age music, a genre of music intended to create artistic inspiration, relaxation, and optimism
- The New Age (album), a 1973 album by Canned Heat
- New Age (Eddy Lover album) (2011)
- New Age (KSI and Randolph album), a 2019 album by KSI and Randolph, or the title song
- "New Age" (Marlon Roudette song) (2011)
- "New Age" (The Velvet Underground song) (1969)
- The New Age, a music group featuring Pat Kilroy

== Publications ==
- The New Age, a British literary magazine 1894–1938
- New Age (Bangladesh), an English-language daily newspaper
- The New Age (Chicago), an American Norwegian–Danish-language newspaper formerly known as Social-Demokraten
- New Age (South African newspaper), a leftist newspaper (1953–1962)
- The New Age (South African newspaper), a daily newspaper (2010–2018)
- New Age Journal, a health and lifestyle magazine renamed Body & Soul
- New Age Weekly, the organ of the Communist Party of India

== Other uses ==
- The New Age (film), a 1994 film by Michael Tolkin
- The New Age, a book series by Hugh Hood

== See also ==
- New Age communities, places with significant numbers of people with New Age beliefs
- New Age travellers, New Age and hippie believers who travel between music festivals and fairs
- New Era (disambiguation)
- New Wave (disambiguation)
- Old Age (disambiguation)
