= Cloudscape (band) =

Swedish melodic metal band

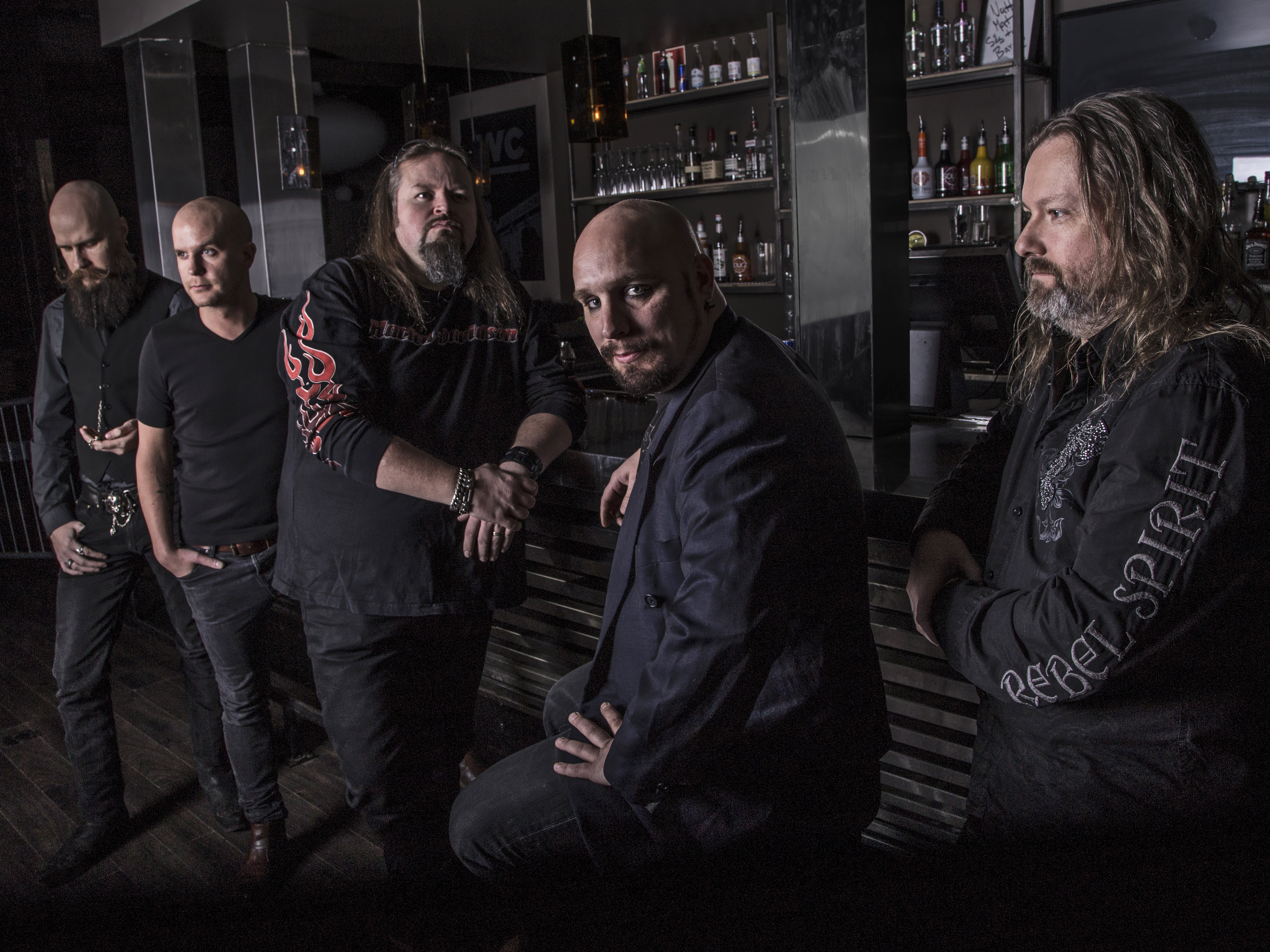
- Cloudscape

Background information
- Origin: Helsingborg, Sweden
- Genres: Progressive Metal, Power Metal
- Years active: 2001–present
- Labels: Dead End Exit Records (EU, 2012–present); Nightmare Records (US, 2006–present); Metal Heaven (EU, 2004–07); Marquee/Avalon (Asia, 2004–05); Goldencore Records (EU, 2008–09)
- Members: Mike Andersson; Patrik Svärd; Håkan Nyander; Fredrik Joakimsson; Stefan Rosqvist
- Past members: Haynes Pherson; Roger Landin; Björn Eliasson; Daniel Pålsson
- Website: cloudscape.se

Cloudscape is a melodic metal band from Helsingborg, Sweden. They have performed live at festivals such as ProgPower Europe, Sweden Rock Festival, ProgPower UK, and Bloodstock Open Air and in 2014 they did a 3½ week long European Tour. As of May 2015, Cloudscape have released four full-length albums, six music videos and a limited "Best Of" album (2014).

== History ==
=== 2001 – 2005 ===
Cloudscape was formed in Helsingborg, Sweden in 2001 by Mike Andersson (lead vocals), Björn Eliasson (guitar), Patrik Svärd (guitar), Haynes Pherson (bass) and Roger Landin (drums). In 2002, the signed with RoastingHouse Music, and in April 2004 they recorded their debut album Cloudscape in the RoastingHouse Studio One. Danish guitarist Torben Enevoldsen appeared as a guest soloist in the album's opening track, "As the Light Leads the Way." In fall 2004 Cloudscape filmed their first music video (Under Fire) to promote their music on the web and in different media channels. Cloudscape was released in Sweden by RoastingHouse, in Germany by Metal Heaven, and in Asia by Marquee/Avalon. In October 2005, Cloudscape performed at ProgPower Europe in Baarlo, Netherlands, their first international appearance.

=== 2006 – 2007 ===
In December 2005 Cloudscape returned to the studio to record their second album entitled Crimson Skies. This album features ex Nightwish singer Anette Olzon (credited as Anette Blyckert) on guest vocals on the song "Will We Remain." The song "Demon Tears" was filmed for a music video by director Rainer Holmgren (who also filmed the video for "Under Fire"). Crimson Skies was released via Metal Heaven in Europe on 3 June 2006, and by US label Nightmare Records. The release of Crimson Skies was celebrated with a 45-minute live show at the Sweden Rock Festival on 9 June 2006. Cloudscape also traveled to the UK to perform at ProgPower UK in 2007.

=== 2008 – 2010 ===
The third album by Cloudscape is entitled Global Drama, recorded at RoastingHouse in fall 2007. This album marks a label change for the European territory to German metal label Goldencore. Global Drama was released in Europe on 18 August 2008 and a month later in the U.S via Nightmare Records. Two videos were filmed for this album ("Cloak & Daggers" and "Darkest Legacy"). The opening track, "Mind Diary", was released as download for the video game Rock Band 3. Cloudscape performed at Bloodstock Open Air in support of Global Drama.

Global Drama was the last album to feature founding members Bjorn Eliasson, Roger Landin and Haynes Pherson. All three left the band between 2009 and 2010, citing personal reasons. Remaining members Andersson and Svärd recruited drummer Fredrik Joakimsson, bassist Håkan Nyander and guitarist Daniel Pålsson to rebuild the band.

=== 2011 – 2013 ===
During summer of 2011, Cloudscape recorded their fourth album, New Era. Two videos were filmed as well ("Your Desire" and "Before Your Eyes"). A new licensing deal for the European territory was signed with Swedish record label Dead End Exit Records. Drummer Peter Wildoer (Darkane, James LaBrie) guests on growl on the song "Share Your Energy". However, just a few months prior to the release, guitarist Pålsson left the band and was replaced by Stefan Rosqvist who is featured as the band's guitarist on New Era credits even thou it was Pålsson who recorded the actual guitars on the album.

=== 2014 ===
In late February to mid March 2014, Cloudscape undertook a 3½ week European tour performing live in 16 cities with Danish band Royal Hunt. A limited compilation album entitled Touring Europe with a Blast From The Past was released via Dead End Exit Records to promote Cloudscape on tour.

== Members ==
=== Current members ===
- Mike Andersson – Vocals (2001–present)
- Stefan Rosqvist – Guitar (2012–present)
- Patrik Svärd – Guitar (2001–present)
- Håkan Nyander – Bass guitar (2009–present)
- Fredrik Joakimsson – Drums (2009–present)

=== Past members ===
- Haynes Pherson – Bass guitar and backing vocals (2001–2009)
- Roger Landin – Drums (2001–2009)
- Björn Eliasson – Guitar (2001–2010)
- Daniel Pålsson – Guitar (2010–2012)

== Discography ==
=== Albums ===
- Cloudscape (2004)
- Crimson Skies (2006)
- Global Drama (2008)
- New Era (2012)
- Touring Europe with a Blast From The Past (2014)
- Voice of Reason (2016)
