= The Modern =

The Modern could be

- The Modern (band), a British Electropop band formerly called Matinée Club
- The Modern (building complex), a twin tower complex in Fort Lee, New Jersey
- The Modern (restaurant), a Danny Meyer restaurant in the Museum of Modern Art in New York City
- The Modern Art Museum of Fort Worth, referred to colloquially as "The Modern"
- The Modern (Seattle building), a high-rise building in Seattle, Washington
