= Foundation for New Era Philanthropy =

Ponzi scheme

The Foundation for New Era Philanthropy was a Ponzi scheme that operated from 1989 until its collapse in 1995 after having raised over $500 million from 1100 donors and embezzling $135 million of this. Most of the money was stolen from Christian religious organizations and charities in the Philadelphia, Pennsylvania area. The scheme was publicly discovered by Albert Meyer, an accounting teacher at Spring Arbor College and the auditing firm Coopers & Lybrand working with its client, a local religious college in Los Angeles.

== Origin ==
The Foundation was founded by John G. Bennett Jr., a prominent Christian businessman from the Philadelphia area who had previously run a variety of different entities, including some Pennsylvania state drug education centers and a corporate training business.

In 1989, Bennett invited several Christian friends to become "beneficiary donors" in a new organization he was founding. They were told that if they contributed at least $5,000 for three months, he would double it. He explained that he had identified secret donors who would match charitable contributions raised by his friends. So rather than donating $5,000 to charity, a sponsor gave the money to New Era Philanthropy for three months, then he or she could donate $10,000.

His friends obliged by giving him various amounts, which Bennett used to pay his bills. He was able to pay them their doubled funds in January 1990 by tapping a payment made to a consulting business he ran on the side. This was the last "real" income paid to investors. To have funds ready to pay off the climbing number of deposits, he increased the minimum "contribution" to $25,000 and lengthened the minimum waiting period. Different donors were told different things; over time the waiting period grew from six to nine to ten months. The number of anonymous donors, anonymous benefactors, and anonymous philanthropists also varied, though Bennett eventually settled on claiming to have nine of them.

John M. Templeton, Jr., son of John Templeton, Sr., the famous investor and philanthropist, was a friend of Bennett, and people believed that he was one of the anonymous donors. In addition, Prudential Securities was a prominent part of the setup (and became the subject of a $90 million lawsuit accusing them of complicity).

In 1994, Bennett expanded the program to allow "donations" by nonprofit organizations.

The program remained small until 1993, when the Philadelphia Academy of Natural Sciences asked for a quarter-million dollar match. After successfully completing that match, many major organizations such as the Philadelphia Public Library and the University of Pennsylvania joined, along with churches and other Christian organizations. Like most modern pyramid or Ponzi schemes, Bennett's was an "affinity" scheme, in which he defrauded people of common interest: in this case, local nonprofit organizations and Christian charities. Using the swelling funds from these churches, Bennett expanded further, establishing offices in Radnor, Pennsylvania. He had glossy brochures and a staff to process all the money coming in.

He expanded his sales force by encouraging organizations to take a "finder's fee" of 10% from any money they raised. In other words, if a representative could convince donors to give $10,000,000, the agent could keep $1,000,000 for himself, give the remaining $9,000,000 to New Era and get back $18,000,000 for the nonprofit in six months. And to further increase inflows, in 1993 Bennett started allowing the organizations to donate to themselves, often out of their endowment funds. The directors of the charities who handed over their endowments to New Era were then rewarded with finder's fees.

By and large his donors did not ask many questions. When they wanted proof that the money they donated was not being stolen, he provided evidence that the Foundation owned government bonds. However, he was showing the same bonds to everybody, and they had been pledged as collateral on loans anyway. He also had prospective participants speak with supposed representatives of Prudential Bache Securities. Later review showed that the Foundation's tax returns, which had always been publicly available, did not reflect the numerous funds supposedly held by New Era. New Era used a small one-man CPA firm; later review by Coopers & Lybrand identified erroneous financial opinions by this firm as potential red flags.

Bennett told prospects that his anonymous donors met several times a year, in person or by phone. Former U.S. Treasury Secretary William E. Simon asked to be admitted to the donor panel. Bennett never responded to the request and Simon gave him money anyway.

With the cash flowing through his hands, Bennett made all sorts of private investments. He bought a share of a travel agency and ran all of New Era's travel business through it. He also purchased a publishing house and other businesses.

In early 1995, the Foundation for New Era Philanthropy was receiving praise in the press for giving money to religious organizations and involving high school students in charitable events. However, the end came swiftly.

On May 15, 1995, a skeptical article about the Foundation appeared on the front page of The Wall Street Journal. The same day, the Foundation capitulated in the face of a lawsuit demanding repayment of a $44,000,000 loan and filed for Chapter 11 bankruptcy protection. In filing, the foundation stated that its assets were worth $80 million with liabilities of $551 million.

A close examination of the documents filed in the subsequent lawsuits reveals that more than $354 million had passed through New Era's hands and that Bennett had taken $8 million of that for himself.

In the end, by liquidating all of Bennett's personal assets and reclaiming funds that had been paid to earlier participants, the court was able to bring the total loss down to $135,000,000, spread among all participants in the scheme. All participants in the scheme, including ones who had previously left it, were required to give the money back for repayment across all investors.

Bennett faced 82 federal counts of money laundering and wire, mail and bank fraud. He planned to claim in his defense that he had been possessed by "religious fervor", but the judge did not allow this. In the end, Bennett pleaded no contest to all the charges in March 1997. Though federal sentencing guidelines indicated a sentence of 22 to 27 years, the judge gave him 12. He spent ten years at Ft. Dix Federal Correctional Institute before being released to a halfway house on September 11, 2007. He remained there until March 2008.

The scandal touched 1,100 individuals and charities, including more than 180 evangelical groups, colleges, and seminaries. A partial list appears below.

== Reasons for collapse ==
Bennett's scheme collapsed because of an investigation headed by Mary Beth Osborn, head of the Charitable Trust Section of the Pennsylvania Attorney General's office. She had received a letter in 1993 from a suspicious whistleblower within New Era. Her inquiry eventually resulted in New Era's registry with the IRS.

As Bennett started to disclose greater financial details, New Era came to the attention of Albert Meyer, a Spring Arbor University accounting professor, whose institution in Michigan had been drawn into the matching scheme. Meyer's research indicated that the Foundation was a scam, but Spring Arbor College successfully collected on its early investment. College officials told Meyer that he was going to endanger their ability to get matching grants if his investigation continued. While the college continued investment in New Era, Meyer alerted federal investigators and The Wall Street Journal that New Era had all the features of a pyramid scam. After New Era collapsed, the president of Spring Arbor College called Meyer to apologize.

== Partial list of investors ==
=== Charities ===
Per MinistryWatch, "the list of ministries involved with New Era... read like a Who’s Who of evangelical organizations."

According to the Pennsylvania Attorney General's complaint, prominent victimized charities (listed without dollar amounts) included the Boy Scouts of America, the Environmental Defense Fund, Haverford College, Harvard University, Princeton University, The Nature Conservancy, One to One Partnership Inc., Planned Parenthood, the Philadelphia Orchestra, Stanford University Medical School, the United Way and Yale Law School. Some of the organizations with known involvement amounts included (in alphabetical order):

- Academy of Natural Sciences, Philadelphia, Pennsylvania, $2.7 million
- Biblical Theological Seminary, Hatfield, Pennsylvania, $5.8 million
- CB International, Wheaton, Illinois, $4.6 million
- Covenant College, Lookout Mountain, Georgia, $5 million
- Detroit Institute of Arts, Detroit, Michigan, $4 million
- Houghton College, Houghton, New York, $4 million
- John Brown University, Siloam Springs, Arkansas, $4 million
- International Missions, Reading, Pennsylvania., $5 million
- International Teams, Prospects Heights, Illinois., $5 million
- King College, Bristol, Tennessee., $5 million
- Spring Arbor College, Spring Arbor, Michigan, $1.5 million
- United World Mission, $1.45 million
- University of Pennsylvania, $2.1 million
- Wheaton College, Wheaton, Illinois, $4.6 million

=== Donors ===
- George F. Bennett Jr., Boston, $3.3 million
- Peter Ochs, ( address unknown ), $3.2 million
- Buford Television Inc., Dallas, $3 million
- Henry F. Harris, Wyndmoor, Pa., $3 million
- Westwood Endowment, Indianapolis, $2.8 million (less than $280,000)
- Don Soderquist, Rogers, Ark., $2.8 million
- William Kanaga, Orleans, Mass., $2.4 million
- Henry W. Longacre, Souderton, Pa., $2 million
- Whitehead Foundation, New York, $2 million (about $1 million)
- Amelior Foundation, Morristown, N.J., $1.9 million

== Other sources of information ==
- PA State Government Report
- Lessons From New Era, Oct 1, 1998
- Prudential Securities lawsuit announced
- United Methodist News Service, March 31, 1997
- United Methodist News Service, September 5, 1996
- Christianity Today, October 27, 1997
- Philadelphia Inquirer January 6, 1998
- Washington Post May 18, 1995
