= Modern Man (film) =

Modern Man is a 2006 experimental drama about one man’s isolation and search for meaning. The film was directed, edited and photographed by Justin Swibel.

== Plot ==
The story takes place almost completely outdoors on a large estate. A man in his twenties inhabits the area, going about his daily upkeep of the property. In the final sequence, the young man plays piano, looks in a mirror with an air of satisfaction and showers with his clothes on.

== Public exhibition ==
The film opened December 1, 2006 at Laemmle's Sunset 5 theater in Los Angeles, CA. The film opened April 13, 2007 in New York City at City Cinemas' Village East theater.

== Production ==
The film features a soundscape created by sound designer Sean Garnhart (Ice Age, Robots). No production audio was recorded; the sound was created completely in post production using ADR, Foley, and location audio recording.
