= ProgPower UK =

- Genre: Progressive metal Power metal
- Dates: March
- Locations: Cheltenham, England; Bristol, England
- Years active: 2006–2008
- Website: progpoweruk.com

ProgPower UK was a progressive and power metal festival held annually in the United Kingdom in 2006 and 2007. The 2008 edition, which would have taken place in the Anson Rooms at the University of Bristol on 28 March – 29 March 2008, headlined by Evergrey and Vanden Plas, was cancelled due to financial difficulties.

== History ==
ProgPower UK was a one-day event for the two years of its existence (although a smaller pre-show party was held each year the day before the main festival) and planned on expanding to a two-day event in 2008. It began in 2006, and was held in Cheltenham at The Centaur, a large modern venue on the grounds of Cheltenham Racecourse. The festival returned to The Centaur in 2007 but for its third year it had planned on moving to the Anson Rooms at the University of Bristol. The move coincided with the expansion of the festival from one to two days, with both days to be held at the same venue. The official website states that the 2008 ProgPower Festival has been cancelled due to financial difficulties.

== Lineups ==
year	location	Friday	Saturday
2008	Cancelled, to be held in the Anson Rooms at the University of Bristol, UK	28 March: Vanden Plas (Germany); Circus Maximus (Norway); Andromeda (Sweden); Thy Majestie (Italy)	29 March: Evergrey (Sweden); Brainstorm (Germany); Thunderstone (Finland); Diablo Swing Orchestra (Sweden); Power Quest (UK); Voyager (Australia); Serenity (Austria)
2007	The Centaur, Cheltenham UK		31 March: Jon Oliva's Pain (United States); Kamelot (United States); Leaves' Eyes (Germany); Communic (Norway); Haggard (Germany); Dreamscape (Germany); Cloudscape (Sweden); Heed (Sweden)
2006	The Centaur, Cheltenham UK		25 March: Therion (Sweden); Threshold (UK); Pagan's Mind (Norway); Freedom Call (Germany); Orphaned Land (Israel); Secret Sphere (Italy); Firewind (Greece)
