= Cloudscape (album) =

Studio album by Cloudscape
- Released: December 16, 2004
- Recorded: May–June 2004 at "Roasting House" studio
- Genres: Progressive metal, Power metal
- Length: 57:56
- Label: Metal Heaven
- Producers: Anders Theander, Pontus Lindmark

Cloudscape chronology
Cloudscape (2004)	Crimson Skies (2006)

Professional ratings
Review scores
Source	Rating
Rock Report	5/6 stars

Cloudscape is the self-titled debut album by Swedish progressive metal band Cloudscape, released through Metal Heaven in 2004. Guitarplayer Torben Enevoldsen (Section A, Fate) guests on guitar solo on the outro of the opening track As The Light Leads The Way.

== Track listing ==
All songs are written by Mike Andersson & Björn Eliasson.

1. As the Light Leads the Way – 4:42
2. Under Fire - 5:27
3. Aqua 275 - 4:11
4. Witching Hour - 5:00
5. In These Walls - 5:35
6. Out of the Shadows - 5:07
7. Everyday is Up to You - 4:00
8. Dawn of Fury - 4:37
9. Slave - 5:33
10. The Presence of Spirits - 4:31
11. Scream - 4:15
12. Losing Faith - 4:58
13. Inferno (Japanese bonus track)

== Personnel ==
- Mike Andersson - Lead & Backing Vocals
- Björn Eliasson - Guitars
- Patrik Svärd - Guitars
- Haynes Pherson - Bass & Backing Vocals
- Roger Landin - Drums & Percussion

Torben Enevoldsen - Guest guitar solo on Track 1
