= Modern agriculture =

Modern agriculture may refer to a range of different agricultural systems, including:

- Agribusiness
- Intensive farming
- Organic farming
- Precision agriculture
- Sustainable agriculture
