= Charles Ramsay (stuntman) =

British stuntman and actor

- Other names: Charlie Ramsay, Charlie Ramsey
- Occupations: Stunt performer, stunt double, actor
- Website: www.charlesramsay.co.uk

Charles Ramsay is a British stuntman, stunt performer and stunt double and actor for film and television. He has performed in stunt sequences in movies such as Sherlock Holmes and Prince of Persia: The Sands of Time.

== Stunt filmography ==
Year	Film	Role
2000	Waking the Dead	stunt performer
2005	Hotel Babylon - TV movie	stunt performer
2007	Boy A	stunt performer - as Charlie Ramsey
2008	Ten Dead Men	stunt performer
2009	Sherlock Holmes	stunt performer
2009	Heartless	stunt double
2009	The Damned United	utility stunts
2010	Gulliver's Travels	stunt double
2010	Harry Potter and the Deathly Hallows	stunt performer
2010	Baseline	stunts
2010	Prince of Persia: The Sands of Time	stunt performer

== Actor filmography ==
Year	Film	Role
2009	Harry Brown	Police (as Charlie Ramsay)
2011	Warriorness	The Falonex Commander
