= New Era (automobile company) =

Defunct American motor vehicle manufacturer

Overview
- Type: Runabout
- Manufacturer: Automobile & Marine Power Company
- Production: 1901–1902

Body and chassis
- Body style: Runabout

Powertrain
- Engine: single-cylinder 7bhp
- Transmission: double chain

Dimensions
- Curb weight: 431 kg (950 lb)

In 1901, in Camden, New Jersey, the Automobile and Marine Power Company decided to move from just producing engines to building whole cars. The New Era was basic, with the engine underneath the seat, tiller steering, and a side crank. Base price was $700, but with options the price was raised to $850. The New Era ceased production in 1902.
