= New Era Building (Maquoketa, Iowa) =

- U.S. National Register of Historic Places
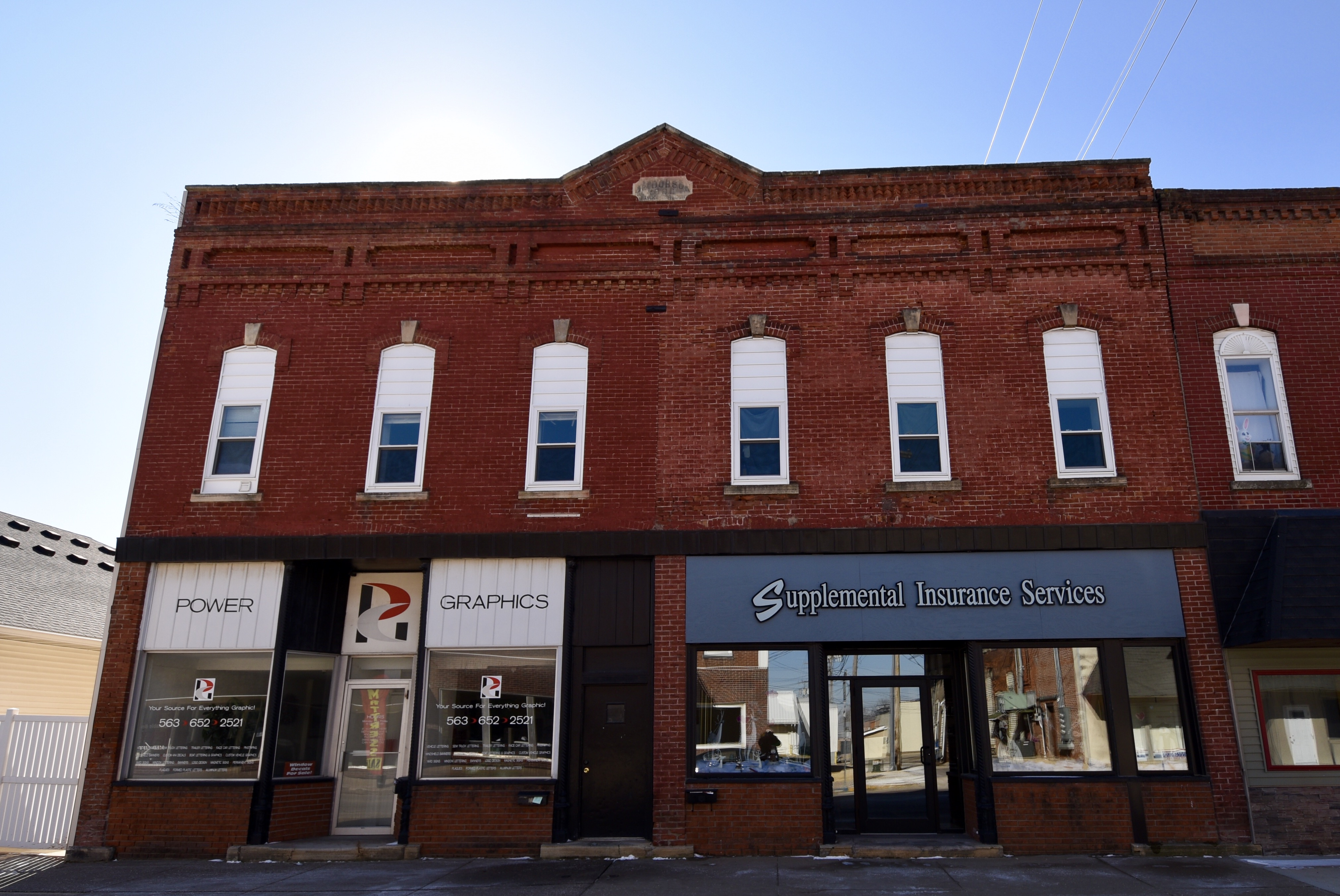

- Location within Iowa Location within the United States
- Location: 115--117 E. Platt; Maquoketa, Iowa
- Coordinates: 42°4′8″N 90°39′53″W
- Area: less than one acre
- Built: 1890
- Built by: John Lake
- Architectural style: Late Victorian
- MPS: Maquoketa MPS
- NRHP reference No.: 89002103
- Added to NRHP: August 09, 1991

The New Era Building, also known as the Dobson Town Clock Building, is a commercial building located in Maquoketa, Iowa. The Late Victorian structure was designed by John Lake and built in 1890. The building was owned by Dr. A.B. Dobson, a "clairvoyant physician who treated patients by mail." Patients were asked to send one dollar and a lock of hair, which would enable him to cure their ills. The building's clock tower was built separately and was removed for scrap to help in the war effort during World War II.
