= Charles G. Ramsey =

American newspaper publisher

Charles G. Ramsey (ca. 1821–1887) was a newspaper publisher who came to St. Louis, Missouri, in 1836 and in 1840 established the city's first daily newspaper, the New Era, with Nathaniel Paschall and published it for about ten years.

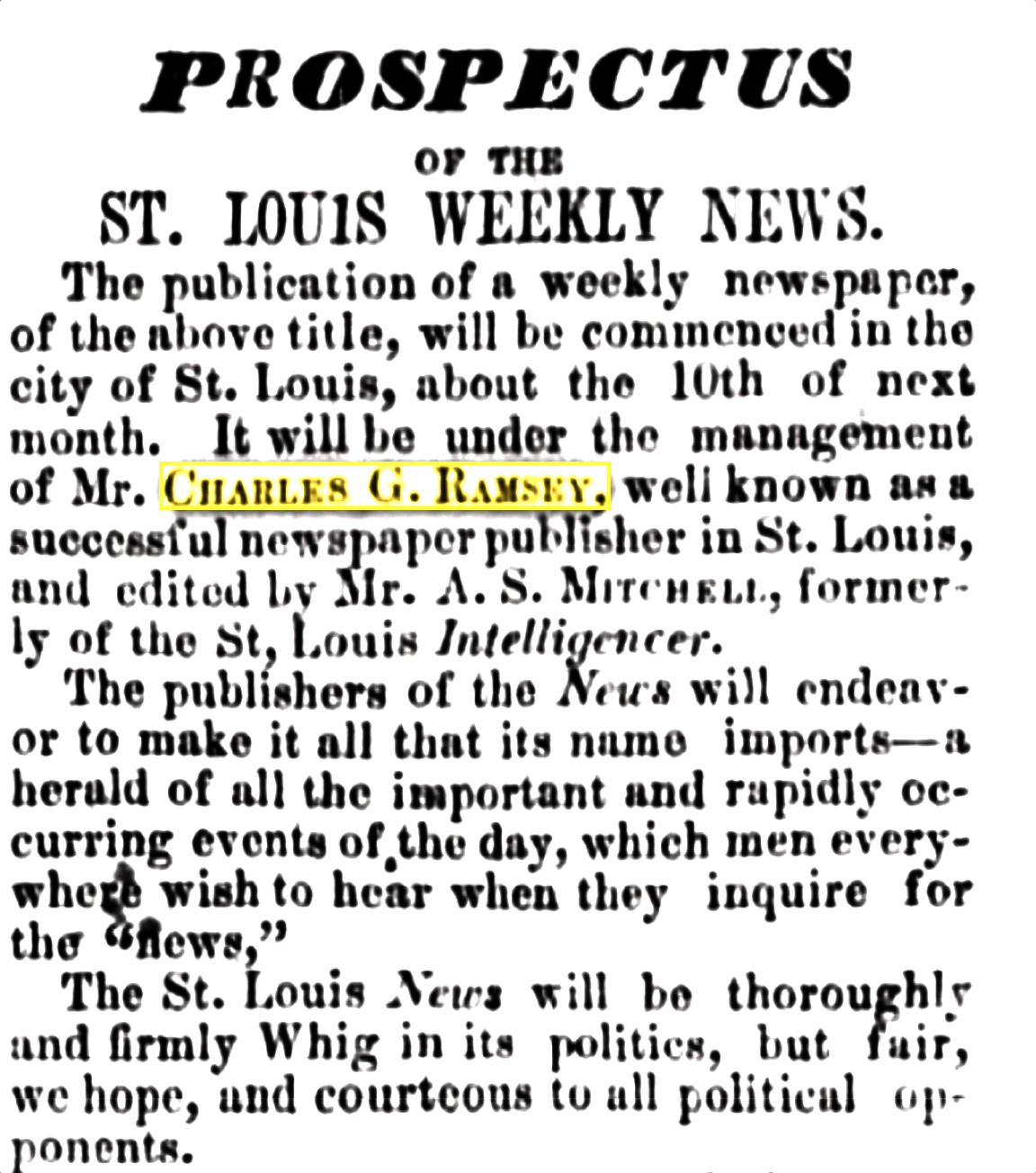
Advertisement in the Palmyra (Missouri) Weekly Whig, June 24, 1852, announcing the future appearance of the St. Louis Weekly News, with Charles G. Ramsey as publisher

The Daily Era began publishing news about guest registrations in hotels, and on October 28, 1847, the paper noted the arrival of "A. Lincoln and family as staying at Scott's Hotel in St. Louis."

In July 1852, Ramsey founded the St. Louis News, which was to be issued in two editions — a Weekly News which "will be furnished to subscribers singly, or in clubs of any number, at the one invariable price of one dollar a year in advance." The thrice-a-week News was to be "of equal size with the weekly" at three dollars a year. In a "Prospectus," he wrote:

We commend the triweekly paper to the patronage of towns and counties lying on the upper rivers. A weekly paper is too slow for persons living on or near the highways of travel. The News is published at as low prices as have ever before been offered in the west, and the rates will not justify any indulgence in the credit system.

He wrote that the paper would be "thoroughly and firmly Whig in its politics."

At one point, the Evening News ridiculed a North Missouri Railroad engineer named Morris, who challenged Ramsey to a duel. The latter refused and he and his challenger reconciled.

Ramsey was connected in the Evening News endeavor with Abram S. Mitchell, and at one point the former took over the editorial management of both the News and a newspaper called The Intelligencer. Samuel Clemens, later known as writer Mark Twain, was one of the employees while Ramsey was with the News. Printer William G. Waite recalled in 1902 that Clemens

was a good printer, but mighty independent. He was always called 'that boy' by Charles G. Ramsey, proprietor and editor of the News. He'd get down late once in a while, and Ramsey would say: "Here's that –– boy late again." Clemens didn't say anything to this for a long time, but one morning he turned to Ramsey and replied: "Take your dashed situation, and go to (a warm country)!" He left the office[,] and we heard nothing of him for several years.

The office of the St. Louis Daily Evening News and Intelligencer was on the west side of Third Street, north of Olive, then a new center of downtown activity.

Ramsey, who was a strong supporter of the Union, at one point criticized General John C. Frémont's command of Union troops stationed in St. Louis. Frémont ordered him arrested on a charge of "giving aid and comfort to the enemy", and he was placed in the Gratiot Street Prison. He was brought before the general who "with military coldness and sternness," demanded of the prisoner:

"What's your name, sir?"
"What did you say?" asked the publisher, putting his hand back of his ear. [He was "somewhat deaf."]
"What is your name, sir?" with great severity of manner repeated Gen. Frémont.
"My name is Charles G. Ramsey," replied the prisoner, perfectly undisturbed by the military fierceness of the fully uniformed general. "What's your name, sir?"
The stern features of the Military Court relaxed a little, and a few moments later he was seen to be about ready to burst out in laughter which he was suppressing.

Ramsey left the News afterward.

He later published the Intelligencer, which was edited by Joseph B. Crockett, who became a justice of the California Supreme Court in 1868.

In 1874, Ramsey ran for St. Louis County recorder, and in 1877 he was called before the city's Board of Health to answer the charge of maintaining a pond of stagnant water on the west side of Columbus Street between Harper and Ann streets. The board decided that the cost of remedying the situation would be paid by the city. His name was presented as a candidate for inspector of weights and measures in March 1885, but he lost the bid at a Republican nominating convention.

Ramsey died on December 31, 1887; his funeral was on January 3, 1888. His sister, Kate Ramsey, died on February 29 of the same year.
