= National Register of Historic Places listings in Crawford County, Pennsylvania =

Location of Crawford County in Pennsylvania

This is a list of the National Register of Historic Places listings in Crawford County, Pennsylvania.

This is intended to be a complete list of the properties and districts on the National Register of Historic Places in Crawford County, Pennsylvania, United States. The locations of National Register properties and districts for which the latitude and longitude coordinates are included below, may be seen in a map.

There are 21 properties and districts listed on the National Register in the county.

This National Park Service list is complete through NPS recent listings posted April 24, 2026.

== Current listings ==
	Name on the Register	Image	Date listed	Location	City or town	Description
1	Baldwin-Reynolds House	Baldwin-Reynolds House	December 30, 1974 (#74001777)	Terrace Street; 41°38′52″N 80°09′07″W	Meadville	
2	Bentley Hall	Bentley Hall	May 6, 1977 (#77001156)	Allegheny College campus 41°38′55″N 80°08′51″W	Meadville	
3	Bridge in East Fallowfield Township	Bridge in East Fallowfield Township	June 22, 1988 (#88000825)	Legislative Route 20012 over Unger Run; 41°32′06″N 80°20′12″W	East Fallowfield Township	Replaced
4	Bridge in Oil Creek Township	Bridge in Oil Creek Township	June 22, 1988 (#88000833)	State Route 2020 over Oil Creek; 41°37′45″N 79°42′10″W	Oil Creek Township	Removed from site.
5	Bridge in Rockdale Township	Bridge in Rockdale Township	June 22, 1988 (#88000829)	Legislative Route 20076 over French Creek; 41°48′38″N 79°59′02″W	Rockdale Township	Replaced
6	Bridge in West Mead Township	Bridge in West Mead Township	June 22, 1988 (#88000827)	Legislative Route 20027 over French Creek; 41°35′21″N 80°09′02″W	West Mead Township	Replaced
7	John Brown Tannery Site	John Brown Tannery Site	December 14, 1978 (#78002383)	500 feet south of the junction of Pennsylvania Route 77 and John Brown Road; 41°43′09″N 79°57′04″W	Richmond Township	Only the foundation remains after a fire in 1907
8	Cambridge Springs Bridge	Cambridge Springs Bridge	June 22, 1988 (#88000824)	Legislative Route 84 spur B over French Creek; 41°48′23″N 80°03′41″W	Cambridge Springs	Replaced
9	William and Elisabeth Edwards House		February 12, 2024 (#100009921)	128 Davenport Street; 41°49′22″N 79°41′24″W	Spartansburg	
10	Independent Congregational Church	Independent Congregational Church	March 8, 1978 (#78002381)	346 Chestnut Street; 41°38′14″N 80°09′01″W	Meadville	
11	Amos Kelly House	Amos Kelly House	July 23, 1980 (#80003477)	325 South Main Street; 41°48′06″N 80°03′32″W	Cambridge Springs	
12	Meadville Downtown Historic District	Meadville Downtown Historic District	October 2, 1984 (#84000023)	Roughly bounded by Chancery Lane, Mulberry, Walnut and Chestnut Streets; 41°38′20″N 80°09′04″W	Meadville	
13	Dr. J.R. Mosier Office	Dr. J.R. Mosier Office	June 13, 1976 (#77001157)	Terrace Street; 41°38′47″N 80°09′08″W	Meadville	
14	Riverside Hotel	Riverside Hotel	December 13, 1978 (#78002380)	1 Fountain Street; 41°48′21″N 80°03′12″W	Cambridge Springs	Destroyed by fire, May 2nd, 2017
15	Roueche House	Roueche House	March 4, 1982 (#82003784)	762 Park Avenue; 41°38′33″N 80°09′04″W	Meadville	
16	Ruter Hall	Ruter Hall	September 18, 1978 (#78002382)	North Main Street on Allegheny College campus 41°38′54″N 80°08′46″W	Meadville	
17	Edward Saeger House	Edward Saeger House	August 22, 1980 (#80003479)	375 Main Street; 41°43′07″N 80°08′53″W	Saegertown	
18	Judge Henry Shippen House	Judge Henry Shippen House	June 6, 1984 (#84003339)	403 Chestnut Street; 41°38′14″N 80°08′52″W	Meadville	
19	Titusville City Hall	Titusville City Hall	March 31, 1975 (#75001635)	107 North Franklin Street; 41°37′39″N 79°40′25″W	Titusville	
20	Titusville Historic District	Titusville Historic District	January 31, 1985 (#85000178)	Roughly bounded by Petroleum, Spruce, Franklin, Perry, Monroe, Main and Spring Streets; 41°37′47″N 79°40′26″W	Titusville	
21	Titusville Iron Works Historic District		March 2, 2026 (#100012770)	315 S. Franklin Street; 41°37′29″N 79°40′25″W	Titusville	

== Former listings ==
	Name on the Register	Image	Date listed	Date removed	Location	City or town	Description
1	Shadeland		May 6, 1983 (#83002230)	August 7, 1992	North of Springboro on Pennsylvania Route 18	Springboro	Burned down by owners on June 28, 1992.
2	Dr. James White House		July 24, 1980 (#80003478)	July 21, 2004	Junction of U.S. Route 322 and Pennsylvania Route 285	Hartstown	

== See also ==
- List of National Historic Landmarks in Pennsylvania
- National Register of Historic Places listings in Pennsylvania
- List of Pennsylvania state historical markers in Crawford County
