= List of Pennsylvania state historical markers in Crawford County =

Location of Crawford County in Pennsylvania

This is a list of the Pennsylvania state historical markers in Crawford County.

This is intended to be a complete list of the official state historical markers placed in Crawford County, Pennsylvania by the Pennsylvania Historical and Museum Commission (PHMC). The locations of the historical markers, as well as the latitude and longitude coordinates as provided by the PHMC's database, are included below when available. There are 38 historical markers located in Crawford County.

== Historical markers ==
| Marker title | Image | Date dedicated | Location | Marker type | Topics |
| Allegheny College | | November 19, 1946 | North Main Street (PA 86) at East College Street, Meadville; 41.647822°N 80.14597°W | Roadside | Education |
| Baldwin-Reynolds House | | April 14, 1947 | Baldwin & Reynolds Avenues, Meadville; 41.64642°N 80.14975°W | Roadside | Government & Politics, Government & Politics 19th Century, Houses & Homesteads |
| Birthplace of the Direct Primary | | May 12, 2000 | At Courthouse, Diamond Park Square & East Center Street, Meadville; 41.63878°N 80.14943°W | Roadside | Government & Politics, Government & Politics 19th Century |
| Bishop James M. Thoburn | | November 18, 1946 | At cemetery, Blooming Valley Road (PA 77), east end of Meadville; 41.64402°N 80.13117°W | Roadside | Religion |
| Byron D. Benson (1832-1888) | | December 10, 2009 | 603 North Perry Street, north of West Oak Street, Titusville; 41.633417°N 79.677033°W | City | Oil & Gas, Professions & Vocations |
| Cambridge Springs | | September 15, 2001 | At the Public Park, South Main Street (PA 86) & Church Street, Cambridge Springs; 41.80395°N 80.05698°W | Roadside | Business & Industry, Environment, Medicine & Science, Railroads, Inns & Taverns |
| Conneaut Reservoir | | September 20, 1948 | Grand Army of the Republic Highway (US 6), east of Conneaut Lake (SIGN MISSING-POST ONLY); 41.60417°N 80.29138°W | Roadside | Canals, Navigation, Transportation |
| Crawford County | | May 12, 1982 | 903 Diamond Park Square, between East Cherry & East Center Streets, Meadville; 41.63817°N 80.1502°W | City | Business & Industry, Early Settlement, Government & Politics, Government & Politics 19th Century, Oil & Gas |
| Desegregation of Pennsylvania Schools | | May 12, 2000 | The Second District School, South Main Street near Autumn Drive, Meadville; 41.63017°N 80.15327°W | Roadside | African American, Education, Government & Politics 19th Century |
| Early Refinery | | September 29, 1954 | At bus garage, East Central Avenue (PA 27), Titusville; 41.62653°N 79.65322°W | City | Business & Industry, Oil & Gas |
| Edwin L. Drake | | November 18, 1946 | Woodlawn Cemetery, Spring Street (PA 8), Titusville; 41.632056°N 79.690444°W | Roadside | Business & Industry, Oil & Gas |
| Erie Extension Canal | | September 20, 1948 | Liberty Street (US 322), east of Hartstown; 41.55345°N 80.37487°W | Roadside | Canals, Navigation, Transportation |
| Erie Extension Canal | | July 12, 1948 | PA 618 south of Conneaut Lake Park; 41.62215°N 80.32587°W | Roadside | Canals, Navigation, Transportation |
| Erie Extension Canal | | July 12, 1948 | US 6 & 322, east of Conneaut Lake (MISSING) | Roadside | Canals, Navigation, Transportation |
| Erie Extension Canal | | July 14, 1948 | PA 18 at Old Depot Road, north of Conneautville; 41.76513°N 80.37395°W | Roadside | Canals, Navigation, Transportation |
| Erie Extension Canal | | July 13, 1948 | Grand Army of the Republic Highway (US 6) near Brooks Road, Linesville; 41.62753°N 80.37753°W | Roadside | Canals, Navigation, Transportation |
| Erie Extension Canal | | July 13, 1948 | PA 18, south of Adamsville (MISSING) | Roadside | Canals, Environment, Navigation, Transportation |
| French Creek | | November 19, 1946 | US 6 & 19, south of Venango (MISSING) | Roadside | Early Settlement, Environment, French & Indian War, George Washington |
| French Creek Feeder | | July 12, 1948 | Perry Highway (US 19), southwest of Meadville; 41.55793°N 80.18505°W | Roadside | Canals, Navigation, Transportation |
| French Creek Feeder | | July 13, 1948 | Cochranton Road (US 322) near Shreck Road, south of Meadville; 41.57863°N 80.1254°W | Roadside | Canals, Navigation, Transportation |
| Ida M. Tarbell | | September 30, 1954 | 314 East Main Street, Titusville; 41.628368°N 79.66813°W | City | Abraham Lincoln, Women, Writers |
| John A. Mather | | September 14, 1964 | 407 East Main Street, Titusville; 41.628267°N 79.666817°W | City | Artists, Business & Industry, Ethnic & Immigration, Oil & Gas |
| John Brown Tannery | | 1969 | PA 77 near John Brown Road, New Richmond; 41.720883°N 79.952333°W | Roadside | African American, Business & Industry, Houses & Homesteads, Underground Railroad |
| John Brown's Tannery | | November 18, 1946 | At site, John Brown Road, just south of PA 77, New Richmond; 41.71892°N 79.95073°W | Roadside | African American, Professions & Vocations, Underground Railroad |
| John William Heisman (1869–1936) | | August 28, 2009 | Adjacent to Carter Field, Central Avenue & Brown Street, Titusville; 41.627651°N 79.665081°W | Roadside | Football, Sports |
| Meadville | | November 1, 1946 | US 6 & 19 north of Meadville (MISSING) | Roadside | Cities & Towns, Early Settlement, Government & Politics, Government & Politics 18th Century, Invention |
| Meadville | | November 1, 1946 | South Main Street (US 322), south end of Meadville; 41.62718°N 80.1542°W | Roadside | Business & Industry, Cities & Towns, Early Settlement, Government & Politics 19th Century, Invention |
| Meadville | | November 1, 1946 | US 6 & 322 west of Meadville (MISSING) | Roadside | Business & Industry, Cities & Towns, Early Settlement, Government & Politics 19th Century, Invention |
| Oil Creek | | September 30, 1954 | Smock Boulevard (PA 8) at Bloss Street, Titusville; 41.62177°N 79.673°W | City | Business & Industry, Exploration, Native American, Oil & Gas |
| Oil-Producing Salt Well | | May 17, 1985 | Pierpoint Road (PA 198) near Reeds Corners Road, 1 mile E of Ohio line, near Conneautville; 41.765250°N 80.492017°W | Roadside | Business & Industry, Oil & Gas |
| Pennsylvania | | February 8, 1949 | Grand Army of the Republic Highway (US 6), 200 feet from state line (MISSING) | Roadside | Government & Politics, Government & Politics 17th Century, William Penn |
| Pennsylvania | | February 8, 1949 | US 322, .4 miles from state line, Jamestown (MISSING) | Roadside | Government & Politics, Government & Politics 17th Century, William Penn |
| Raymond Philip Shafer (1917-2006) | | July 1, 2010 | 911 Diamond Park Square, south of East Cherry Street, Meadville; 41.638017°N 80.149713°W | Roadside | Government & Politics 20th Century, Governors |
| Richard Henderson | | June 1, 1980 | Liberty & Arch Streets, next to Bethel AME Church, Meadville; 41.635989°N 80.14867°W | City | African American, Professions & Vocations, Underground Railroad |
| Roberts Torpedo | | September 29, 1954 | Smock Boulevard (PA 8), near Dutch Hill Road, south end of Titusville; 41.61875°N 79.6713°W | City | Business & Industry, Invention, Oil & Gas |
| Rural Electrification | | August 20, 1986 | PA 198 at Woodcock Creek Lake, east of PA 86, near Saegertown; 41.70228°N 80.10195°W | Roadside | Business & Industry, Electricity |
| Titusville Oil Exchange | | September 21, 1999 | West Spring Street, between South Washington & Exchange Streets, Titusville; 41.626482°N 79.6747°W | City | Business & Industry, Oil & Gas |
| Unitarian Church | | June 29, 1957 | South Main & Chestnut Streets, Meadville; 41.63758°N 80.15033°W | City | Religion |

== See also ==
- List of Pennsylvania state historical markers
- National Register of Historic Places listings in Crawford County, Pennsylvania
