= Titusville Historic District =

Titusville Historic District may refer to:

- Titusville Historic District (Titusville, Florida)
- Titusville Historic District (Titusville, New Jersey), listed on the National Register of Historic Places in Mercer County, New Jersey
- Titusville Historic District (Titusville, Pennsylvania), listed on the National Register of Historic Places in Crawford County, Pennsylvania
