= Richmond Township, Pennsylvania =

Richmond Township is the name of some places in the U.S. state of Pennsylvania:

- Richmond Township, Berks County, Pennsylvania
- Richmond Township, Crawford County, Pennsylvania
- Richmond Township, Tioga County, Pennsylvania
