= Roueché =

Roueché is a surname. Notable people with the surname include:

- Berton Roueché (1910–1994), American writer
- Charlotte Roueché (born 1946), British academic
- Clayton Roueche (born 1975), Canadian gangster.

== See also ==
- Roueche House, historic home in Pennsylvania
