= Dr. J. R. Mosier Office =

- U.S. National Register of Historic Places
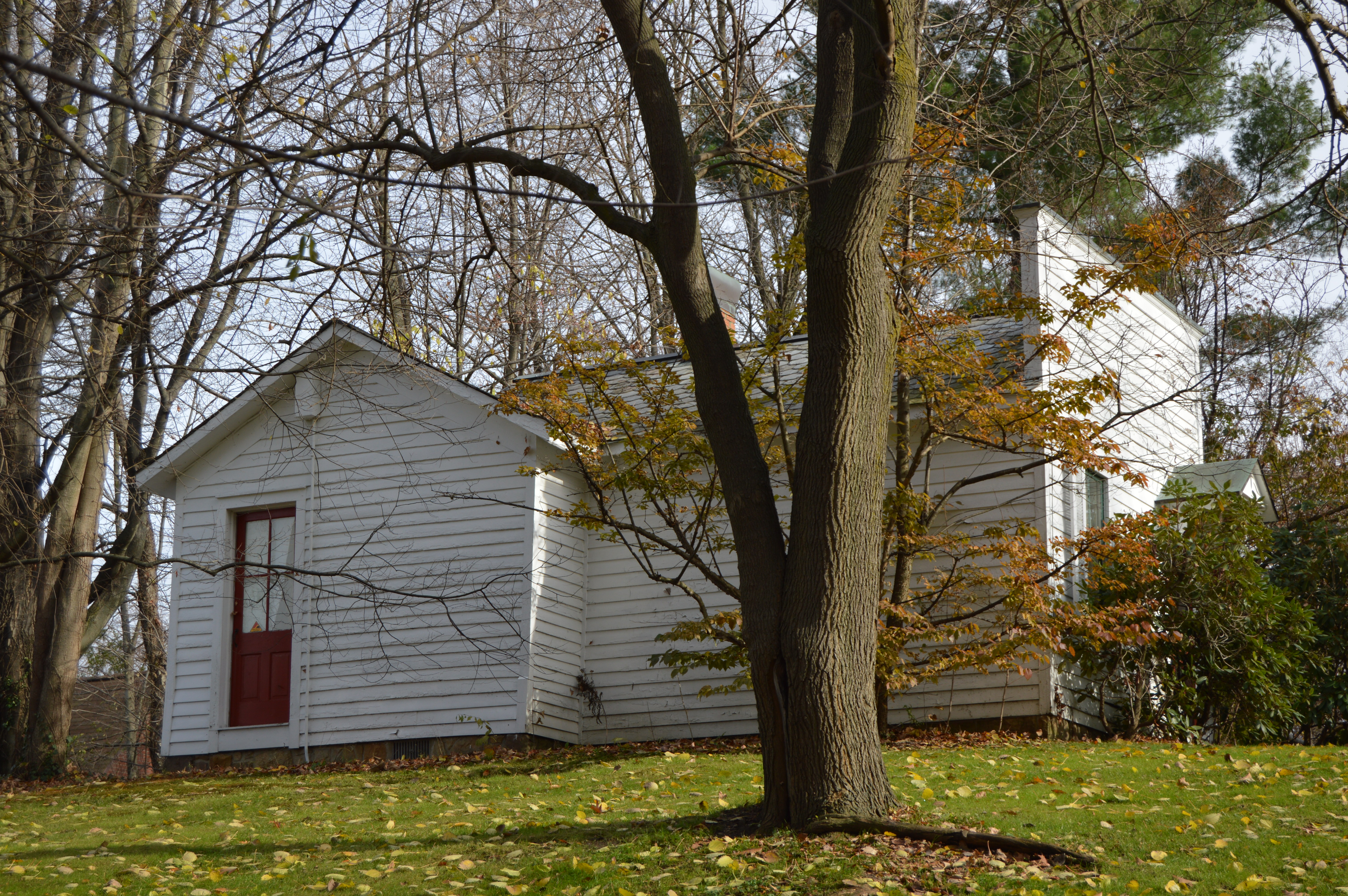
- Western side and front

- Location within Pennsylvania Location within the United States
- Interactive map showing the location of Dr. J. R. Mosier Office
- Location: Terrace St., Meadville, Pennsylvania
- Coordinates: 41°42′46″N 80°13′45″W
- Area: 0.2 acres (0.081 ha)
- Built: c. 1890
- NRHP reference No.: 77001157
- Added to NRHP: June 13, 1976

Dr. J. R. Mosier Office is a historic medical office located at Meadville, Crawford County, Pennsylvania. It was built about 1890, and is a small, clapboard clad frame building. It features a false front in front of a gable roof. The interior consists of three rooms furnished as they were in 1938; a waiting room, examination room, and pharmacy. The building was moved to the Baldwin-Reynolds House property in 1975 from its original location in the village of Littles Corners about 7 miles northwest of Meadville. The office is maintained as a medical museum by the Crawford County Historical Society.

It was added to the National Register of Historic Places in 1976.
