= Nicholson House and Inn =

- U.S. National Register of Historic Places
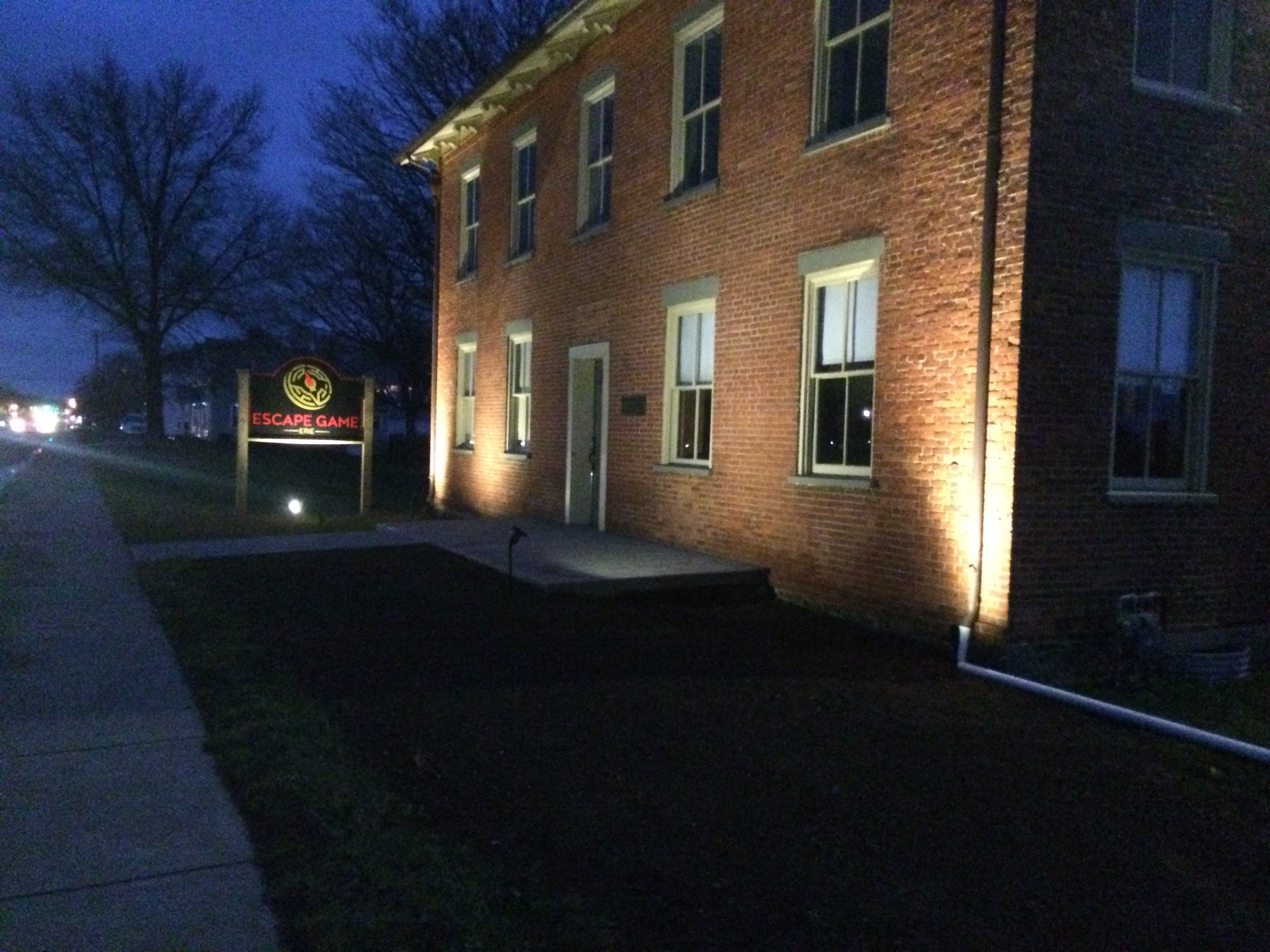
- Nicholson House and Inn, 2017

- Location within Pennsylvania Location within the United States
- Location: 4838 W. Ridge Rd., Millcreek Township, Pennsylvania
- Coordinates: 42°4′13″N 80°11′5″W
- Area: 0.5 acres (0.20 ha)
- Built: 1825-1827
- Built by: Hoskinson, William & James; Pherrin, John
- Architectural style: Federal
- NRHP reference No.: 85000606
- Added to NRHP: February 26, 1985

The Nicholson House and Inn is an historic inn and tavern in Millcreek Township, Erie County, Pennsylvania, United States.

It was added to the National Register of Historic Places in 1985.

== History and architectural features ==
Designed in the Federal style and built between 1825 and 1835, this historic structure is a brick, "four over four" building that sits on a stone foundation. It measures fifty-two feet wide and has a gable roof. The roof overhang is supported by decorative brackets. Following the death of her husband, John, Isobella Nicholson designed this twelve-room house herself, and financed its construction with her own savings. It served as a stagecoach stop, an inn near the Erie Extension Canal, a post office from 1842 to 1857, a farm supply and general store, and a stop on the Buffalo and Conneaut trolley line.

The Nicholson House has undergone recent remodeling and is currently the home of Escape Game Erie.

== Gallery ==
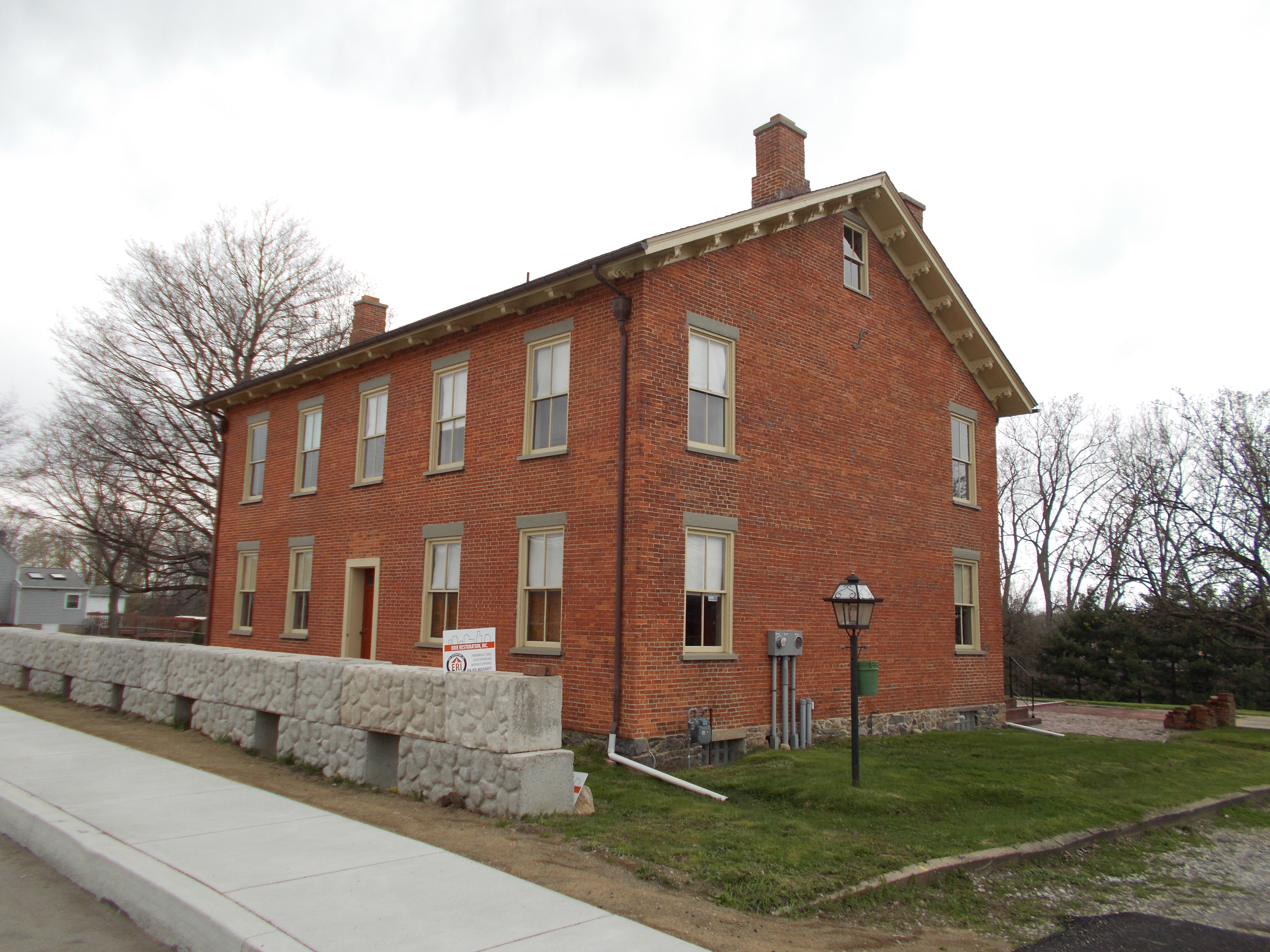
Nicholson House and Inn
