= Meadville Downtown Historic District =

Historic district in Pennsylvania, United States

- U.S. National Register of Historic Places
- U.S. Historic district
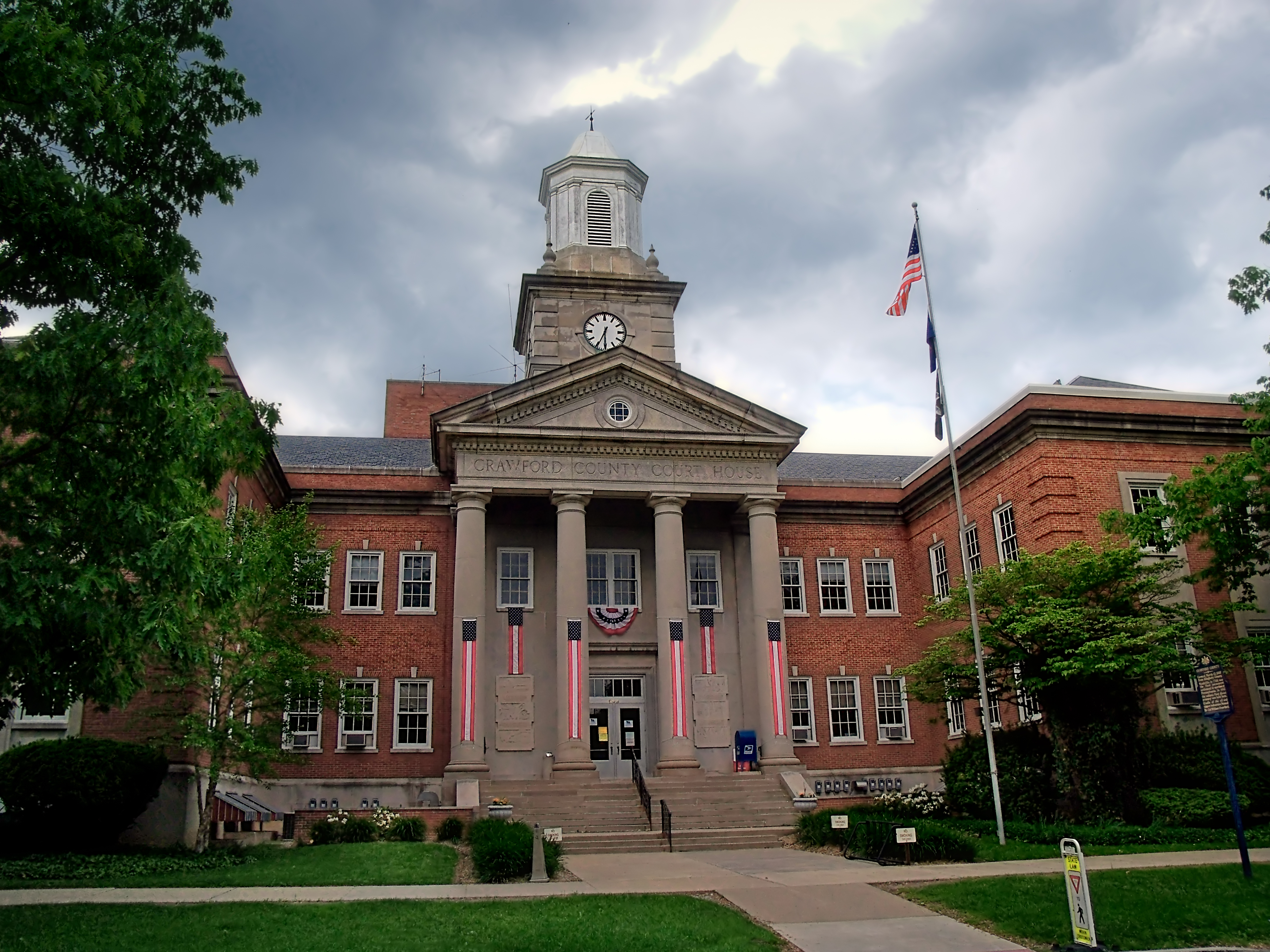
- Crawford County Courthouse

- Location within Pennsylvania Location within the United States
- Location: Roughly bounded by Chancery Lane, Mulberry, Walnut and Chestnut Sts., Meadville, Pennsylvania
- Coordinates: 41°38′20″N 80°09′04″W
- Area: 6.5 acres (2.6 ha)
- Built: 1800–1940
- Architectural style: Mid 19th Century Revival, Italianate, Victorian
- NRHP reference No.: 84000023
- Added to NRHP: October 2, 1984

The Meadville Downtown Historic District is a national historic district that is located in Meadville, Crawford County, Pennsylvania, United States.

It was added to the National Register of Historic Places in 1984.

== History and architectural features ==
This district is centered on Diamond Park and includes eighty-one contributing buildings and eighteen contributing sites that are located in the central business district of Meadville. It includes a mix of commercial, industrial, and governmental/institutional buildings that were built roughly between 1800 and 1940, and were designed in a variety of popular architectural styles, including Greek Revival, Italianate, Second Empire, and Victorian. Notable buildings include the Crawford County Courthouse, Ralston Block (1880-1890), Kronenfeld Building, Market House (1870), Crawford County Trust Building (1920), U.S. Post Office (1907), Masonic Building, Keystone View Company, and Academy of Music.

== See also ==
- Baldwin-Reynolds House, another NRHP location in Meadville
- National Register of Historic Places in Crawford County, Pennsylvania
