= West Mead Township, Pennsylvania =

Township in Pennsylvania, US

Coordinates: 41°40′00″N 80°08′59″W

West Mead Township, Crawford County, Pennsylvania
- Township
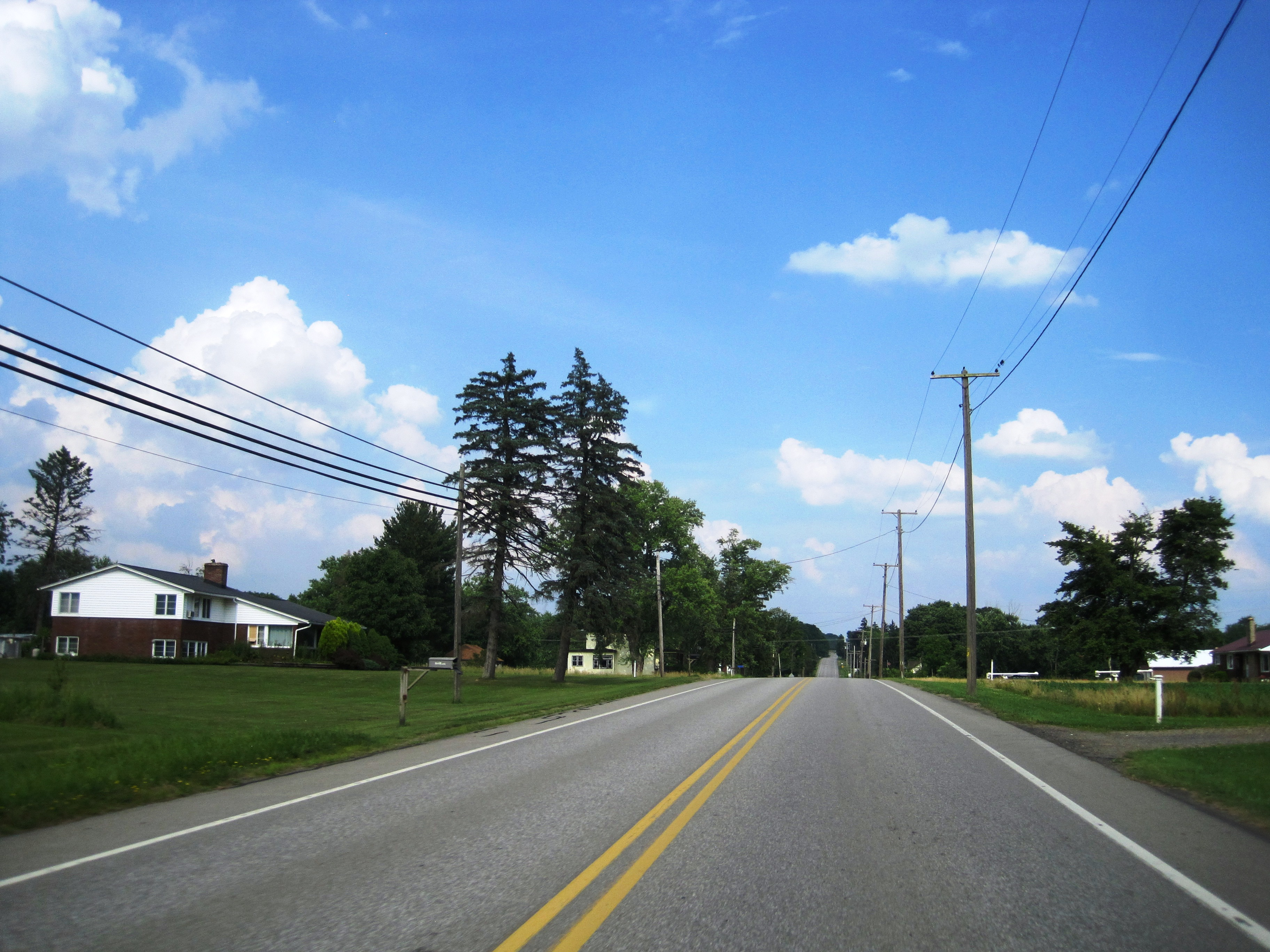
- PA 27 eastbound in West Mead Township
- Motto: "Where Good Things Are Happening"
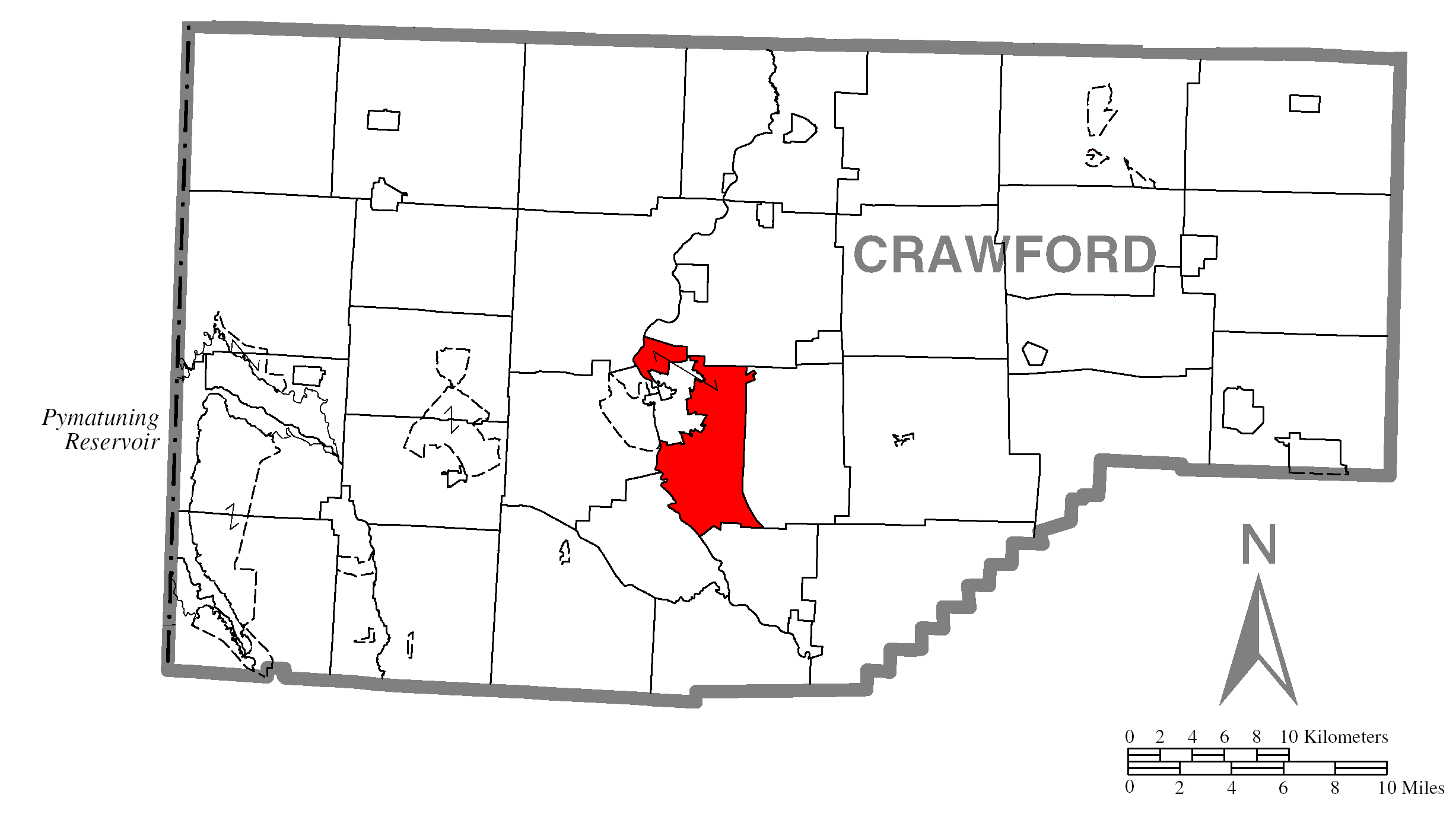
- Location of West Mead Township in Crawford County

- Location of Crawford County in Pennsylvania
- Country: United States
- State: Pennsylvania
- County: Crawford County

Area
  - Total: 18.64 sq mi (48.27 km^{2})
  - Land: 18.29 sq mi (47.37 km^{2})
  - Water: 0.35 sq mi (0.90 km^{2})
- Highest elevation (east of Fairgrounds): 1,570 ft (480 m)
- Lowest elevation (French Creek): 1,060 ft (320 m)

Population (2020)
  - Total: 5,043
  - Estimate (2023): 4,946
  - Density: 281.1/sq mi (108.53/km^{2})
- Time zone: UTC-4 (EST)
  - Summer (DST): UTC-5 (EDT)
- ZIP code: 16335
- Area code: 814
- FIPS code: 42-039-83480
- Website: westmead.org

West Mead Township is a township in Crawford County, Pennsylvania, United States. The population was 5,043 at the 2020 census, down from 5,249 at the 2010 census.

== History ==
In 1898, West Mead Township and East Mead Township were divided, from lands originally referred to as Mead Township. The Bridge in West Mead Township was listed on the National Register of Historic Places in 1988.

== Geography ==
West Mead Township is located slightly southwest of the geographic center of Crawford County. It borders the city of Meadville to the north, east, and south. French Creek forms the western boundary of the township to the north and south of Meadville. Tamarack Lake is in the southeast.

According to the United States Census Bureau, the township has a total area of 18.8 square miles (48.6 km^{2}), of which 18.3 square miles (47.4 km^{2}) is land and 0.50 square miles (1.3 km^{2}), or 2.65%, is water.

== Demographics ==
Historical population
Census	Pop.	Note	%±
2000	5,227		—
2010	5,249		0.4%
2020	5,043		−3.9%
2023 (est.)	4,946		−1.9%
U.S. Decennial Census

As of the census of 2000, there were 5,227 people, 2,098 households, and 1,525 families residing in the township. The population density was 286.9 inhabitants per square mile (110.8/km^{2}). There were 2,184 housing units at an average density of 119.9 per square mile (46.3/km^{2}). The racial makeup of the township was 96.52% White, 2.07% African American, 0.23% Native American, 0.55% Asian, 0.08% from other races, and 0.55% from two or more races. Hispanic or Latino of any race were 0.50% of the population.

There were 2,098 households, out of which 31.6% had children under the age of 18 living with them, 59.5% were married couples living together, 9.4% had a female householder with no husband present, and 27.3% were non-families. 22.6% of all households were made up of individuals, and 11.1% had someone living alone who was 65 years of age or older. The average household size was 2.49 and the average family size was 2.92.

In the township the population was spread out, with 24.6% under the age of 18, 7.2% from 18 to 24, 26.6% from 25 to 44, 26.6% from 45 to 64, and 14.9% who were 65 years of age or older. The median age was 40 years. For every 100 females, there were 93.1 males. For every 100 females age 18 and over, there were 88.9 males.

The median income for a household in the township was $41,793, and the median income for a family was $47,156. Males had a median income of $38,144 versus $22,254 for females. The per capita income for the township was $19,241. About 6.8% of families and 8.2% of the population were below the poverty line, including 15.5% of those under age 18 and 3.2% of those age 65 or over.
