= Bridge in West Mead Township =

- U.S. National Register of Historic Places
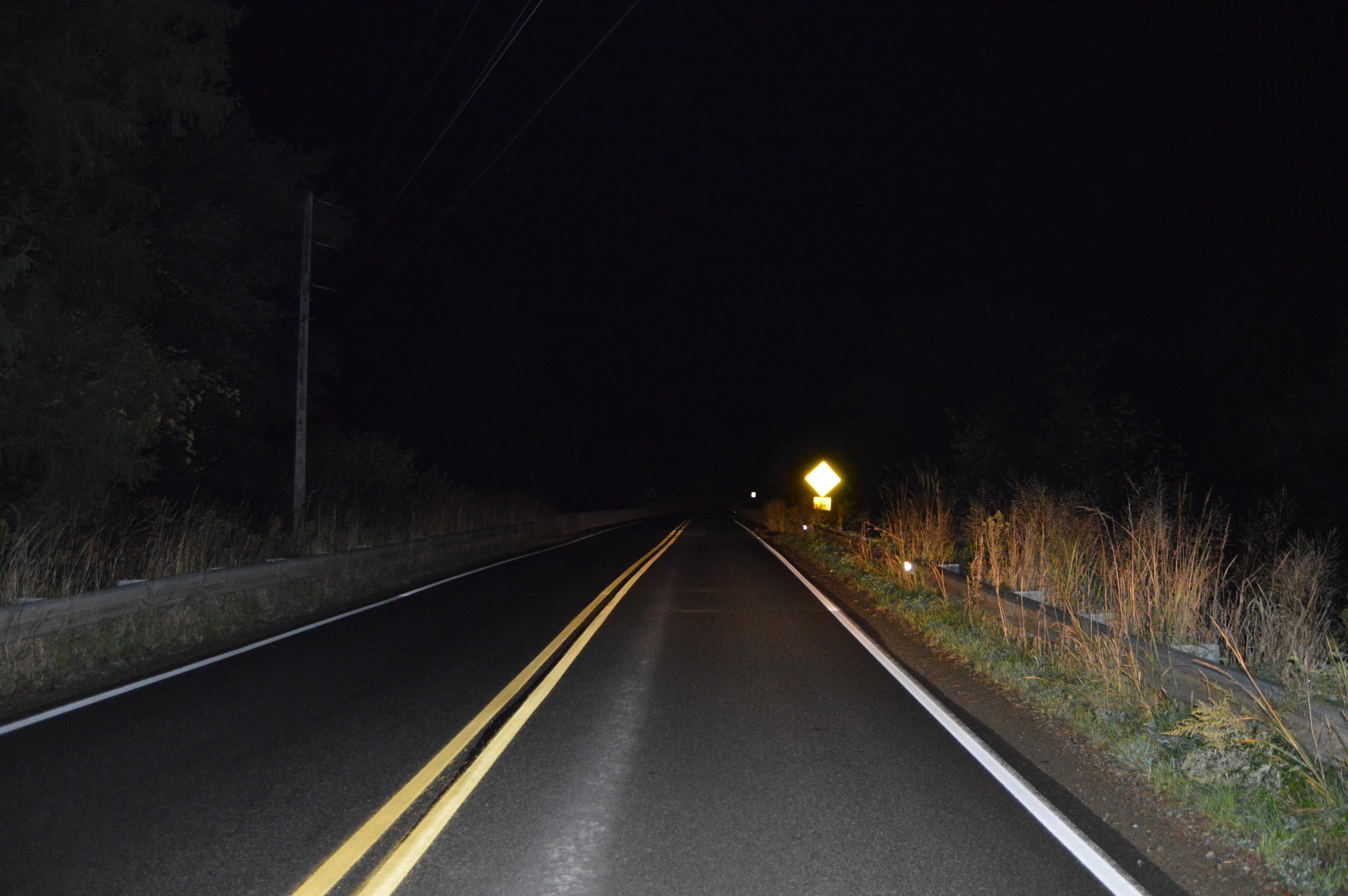
- Concrete girder bridge that has replaced the historic truss bridge

- Location within Pennsylvania Location within the United States
- Location: Legislative Route 20027 over French Creek, West Mead Township, Pennsylvania
- Coordinates: 41°35′21″N 80°9′2″W
- Area: less than one acre
- Built: 1888
- Built by: Penn Bridge Co.
- Architectural style: Pratt through truss
- MPS: Highway Bridges Owned by the Commonwealth of Pennsylvania, Department of Transportation TR
- NRHP reference No.: 88000827
- Added to NRHP: June 22, 1988

The Bridge in West Mead Township was a historic metal truss bridge spanning French Creek at West Mead Township, Crawford County, Pennsylvania. It was built in 1888, and was a single span, Pratt through truss bridge measuring 158-foot-long (48 m). It was built by the Penn Bridge Company of Beaver Falls, Pennsylvania. It has been demolished.

It was added to the National Register of Historic Places in 1988.
