= John Brown Farm, Tannery & Museum =

- John Brown Tannery Site
- U.S. National Register of Historic Places
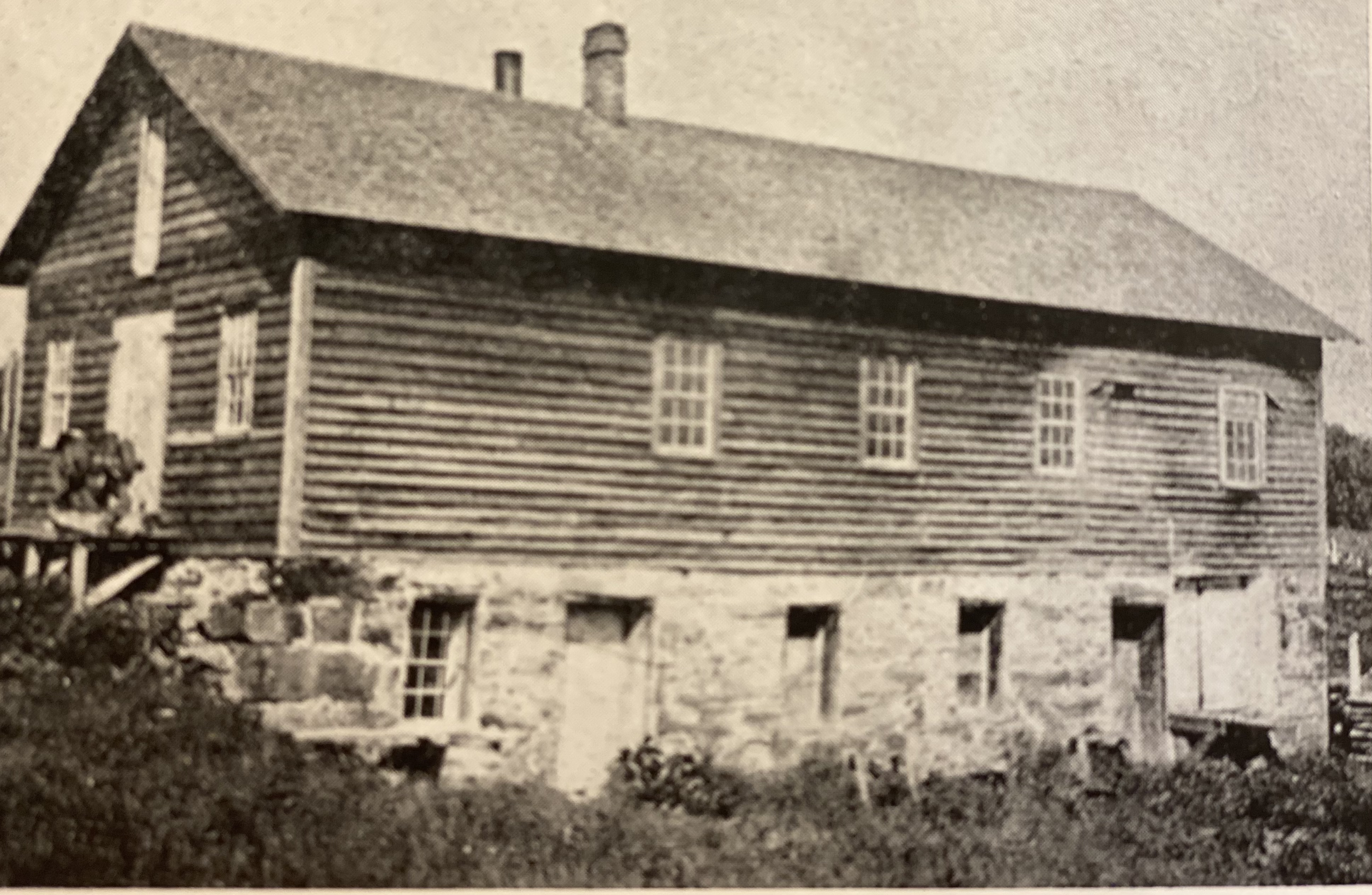
- John Brown's Tannery in 1885

- Location within Pennsylvania Location within the United States
- Location: 500 feet south of the junction of Pennsylvania Route 77 and John Brown Road [17620 John Brown Rd.], Richmond Township, Crawford County, Pennsylvania
- Coordinates: 41°43′8.5″N 79°57′3″W
- Area: 0.5 acres (0.20 ha)
- Built: 1825
- Built by: Brown, John
- NRHP reference No.: 78002383
- Added to NRHP: December 14, 1978

John Brown Farm, Tannery & Museum is a historic archaeological site located in Richmond Township, Crawford County, Pennsylvania. The tannery was built in 1825 by famed abolitionist John Brown (1800–1859), who lived on the site from 1825 to 1835. The tannery was about 0.25 miles (0.40 km) from the new Pennsylvania and Ohio Canal.

The tannery was a major stop on the Underground Railway; Brown helped some 2,500 slaves during this period. The site includes the ruins of the tannery, a one-story, rectangular structure measuring 55 by 22 feet (16.8 by 6.7 m). There was a hidden, well-ventilated room in the barn for the fugitive slaves.

In 1874, in "a wonderful state of preservation", it was converted into a cheese factory, and in 1884 it was turned into a steam grist-mill. "The structure is a relic of great historic interest, and is visited by thousands of curiosity and relic seekers, The windows and doors have all been chipped away. The Brown family have visited their old home several times within the past few years."

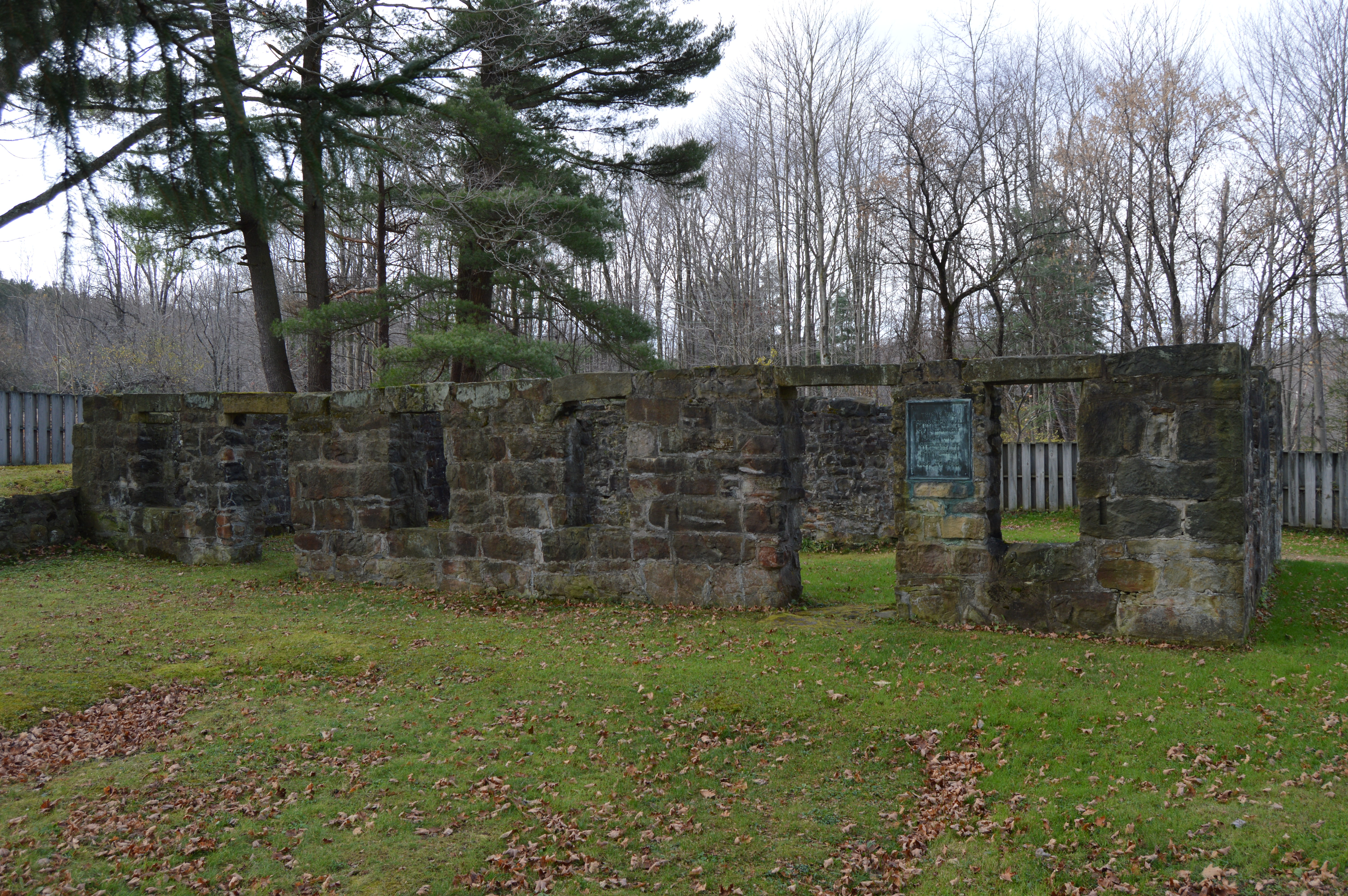
Foundation of John Brown's Tannery, photographed in 2014

A fire destroyed the building in 1907. On John Brown's birthday, May 9, the site hosts a community celebration, "Spirit of Freedom".

It was added to the National Register of Historic Places in 1978.

The graves of Brown's first wife Dianthe, their four-year-old son Frederick (another son was named Frederick later), and an unnamed newborn son are nearby.

== See also ==
- John Brown (abolitionist)#Pennsylvania
