= Pennsylvania and Ohio Canal =

Shipping canal operating from 1840 to 1872

Coordinates: 41°8′32″N 81°22′25″W

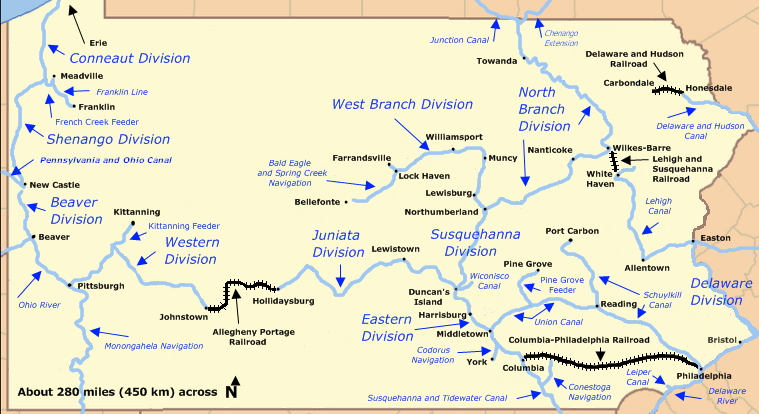
- A map of Pennsylvania's historic canals and connecting railroads

Specifications
- Status: Generally abandoned except for historic interest

History
- Construction began: 1835
- Date completed: 1840
- Date closed: 1877

Geography
- Start point: New Castle, Pennsylvania, U.S.
- End point: Akron, Ohio, U.S.
- Connects to: Beaver and Erie Canal, Ohio and Erie Canal

Pennsylvania and Ohio Canal: Ohio portion
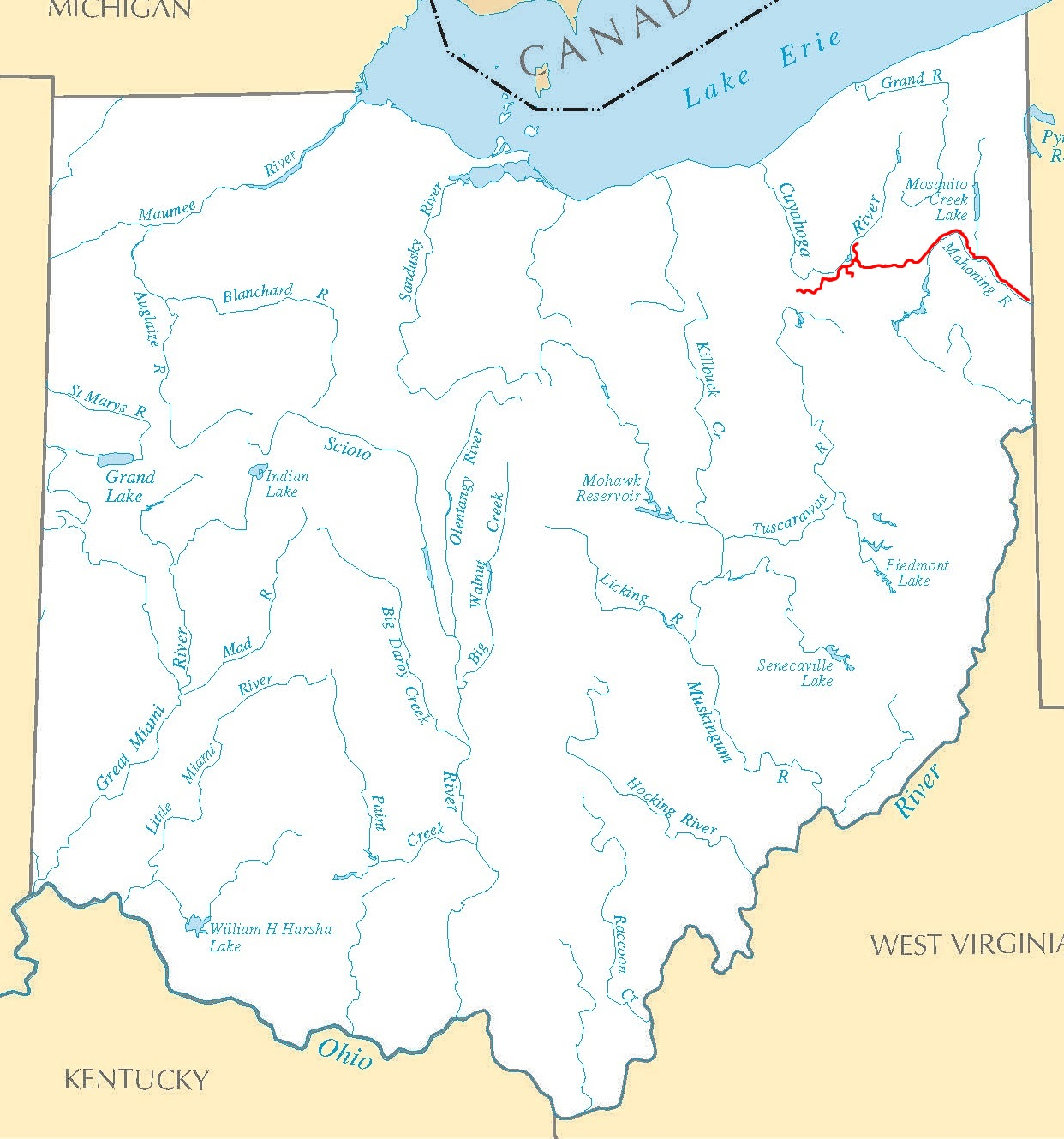
- Map of Ohio Portion of the P&O Canal

The Pennsylvania and Ohio Canal, also known as the P & O Canal, the Cross Cut Canal and the Mahoning Canal, was a shipping canal which operated from 1840 until 1872, with all property sold off by 1877. It connected canals in two states, the Ohio and Erie Canal in Ohio and the Beaver and Erie Canal in Pennsylvania, and was funded by private interests.

== History ==
In Warren, Ohio, during a convention on November 13, 1833, 109 delegates decided to privately fund the Pennsylvania and Ohio Canal since neither state felt it should spend money on a canal that led to another state. Construction began on September 17, 1835, when the two engineers of the canal struck iron stakes in the ground at the center of what was known as the "Portage Summit" between present-day Kent and Ravenna in Ohio. Workers manually dug the 82 miles (132 km) of the canal using picks, shovels, and wheelbarrows.

The canal ran from New Castle, Pennsylvania to Akron, Ohio, where it met the Ohio and Erie Canal in downtown Akron. It ran along old Native American trails and the Cuyahoga and Mahoning Rivers. In Northeast Ohio, Brady Lake, and other water sources for used by the canal. Large celebrations occurred along the canal's route when it officially opened on April 3, 1840.

== Impact ==
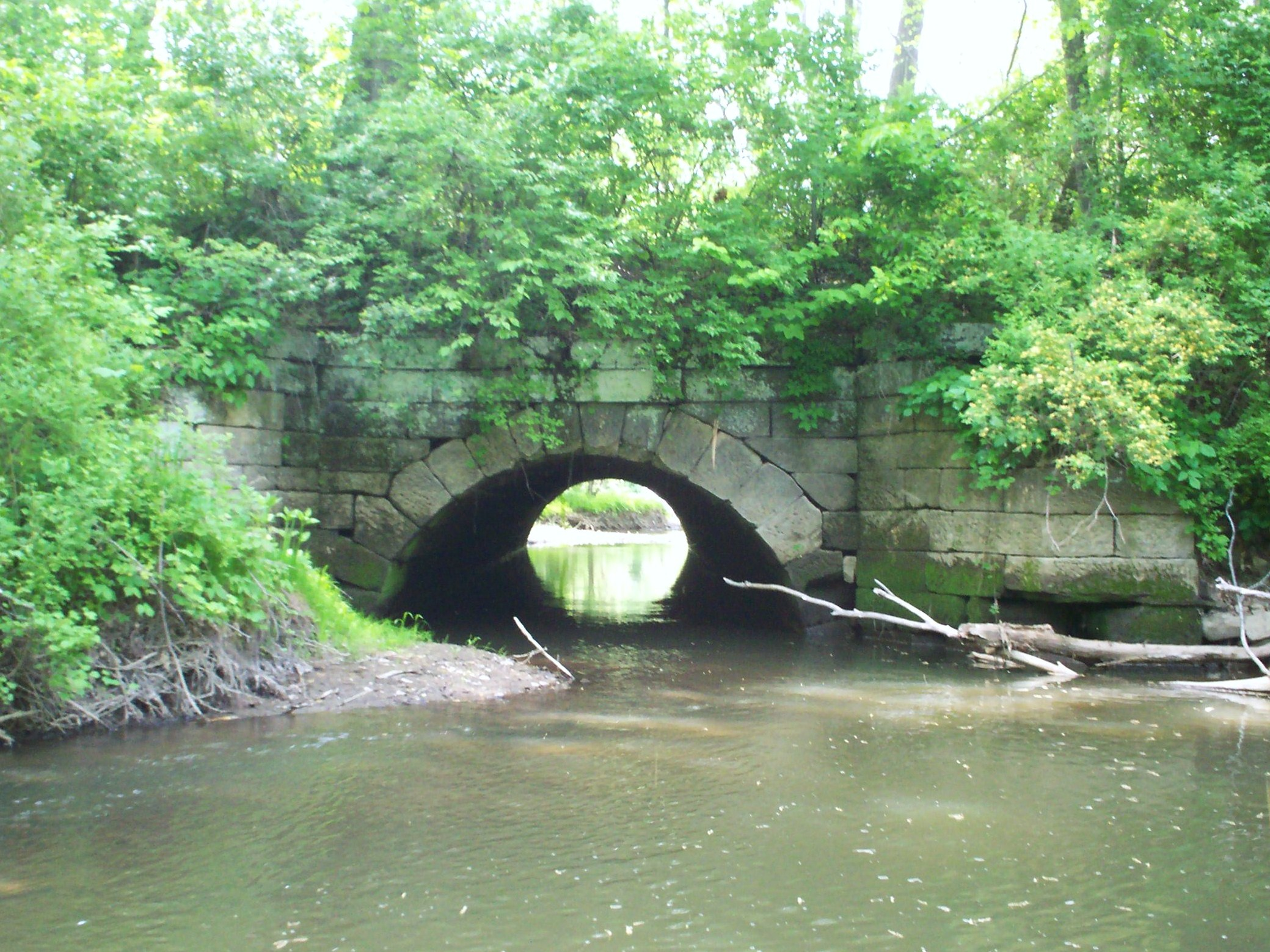
Culvert, sometimes called an aqueduct, that carried the canal over Plum Creek in Kent, Ohio

As with other canals in the region, mules and horses pulled the canal boats that navigated the P & O. Using this and other canals, goods and passengers were ferried from Pittsburgh to Cleveland and Lake Erie. This contributed to trade between Northeast Ohio and other Eastern states making towns and villages along the canal larger and more prosperous. Some have also credited the canal with the development of the iron ore industry in the Mahoning Valley in Ohio.

== Closing ==
With the arrival and expansion of railroads, the canal gradually diminished. All sections of the canal had been abandoned by 1872 and the canal was officially closed in 1877 when all remaining property was sold off. Today, traces of the canal's bed remain in many areas of Northeast Ohio including Munroe Falls, Ohio and downtown Kent, Ohio, where the Cuyahoga River runs through the former canal lock. A P & O Canal culvert, sometimes referred to as an aqueduct, remains in southern Kent over Plum Creek just south of the Cuyahoga River.

== See also ==
- List of canals in the United States
- Ohio and Erie Canal
