= Titusville City Hall =

- U.S. National Register of Historic Places
- U.S. Historic district – Contributing property
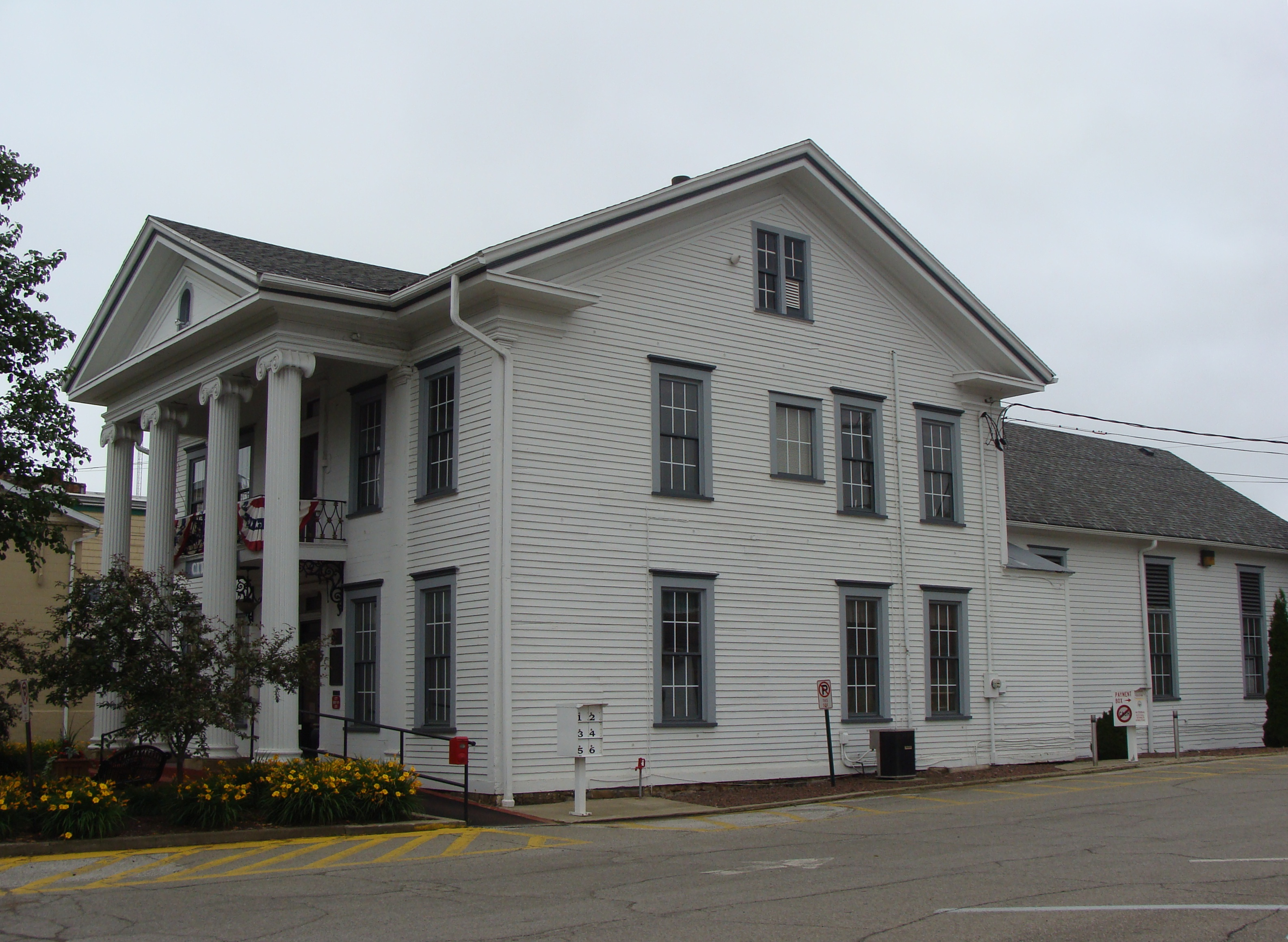
- Titusville City Hall, July 2011

- Location within Pennsylvania Location within the United States
- Location: 107 N. Franklin St., Titusville, Pennsylvania
- Coordinates: 41°37′38″N 79°40′27″W
- Area: 2 acres (0.81 ha)
- Built: 1865-1872
- Architectural style: Greek Revival
- NRHP reference No.: 75001635
- Added to NRHP: March 31, 1975

Titusville City Hall is a city hall that is located in Titusville, Crawford County, Pennsylvania.

It was added to the National Register of Historic Places in 1975. It is in the Titusville Historic District.

== History and architectural features ==
Built in 1865 as a private dwelling and later operated as a hotel. It is a 2 1/2-story, frame building in the Greek Revival style. The front facade features a portico with four Ionic order columns supporting a pediment and entablature. Two wings were added between 1865 and 1872, at which time it became the city hall.
