= Judge Henry Shippen House =

Historic house in Pennsylvania, United States

- U.S. National Register of Historic Places
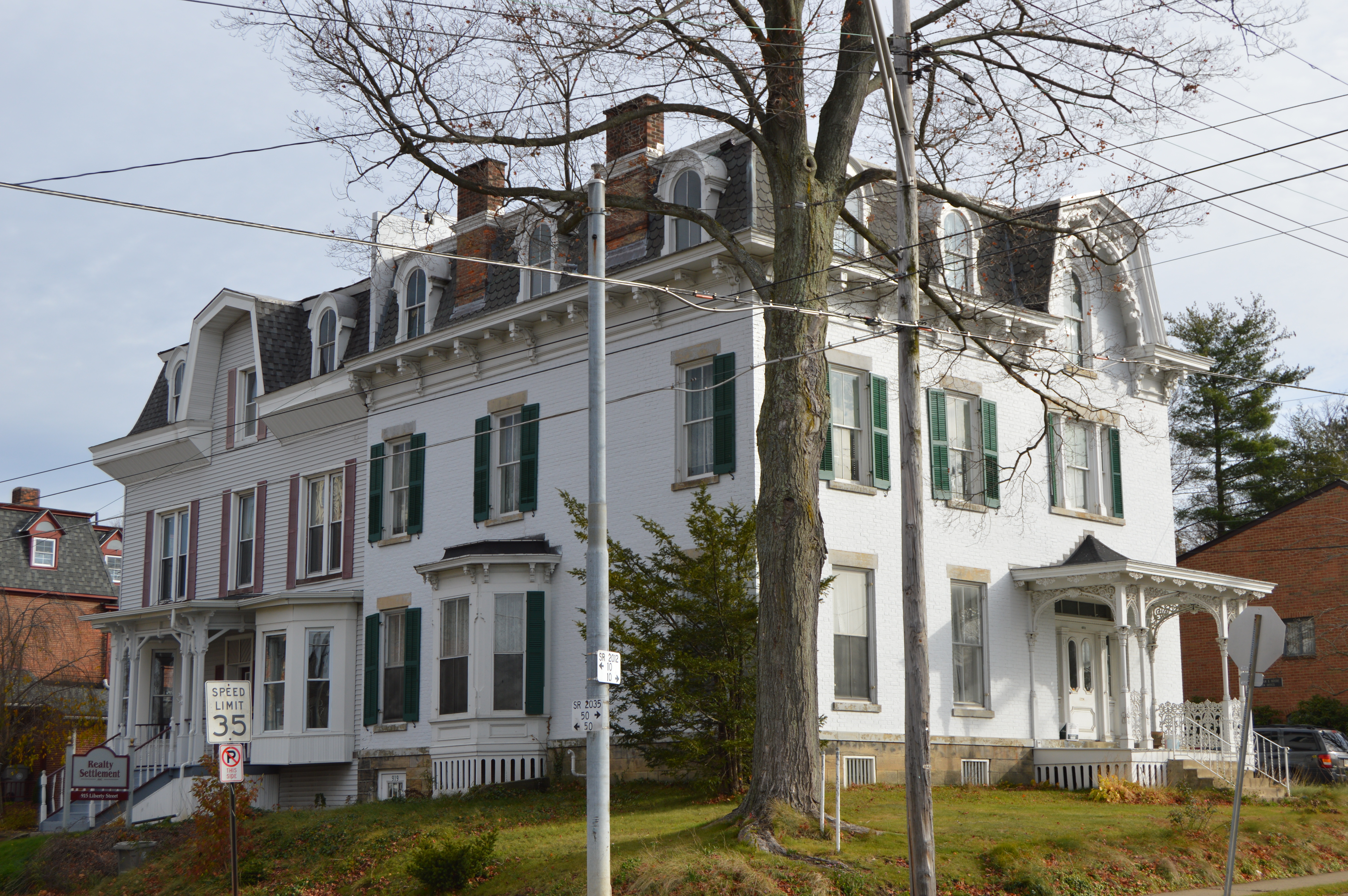
- View from the southwest

- Location within Pennsylvania Location within the United States
- Location: 403 Chestnut St., Meadville, Pennsylvania
- Coordinates: 41°38′14″N 80°8′52″W
- Area: 0.5 acres (0.20 ha)
- Built: 1838
- Built by: Shippen, Judge Henry
- Architectural style: Second Empire
- NRHP reference No.: 84003339
- Added to NRHP: June 6, 1984

Judge Henry Shippen House, also known as the Red Cross Building, is a historic home located at Meadville, Crawford County, Pennsylvania. It was built in 1838 and remodeled and expanded in 1875. It is a 2 1/2-story, brick dwelling with a mansard roof in the Second Empire style. It is three bays by six bays, and was originally in the Federal style.

It was added to the National Register of Historic Places in 1984.
