= Beaver and Erie Canal =

Former canal in Pennsylvania

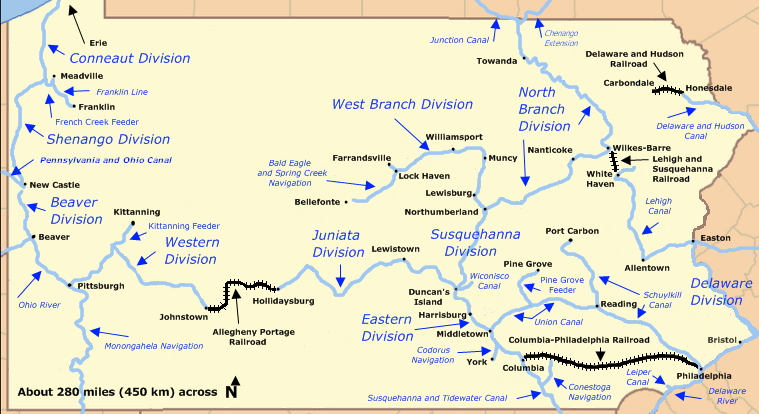
- Map of historic Pennsylvania canals
- Interactive map of Beaver and Erie Canal

Specifications
- Locks: 137
- Status: Historic, abandoned

History
- Original owner: Commonwealth of Pennsylvania
- Construction began: 1831
- Date completed: 1844
- Date closed: 1872

Geography
- Start point: Beaver, Pennsylvania
- End point: Erie, Pennsylvania
- Branch(es): Beaver, Shenango, and Conneaut Divisions
- Branch of: Pennsylvania Canal
- Connects to: Ohio River, Sandy and Beaver Canal, Pennsylvania and Ohio Canal, French Creek Feeder, Lake Erie
- Designations

Pennsylvania Historical Marker
- Designated: 1948

The Beaver and Erie Canal, also known as the Erie Extension Canal, was part of the Pennsylvania Canal system and consisted of three sections: the Beaver Division, the Shenango Division, and the Conneaut Division. The canal ran 136 miles (219 km) north–south near the western edge of the state from the Ohio River to Lake Erie through Beaver County, Lawrence County, Mercer County, Crawford County, and Erie County, Pennsylvania.

The southern terminus of the canal was the confluence of the Beaver River with the Ohio River in Beaver County about 20 miles (32 km) downstream from Pittsburgh, and the northern terminus was the city of Erie, in Erie County. The canal needed a total of 137 locks to overcome a change in elevation of 977 feet (298 m).

== History ==
Construction of the canal was meant to complete a transport network through northwestern Pennsylvania that would connect Lake Erie with the Ohio River; the Main Line of Public Works, a canal which joined Philadelphia to Pittsburgh; and the Erie Canal, which connected Albany, New York, to Lake Erie.

The Beaver Division, begun in 1831, extended 31 miles (50 km) from Beaver along the Beaver River and the Shenango River to Pulaski. In 1836, work began on the Shenango Division extension of 61 miles (98 km) from Pulaski to Conneaut Lake, and in 1838 contracts were awarded for the Conneaut Division to Erie, 45 miles (72 km) further north. Taking over the Conneaut Division from the state in 1843, the Erie Canal Company finished construction in 1844, when the entire length of the three divisions became open to traffic.

Two east–west canals connected to the Beaver and Erie. New Castle, which the Beaver and Erie served, was the eastern terminus of Pennsylvania and Ohio Canal, which ran 91 miles (146 km) west to the Ohio and Erie Canal in Ohio. Another east–west canal, the French Creek Feeder, brought additional water into Conneaut Lake at the same time it provided a transportation corridor. It ran 25 miles (40 km) from near Meadville, where it connected with the Franklin Line canal of 22 miles (35 km) running along French Creek to Franklin. At its southern terminus near Beaver, the Beaver and Erie was linked by the Ohio River to Pittsburgh and the principal east-west Pennsylvania transportation system of the time, the Main Line of Public Works.

Bringing new business to communities such as Conneautville, which shipped timber and hay to Pittsburgh, the Beaver and Erie Canal was heavily used in its early years but was hard to maintain. Competition from railroads and the collapse of an aqueduct over Elk Creek in Erie County led to the canal's abandonment in 1872.

== Remnants ==
Canal sections exist near Shenango River Lake near Hermitage. Well-preserved remains of Lock Number 10 are found in Sharpsville, about a 0.5 miles (0.8 km) south of the Shenango Dam. Maintained for hiking, the Shenango Trail follows the old canal towpath. It runs about 8 miles (13 km) along the east side of the Shenango River from Kidd's Mill Covered Bridge to the confluence of Lackawannock Creek and the river. Canal artifacts and a replica of a canal boat, the Rufus S. Reed, are on display at the Greenville Canal Museum in Greenville, on the Shenango River 72 miles (116 km) northwest of Pittsburgh. Some canal facilities at Bridgewater, at the canal's southern end, remain; they are a part of the Bridgewater Historic District.

== French Creek Feeder ==
Because Conneaut Lake, fed mainly by springs and small streams, did not have enough water to keep the Beaver and Erie Canal filled at its highest elevation, the state built a feeder canal. The French Creek Feeder, as it was called, ran from a dam built for the purpose on the Bemus farm, 2 miles (3 km) north of Meadville. Water from the dam pool, at a higher elevation than the lake, flowed south through Meadville. It crossed French Creek by aqueduct at Shaw's Landing, where locks enabled boats to transfer between the canal and the creek. Beyond the landing, the canal turned northwest and flowed into the lake. Engineering on these projects included raising the Conneaut Lake dam by 11 feet (3.4 m) and adding another short canal to carry water to a pumping station for the Beaver and Erie. The French Creek Feeder was completed to Meadville in 1828 and reached Conneaut Lake in 1834.

After the Beaver and Erie Canal was abandoned, the dam at Conneaut Lake was lowered. Also abandoned was the French Creek Feeder, though for a while it still flowed through Meadville. The Crawford County Historical Society has preserved a small part of the feeder canal.

== Franklin Line ==
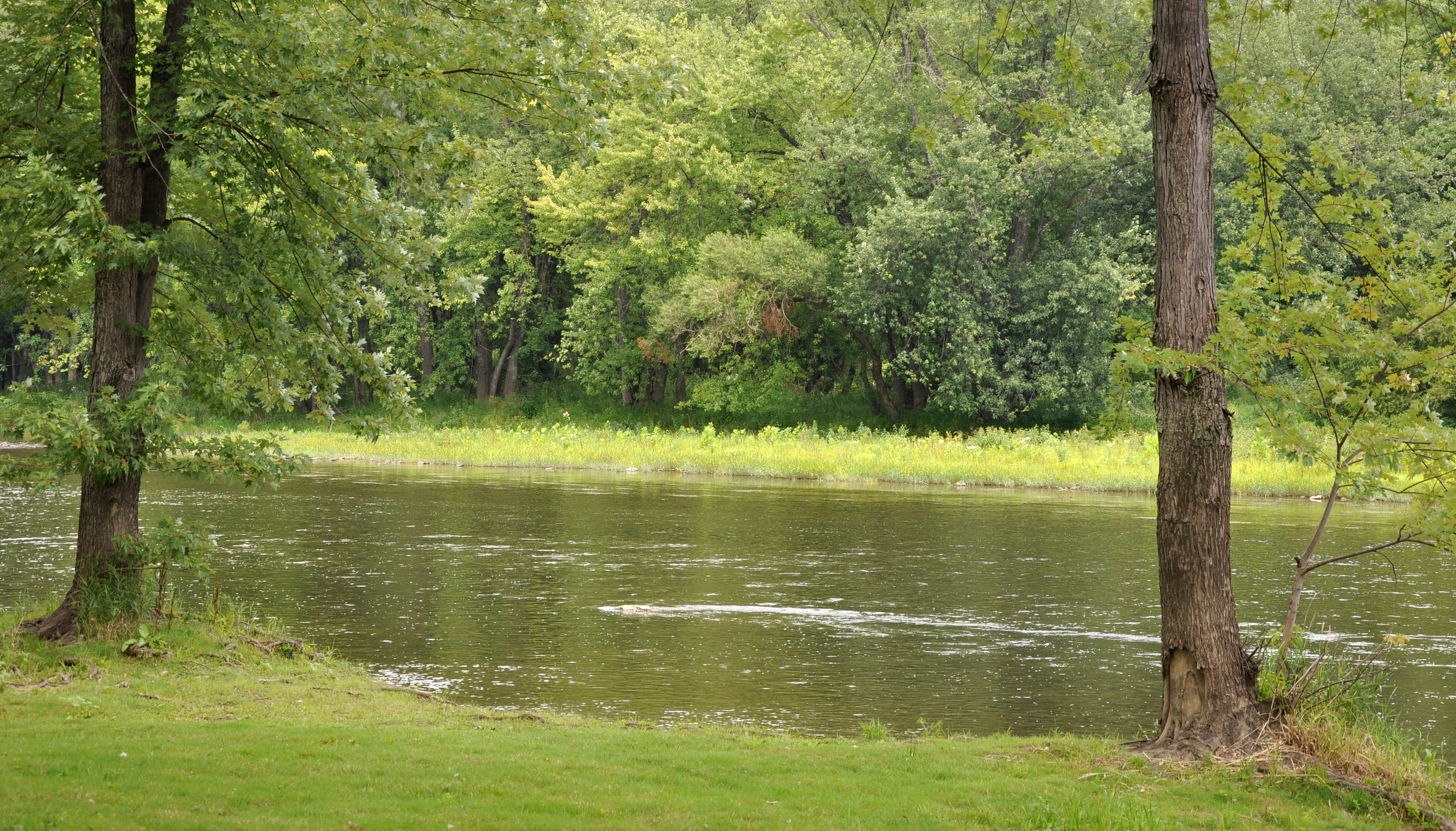
French Creek at Franklin in 2012

Downstream from Meadville lay the town of Franklin at the confluence of French Creek with the Allegheny River. Merchants there, concerned that the feeder canal and the main canal would divert business from Franklin, persuaded the state to build a system of locks and dams on French Creek below Shaw's Landing at Meadville. This canal, the Franklin Line, opened in 1833. Although the Franklin Line made it easier for boats to travel between Franklin and Meadville, it made it harder for rafts, which depended on river currents and were too big for the locks. Large boats also had trouble with the locks, and the creek often lacked sufficient water to carry them. In 1837, high water caused severe damage to the short-lived system, which was allowed to decline.

== Pymatuning Swamp ==
The canal passed along a causeway of 3 miles (4.8 km) through what later became Pymatuning State Park at Hartstown, Pennsylvania. The causeway was built through Pymatuning Swamp by the Erie Canal Company, effectively forming the 600 acres (2.4 km^{2}) of Pymatuning Reservoir west of the canal.

== Points of interest ==
Feature	Coordinates	Description
Erie	42°07′57″N 80°04′26″W	City at the northern terminus of the Beaver and Erie Canal
Greenville	41°24′16″N 80°23′28″W	City near the midpoint of the Beaver and Erie Canal
New Castle	40°59′39″N 80°20′02″W	City at the eastern terminus of the Pennsylvania and Ohio Canal
Beaver River mouth	40°41′49″N 80°17′21″W	Southern terminus of the Beaver and Erie Canal
Meadville	41°38′29″N 80°09′05″W	City on the French Creek Feeder; northern terminus of the Franklin Line
Franklin	41°23′52″N 79°49′53″W	City at the southern terminus of the Franklin Line

== See also ==
- List of canals in the United States
- Nicholson House and Inn
