= Baldwin–Reynolds House =

Historic house in Pennsylvania, US

- U.S. National Register of Historic Places
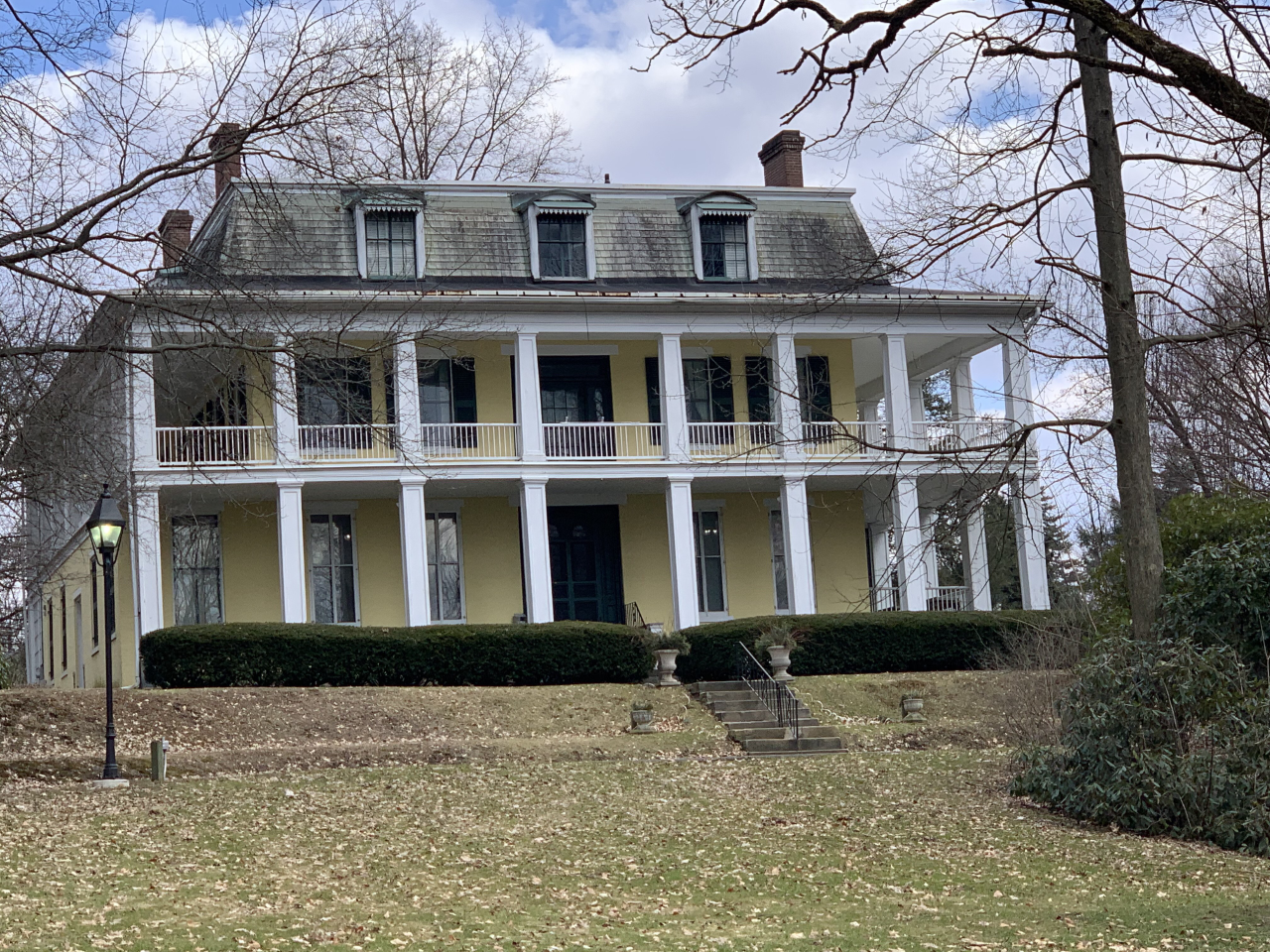
- House in 2019

- Location within Pennsylvania Location within the United States
- Interactive map showing the location of Baldwin-Reynolds House
- Location: 639 Terrace Street; Meadville, Pennsylvania
- Coordinates: 41°38′47.5″N 80°9′8.2″W
- Built: 1843
- Architectural style: Greek Revival
- NRHP reference No.: 74001777
- Added to NRHP: December 30, 1974

The Baldwin–Reynolds House is a historic home in Meadville, Pennsylvania, United States. It was built in 1843 by U.S. Supreme Court Justice Henry Baldwin, who died within months of its completion. After Baldwin's death, the house was used as a girls' school until it was sold to local businessman William Reynolds in 1847.

The house now serves as a museum. The Baldwin–Reynolds House offers free tours in the summer. It was home to two mayors. The Crawford County Historical Society purchased the home in 1963.

== History ==
The Meadville property on which the Baldwin–Reynolds House was built was purchased in 1840 from Squire Lord by Henry Baldwin, who had been appointed as a justice on the Supreme Court of the United States by President Andrew Jackson in 1830. The house was built for Baldwin in 1843 by an unknown architect. Baldwin died several months after moving into the house. After his passing, the mansion became a finishing school for girls.

The house was acquired by William Reynolds in 1847. Reynolds was the nephew of Baldwin's wife. William Reynolds and his wife Julia added a third story and, in 1866, renovated the house to change its roof styling and add further rooms. He would later serve as mayor of Meadville. After William Reynolds died, the he mansion remained in the Reynolds family: John Reynolds, son of William and Julia, became the home's next owner. John, who married Katherine Shryrock, was Meadville's mayor for three terms. Katherine helped establish Meadville Garden Club. In 1963, after they died, the Crawford County Historical Society purchased the home.

Antique Victorian fencing, valued at $15,000, was purchased at auction and donated to the museum. Portions had been installed around a garden on the museum's grounds before it was all stolen in May 2023. Two men were charged with the theft in June that year.

== Property ==
The three-story historic house museum and surrounding property is owned and managed by the Crawford County Historical Society, which keeps the museum open from Memorial Day until Labor Day. The Meadville Garden Club helps with upkeep on the grounds, which remain open all year. An annual "Fezziwig's Christmas Dinner" is held in the home.

The original two-story mansion was built in a "southern styled" Greek Revival style. The structure features an exterior of yellow brick. Baldwin's original construction was said to be a copy of Andrew Jackson's "Hunter's Hill" home in the Nashville area. During Reynold's 1866 renovation, the house's roof was changed from a hip roof to a mansard roof. The same renovation also added a stairway, a library, a conservatory, and new first-story entrance A gazebo dating to the 1890s used to stand in the property.

The museum's property occupies more than 3 acres (1.2 ha) adjacent to the house. The grounds includes a small pond known as Little Conneaut Lake and two Dutch copper beeches, the latter of which are more than a hundred years old. William Reynolds collected plants and landscaping items placed on the property during trips to Europe. A plan to purchase Victorian-era furnishings for placement on the grounds and develop the space into a botanical garden and arboretum was announced in 2022. In 2023, antique Victorian brass and iron fencing was partially installed around a garden on the property before it was stolen in May.

== See also ==
- Meadville Downtown Historic District
- National Register of Historic Places listings in Crawford County, Pennsylvania
