= Richmond Township, Crawford County, Pennsylvania =

Township in Pennsylvania, US

Coordinates: 41°45′01″N 80°00′59″W

- Township
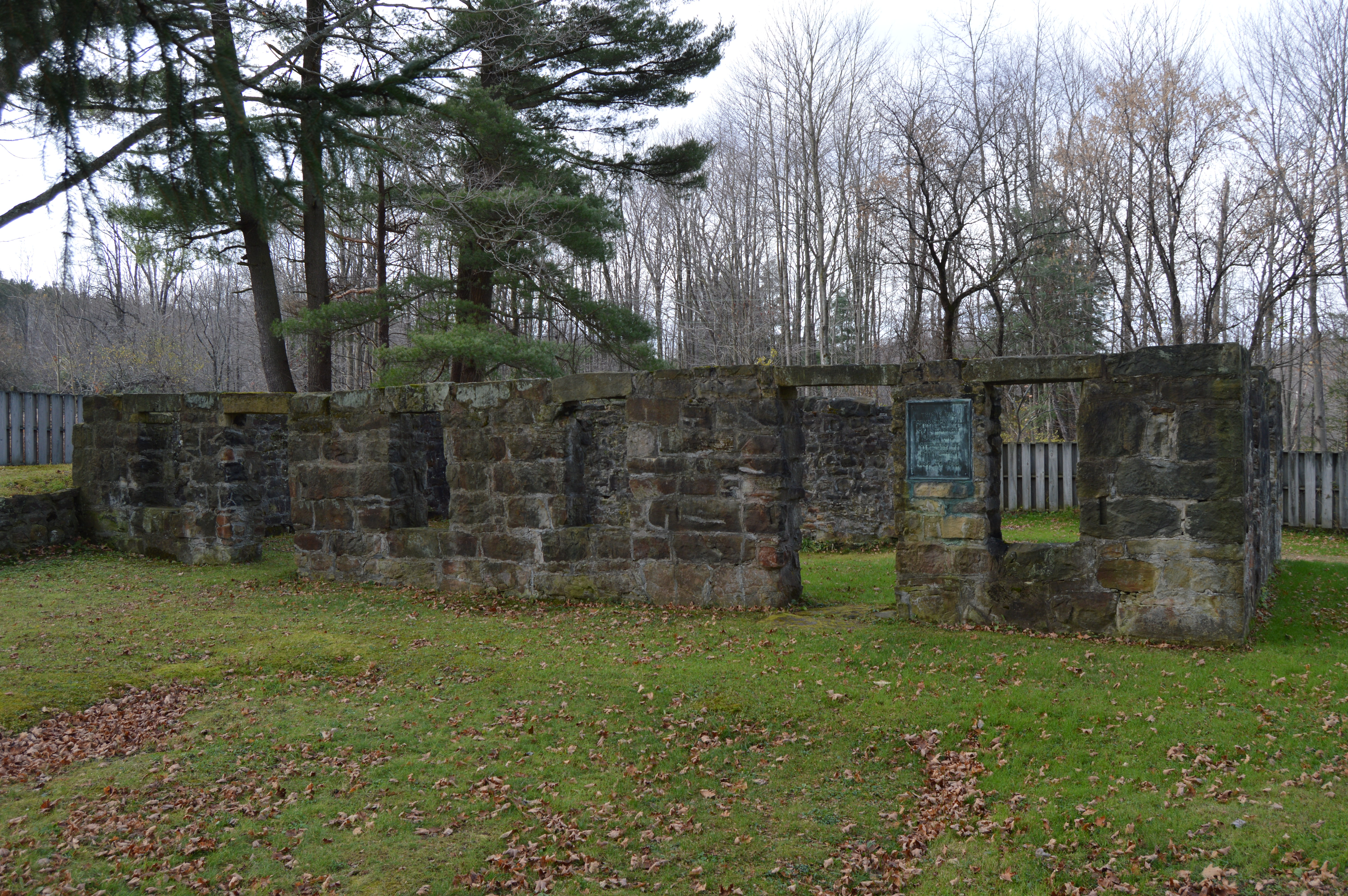
- Tannery owned by abolitionist John Brown

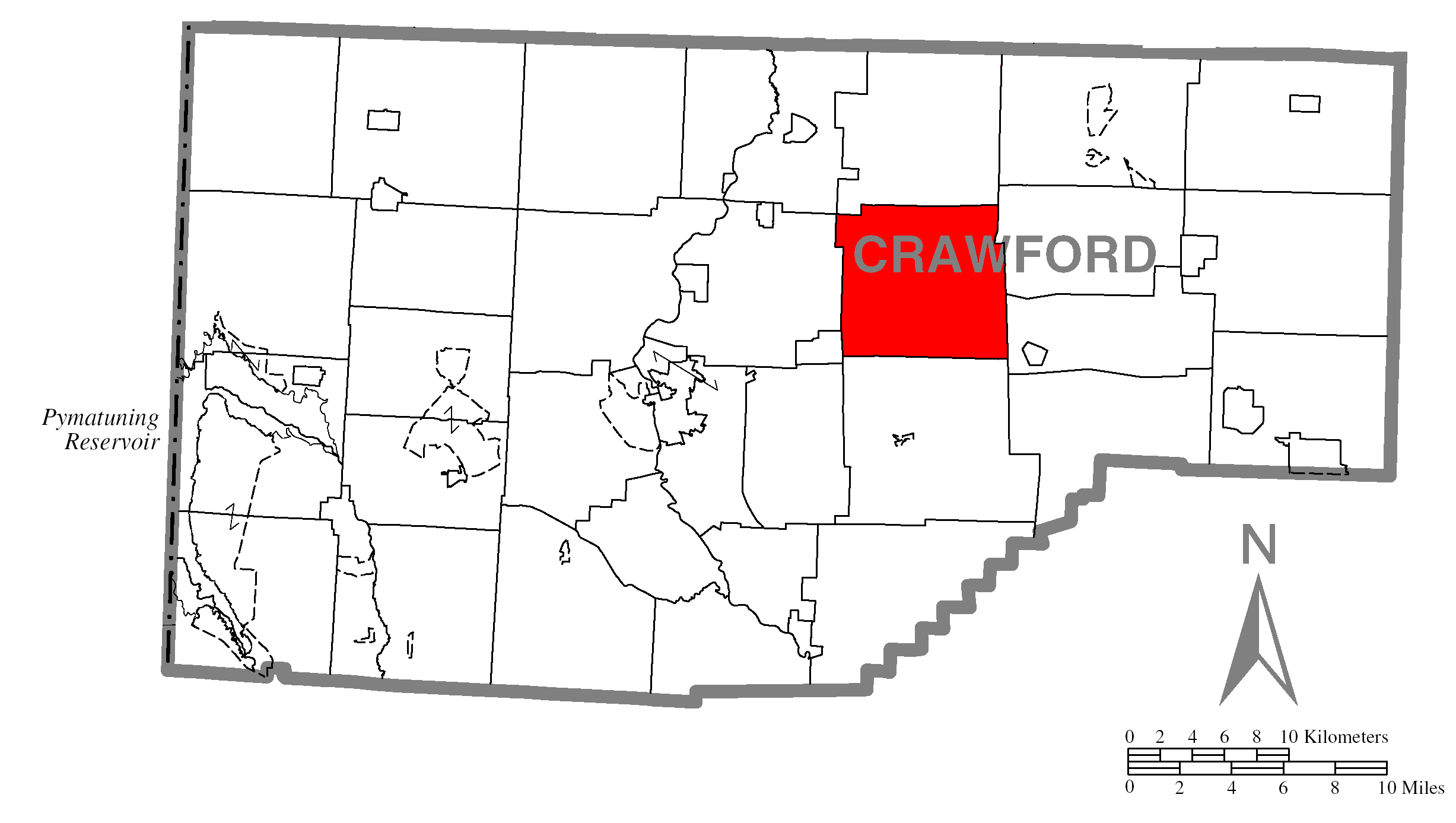
- Location of Richmond Township in Crawford County

- Location of Crawford County in Pennsylvania
- Country: United States
- State: Pennsylvania
- County: Crawford County

Area
  - Total: 36.84 sq mi (95.42 km^{2})
  - Land: 36.77 sq mi (95.24 km^{2})
  - Water: 0.069 sq mi (0.18 km^{2})
- Highest elevation (south South Richmond Corners): 1,670 ft (510 m)
- Lowest elevation (Eaton Corners): 1,160 ft (350 m)

Population (2020)
  - Total: 1,352 ▼
  - Estimate (2024): 1,328
  - Density: 39.0/sq mi (15.06/km^{2})
- Time zone: UTC-4 (EST)
  - Summer (DST): UTC-5 (EDT)
- Area code: 814
- FIPS code: 42-039-64600
- Website: www.richmondtownshipcc.com

Richmond Township is a township in Crawford County, Pennsylvania, United States. The population was 1,352 at the 2020 census, down from 1,475 at the 2010 census.

== History ==
The John Brown Tannery Site was listed on the National Register of Historic Places in 1978.

== Geography ==
The township is in the east-central part of Crawford County. According to the United States Census Bureau, the township has a total area of 36.8 square miles (95.2 km^{2}), of which 36.7 square miles (95.0 km^{2}) is land and 0.08 square miles (0.2 km^{2}), or 0.19%, is water.

=== Natural Features ===
Richmond Township is located in the Glaciated Plateau of Northwest Pennsylvania. Richmond Township is drained by Muddy Creek and its tributary, Mackey Run in the northeast, Woodcock Creek in the west and by Mohawk Run, a tributary of French Creek in the northwest corner. The lowest elevation, 1,168 ft (356 m), is located where Muddy Creek flows out of the township at Eaton Corners, while the highest elevation, 1,670 ft (510 m), is located on a high point south of South Richmond Corners. Muddy Creek rises within this township and Woodcock Creek flows through a "mini-gorge" in this township.

== Demographics ==
Historical population
Census	Pop.	Note	%±
2000	1,379		—
2010	1,475		7.0%
2020	1,352		−8.3%
2024 (est.)	1,328		−1.8%
U.S. Decennial Census

As of the census of 2000, there were 1,379 people, 515 households, and 397 families residing in the township. The population density was 37.7 inhabitants per square mile (14.6/km^{2}). There were 577 housing units at an average density of 15.8/sq mi (6.1/km^{2}). The racial makeup of the township was 99.49% White, 0.07% African American, 0.15% from other races, and 0.29% from two or more races. Hispanic or Latino of any race were 0.51% of the population.

There were 515 households, out of which 34.2% had children under the age of 18 living with them, 65.6% were married couples living together, 6.0% had a female householder with no husband present, and 22.9% were non-families. 17.5% of all households were made up of individuals, and 6.6% had someone living alone who was 65 years of age or older. The average household size was 2.68 and the average family size was 2.99.

In the township the population was spread out, with 27.2% under the age of 18, 6.2% from 18 to 24, 28.6% from 25 to 44, 26.8% from 45 to 64, and 11.2% who were 65 years of age or older. The median age was 38 years. For every 100 females there were 115.8 males. For every 100 females age 18 and over, there were 104.9 males.

The median income for a household in the township was $39,583, and the median income for a family was $43,958. Males had a median income of $33,056 versus $22,321 for females. The per capita income for the township was $17,292. About 3.5% of families and 5.8% of the population were below the poverty line, including 6.4% of those under age 18 and 5.3% of those age 65 or over.
