= Titusville Historic District (Titusville, Pennsylvania) =

Historic district in Pennsylvania, United States

- U.S. National Register of Historic Places
- U.S. Historic district
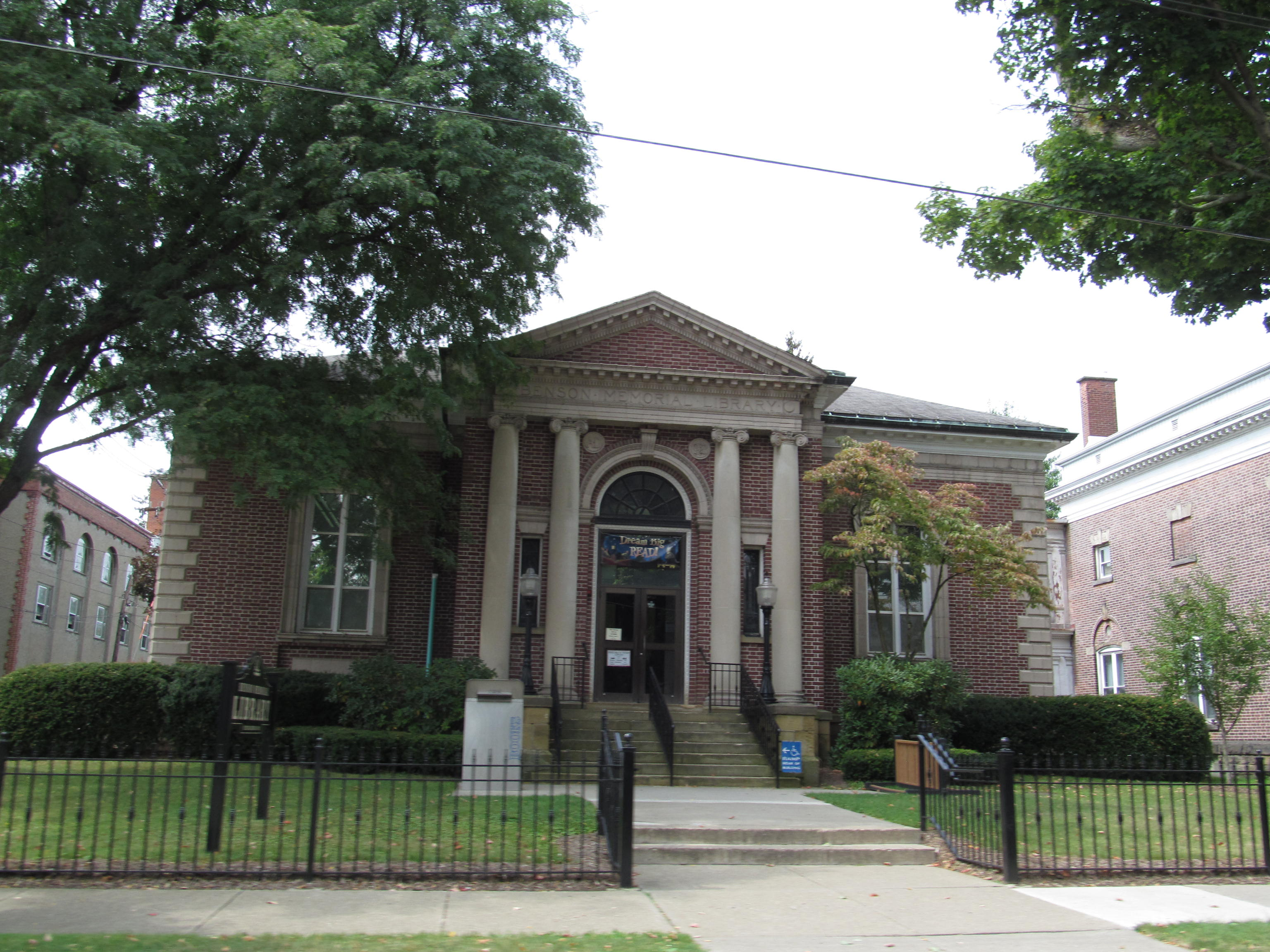
- Benson Memorial Library

- Location within Pennsylvania Location within the United States
- Location: Roughly bounded by Petroleum, Spruce, Franklin, Perry, Monroe, Main and Spring Sts., Titusville, Pennsylvania
- Coordinates: 41°37′47″N 79°40′26″W
- Area: 170 acres (69 ha)
- Built: 1859
- Architect: Multiple
- Architectural style: Late 19th And 20th Century Revivals, Late Victorian
- NRHP reference No.: 85000178
- Added to NRHP: January 31, 1985

The Titusville Historic District is a national historic district that is located in Titusville, Crawford County, Pennsylvania.

It was added to the National Register of Historic Places in 1985.

== History and architectural features ==
This district encompasses 472 contributing buildings that are located in the central business district and surrounding residential areas of Titusville, Pennsylvania including a mix of residential, commercial, industrial, and institutional buildings with the majority built after the Drake Well was established in 1859. They were designed in a variety of popular architectural styles, including Greek Revival, Italianate, Queen Anne, and Colonial Revival.

Notable buildings include the William Barnsdell House (c. 1855), the First National Bank, R.D. Fletcher's Store, the Universalist Church (1865), The Corinthian Hall, Chase and Stewart Block, the Kernochan and Company Building (c. 1900), the Penn Movie Theater (1939), Pennsylvania Bank & Trust Co., the Swedish Congregationalist Church, and the Emerson House. Also located in the district but separately listed is the Titusville City Hall.
