= Roueche House =

Historic house in Pennsylvania, United States

- U.S. National Register of Historic Places
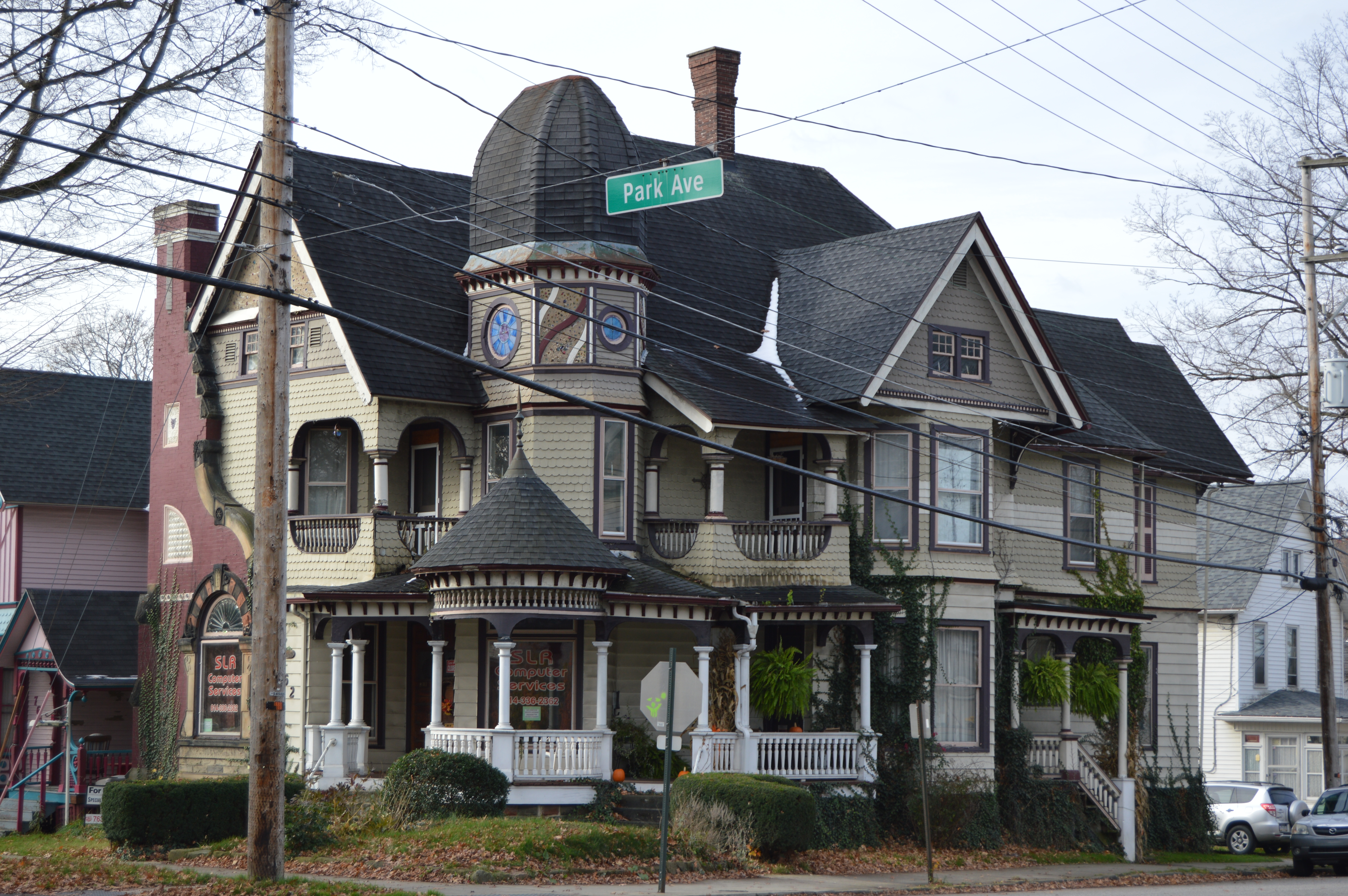
- Northern side and front

- Location within Pennsylvania Location within the United States
- Location: 762 Park Ave., Meadville, Pennsylvania
- Coordinates: 41°38′33″N 80°9′4″W
- Area: 0.1 acres (0.040 ha)
- Built: 1899
- Built by: Roueche Bros.; Huttlemayer, Albert A.; Froidevaux, Julien.
- Architectural style: Queen Anne
- NRHP reference No.: 82003784
- Added to NRHP: March 4, 1982

Roueche House is an historic home located at Meadville, Crawford County, Pennsylvania. It was built in 1899, and is a 2½-story, irregular frame dwelling in the Queen Anne style. It is clad in brick, clapboard, fishscale shingles, and pebble-dash panels. Its facade features a large curved brick chimney, multi-gabled and hipped roofs, balconies and round projecting porch, and a three-story hexagonal tower.

It was added to the National Register of Historic Places in 1982.
