= Independent Congregational Church =

Historic church in Pennsylvania, United States

- U.S. National Register of Historic Places
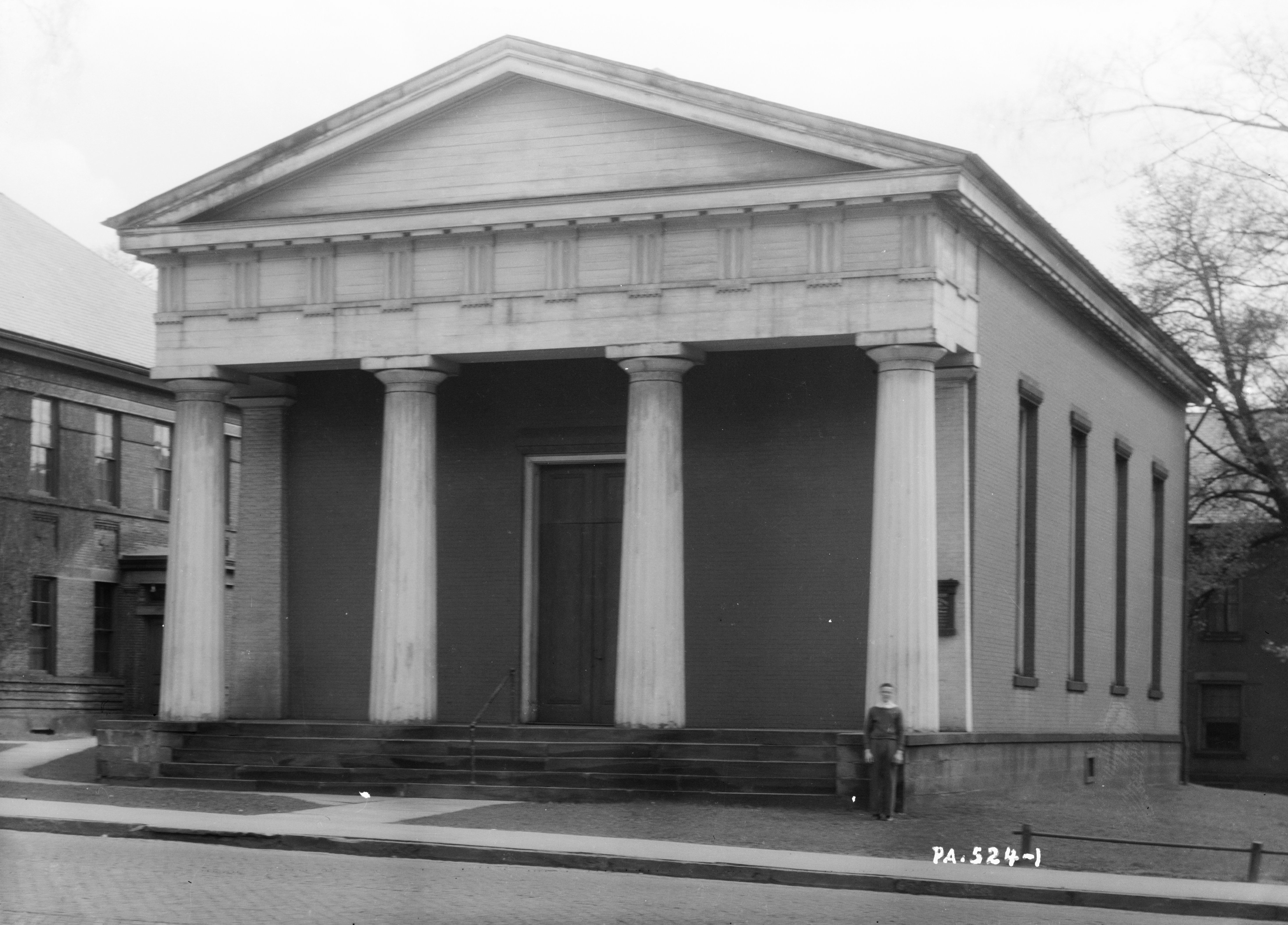
- Independent Congregational Church, 1936

- Location within Pennsylvania Location within the United States
- Location: 346 Chestnut St., Meadville, Pennsylvania
- Coordinates: 41°38′14″N 80°9′1″W
- Area: 0.2 acres (0.081 ha)
- Built: 1835-1836
- Architect: Derby, Edward; Cullum, Capt., George W.
- Architectural style: Greek Revival
- NRHP reference No.: 78002381
- Added to NRHP: March 8, 1978

The Independent Congregational Church, also known as the Unitarian Church of Meadville, is an historic Congregational church which is located at 346 Chestnut Street in Meadville, Crawford County, Pennsylvania.

It was added to the National Register of Historic Places in 1978.

== History and architectural features ==
Built between 1835 and 1836, this historic structure is a large, squarish, red brick building with a portico with Doric order columns supporting a pediment. A Greek Revival-style building, this church was designed by Gen. George Washington Cullum (1809-1892), who also designed Fort Sumter. The congregation was a supporter of the Meadville Theological School.
