= Meadville, Pennsylvania =

City in Pennsylvania, US

- City
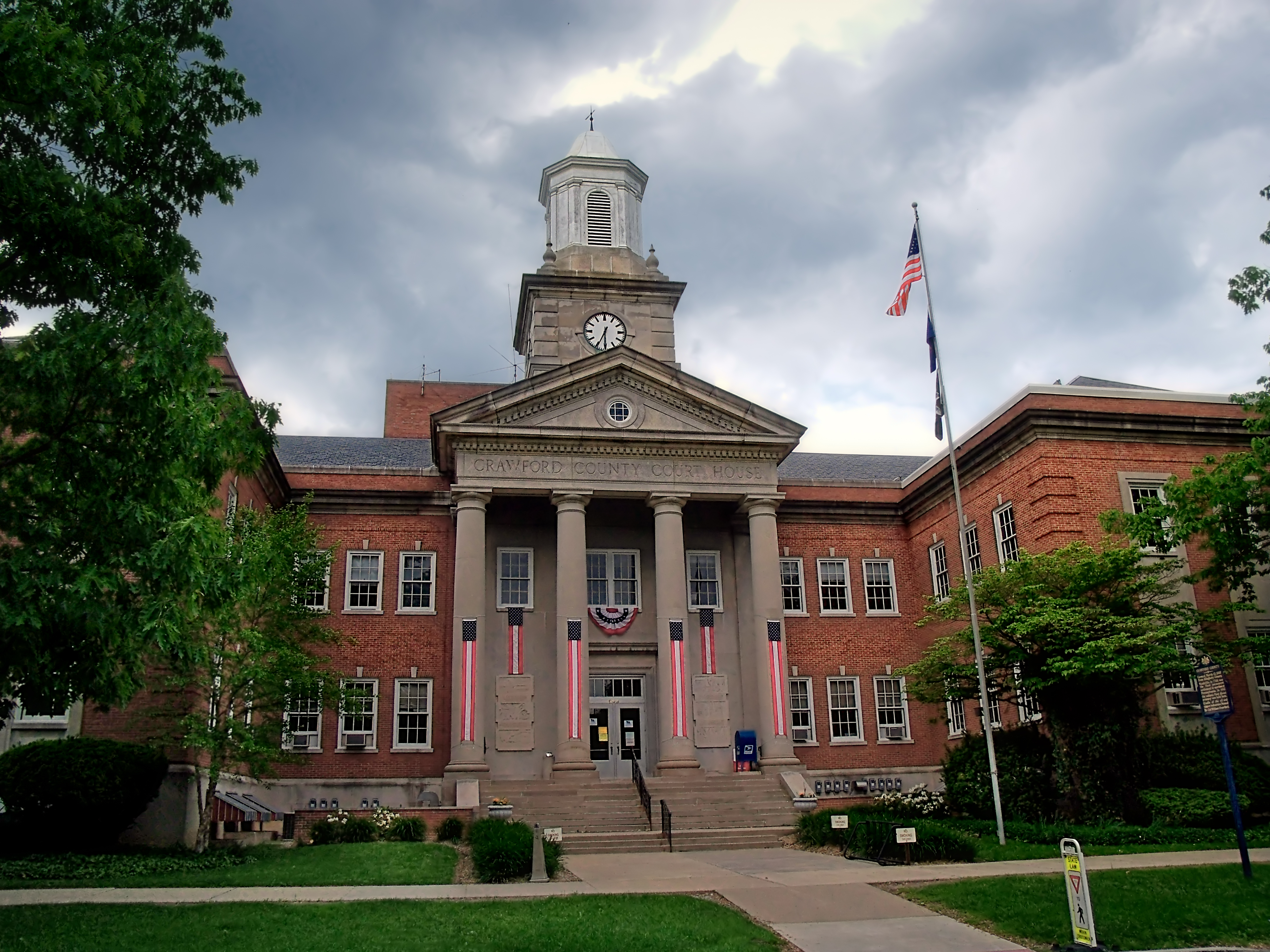
- Crawford County Courthouse, Meadville Downtown Historic District

- Flag Seal
- Nickname: Tool City
- Location of Meadville in Crawford County, Pennsylvania

- Location in Pennsylvania Location in the United States
- Coordinates: 41°39′N 80°9′W
- Country: United States
- State: Pennsylvania
- County: Crawford
- Settled: May 12, 1788; 238 years ago
- Named for: David Mead, founder

Government
  - Mayor: Jaime Kinder (D)

Area
  - Total: 4.37 sq mi (11.31 km^{2})
  - Land: 4.36 sq mi (11.30 km^{2})
  - Water: 0.0039 sq mi (0.01 km^{2})
- Elevation: 1,400 ft (430 m)

Population (2020)
  - Total: 13,050
  - Estimate (2023): 12,361
  - Density: 2,991.9/sq mi (1,155.16/km^{2})
- Time zone: UTC-5 (EST)
  - Summer (DST): UTC-4 (EDT)
- ZIP Codes: 16335, 16388
- Area code: 814
- FIPS code: 42-48360
- Website: www.cityofmeadville.org

Pennsylvania Historical Marker
- Designated: November 1, 1946

Meadville is a city in Crawford County, Pennsylvania, United States, and its county seat. The population was 13,050 at the 2020 census. The first permanent settlement in Northwestern Pennsylvania, Meadville is within 40 miles (64 km) of Erie and within 90 miles (140 km) of Pittsburgh. It is the principal city of the Meadville micropolitan area, as well as part of the larger Erie–Meadville combined statistical area.

== History ==
=== Settlement and establishment ===
The Meadville area was the ancestral land of the Eriechronon people until the Iroquois Confederacy forced them out. Having been displaced from their ancestral lands in what is now Eastern Pennsylvania, the Lenape moved into the now unoccupied region. They formed an alliance with the neighboring Seneca, one of the five tribes that made up the Iroquois Confederacy, and other displaced Lenape. Under the leadership of Chief Custaloga, they founded the settlement of Cussewago. Custaloga's name first appeared in western Pennsylvania's history in George Washington's journal of 1754. When Washington arrived in the village of Venango (Fort Machault), Custaloga was in charge of the wampum of his nation. This wampum was a message that was sent to the Six Nations if the French refused to leave the land. Custaloga was the chief of the Munsee or Wolf Clan of Delawares and he also ruled over the Delawares at the town of Cussewago, at the present site of Meadville.

After Cussewago was abandoned, Meadville was laid out by William McArthur Sr. and settled on May 12, 1788, by a party of settlers led by David Mead. Its location at the confluence of Cussewago Creek and French Creek was only a day's travel by boat to the safety of Fort Franklin. The neighboring Iroquois and Lenape befriended the isolated settlement, but their enemies, including the Wyandots, were not so amiable. The threat of their attacks caused the settlement to be evacuated for a time in 1791. Around 1800, many of the settlers to the Meadville area came after receiving land bounties for service in the American Revolutionary War. Allegheny College was founded in April 1815 by Timothy Alden. Meadville became an important transportation center after the construction of the French Creek Feeder Canal in 1837 and of the Beaver and Erie Canal it connected to at Conneaut Lake and subsequent railroad development.

In the late 18th and early 19th centuries, Meadville played a small part in the Underground Railroad helping escaping slaves to freedom. An event in September 1880 led to the end of segregation by race in the state's public schools. At the South Ward schools, Elias Allen tried unsuccessfully to enroll his two children. He appealed to the Crawford County Court of Common Pleas, and Judge Pearson Church declared unconstitutional the 1854 state law mandating separate schools for Negro children. This law was amended, effective July 4, 1881, to prohibit such segregation.

=== Industrial growth ===
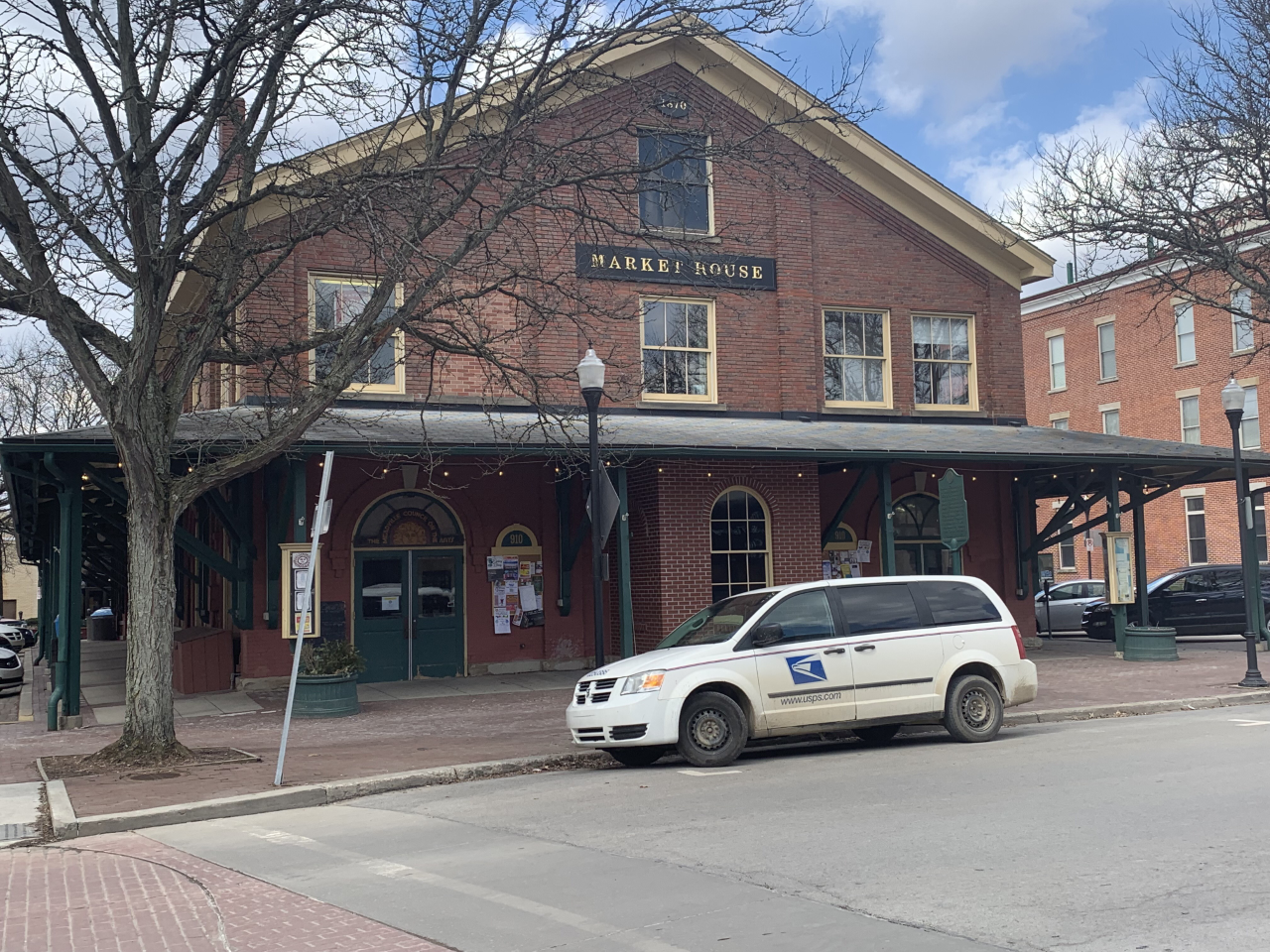
Meadville Market House

The League of Friendship, Mechanical Order of the Sun, a fraternal beneficiary labor organization was formed at Meadville in April 1868, and dissolved in October, with the establishment of the Ancient Order of United Workmen as the succeeding organization.

By the late 19th century, Meadville's economy was also driven by logging, agriculture, and iron production. The Talon Corporation, headquartered in Meadville, played a major role in the development of the zipper. Since the clothing industry was largely unaffected by the Great Depression, the community saw a population boom at that time. During World War II, the nearby Keystone Ordnance plant brought additional jobs to the area.

The high demand for zippers created favorable conditions for the Talon Company, and so became Meadville's most crucial industry. The company encountered significant difficulties after it was absorbed by Textron industries in 1968, eventually ending up bankrupt. However, as a result of the need for close tolerances and tool and die makers, a cottage industry of tool and die shops was established which resulted in Meadville, earning the city the nickname Tool City with more tool shops per capita than any place else in the United States.

In 1886, a blacksmith from Evansburg, Pennsylvania, George B. DeArment, began hand-forging farrier's tools and selling them from town to town out of the back of a wagon. The business eventually became known as the Champion Bolt and Clipper Company. In 1904, now named Channellock, the company moved to a 12,000-square-foot (1,100 m^{2}) facility in Meadville and added nippers, pinchers, and open-end wrenches to its product line. George B. DeArment's two sons, Almon W. and J. Howard DeArment became partners in the company in 1911 and expanded the product line again to include hammers. In 1923, the company moved again to a 33,000-square-foot (3,100 m^{2}) facility at its current location. Four years later, the name of the company was changed to the Champion–DeArment Tool Company.

Talon remained a major employer, along with the Erie Railroad, American Viscose Corporation (later known as Avtex Fibers), Channellock tools, and Dad's Pet Food. The area actually saw an increase in population during the Great Depression and the economy continued to grow past World War II. By the early 1990s, Channellock and Dad's were the only large companies operating in Meadville. This blow to the local economy was softened by a subsequent surge in light industry, mainly tool and die machine shops. The song "Bittersweet Motel" by Vermont jam band, Phish, was inspired when keyboardist Page McConnell left a wedding in Meadville and drove to the Pittsburgh Airport.

In addition to the Meadville Downtown Historic District, several buildings are listed on the National Register of Historic Places: Baldwin-Reynolds House, Bentley Hall (Allegheny College), Independent Congregational Church, Dr. J. R. Mosier Office, Roueche House, Ruter Hall (Allegheny College), and Judge Henry Shippen House.

== Geography ==
Meadville is located at 41°39′N 80°9′W (41.642, −80.147).

According to the United States Census Bureau, the city has a total area of 4.4 square miles (11 km^{2}), all land.

=== Climate ===
According to the Köppen Climate Classification system, Meadville has a warm-summer humid continental climate, abbreviated "Dfb" on climate maps. The hottest temperature recorded in Meadville was 104 °F (40.0 °C) on July 9, 1936, while the coldest temperature recorded was −23 °F (−30.6 °C) on January 31, 1948.

Climate data for Port Meadville Airport, Pennsylvania, 1991–2020 normals, extremes 1928–present
Month	Jan	Feb	Mar	Apr	May	Jun	Jul	Aug	Sep	Oct	Nov	Dec	Year
Record high °F (°C)	72 (22)	73 (23)	82 (28)	92 (33)	94 (34)	99 (37)	104 (40)	98 (37)	98 (37)	88 (31)	81 (27)	72 (22)	104 (40)
Mean maximum °F (°C)	56.6 (13.7)	56.9 (13.8)	68.4 (20.2)	78.5 (25.8)	84.2 (29.0)	87.8 (31.0)	89.6 (32.0)	87.5 (30.8)	85.2 (29.6)	77.3 (25.2)	66.8 (19.3)	57.3 (14.1)	90.5 (32.5)
Mean daily maximum °F (°C)	32.5 (0.3)	35.1 (1.7)	43.8 (6.6)	57.6 (14.2)	68.6 (20.3)	75.8 (24.3)	80.4 (26.9)	78.3 (25.7)	71.5 (21.9)	59.9 (15.5)	47.5 (8.6)	37.0 (2.8)	57.3 (14.1)
Daily mean °F (°C)	25.4 (−3.7)	27.2 (−2.7)	35.2 (1.8)	47.4 (8.6)	58.2 (14.6)	66.1 (18.9)	70.5 (21.4)	68.8 (20.4)	62.2 (16.8)	51.1 (10.6)	40.3 (4.6)	30.9 (−0.6)	48.6 (9.2)
Mean daily minimum °F (°C)	18.4 (−7.6)	19.3 (−7.1)	26.5 (−3.1)	37.2 (2.9)	47.8 (8.8)	56.4 (13.6)	60.5 (15.8)	59.3 (15.2)	52.8 (11.6)	42.3 (5.7)	33.1 (0.6)	24.8 (−4.0)	39.9 (4.4)
Mean minimum °F (°C)	−0.6 (−18.1)	1.7 (−16.8)	7.5 (−13.6)	23.4 (−4.8)	33.4 (0.8)	42.2 (5.7)	50.1 (10.1)	48.2 (9.0)	40.1 (4.5)	30.3 (−0.9)	19.4 (−7.0)	8.2 (−13.2)	−3.6 (−19.8)
Record low °F (°C)	−23 (−31)	−22 (−30)	−12 (−24)	5 (−15)	21 (−6)	29 (−2)	38 (3)	33 (1)	26 (−3)	17 (−8)	−1 (−18)	−19 (−28)	−23 (−31)
Average precipitation inches (mm)	2.52 (64)	1.96 (50)	2.90 (74)	3.81 (97)	3.73 (95)	4.39 (112)	4.91 (125)	3.73 (95)	4.16 (106)	3.74 (95)	2.98 (76)	2.59 (66)	41.42 (1,055)
Average precipitation days (≥ 0.01 in)	14.2	13.5	13.7	14.9	14.6	13.6	13.8	12.6	12.1	15.3	14.5	15.6	168.4
Source 1: NOAA
Source 2: National Weather Service

== Demographics ==
Historical population
Census	Pop.	Note	%±
1810	457		—
1820	649		42.0%
1830	1,076		65.8%
1840	1,319		22.6%
1850	2,578		95.5%
1860	3,702		43.6%
1870	7,103		91.9%
1880	8,860		24.7%
1890	9,520		7.4%
1900	10,291		8.1%
1910	12,780		24.2%
1920	14,568		14.0%
1930	16,698		14.6%
1940	18,919		13.3%
1950	18,972		0.3%
1960	16,671		−12.1%
1970	16,573		−0.6%
1980	15,544		−6.2%
1990	14,318		−7.9%
2000	13,685		−4.4%
2010	13,388		−2.2%
2020	13,050		−2.5%
2023 (est.)	12,361		−5.3%

=== 2020 census ===
As of the 2020 census, Meadville had a population of 13,050. The population density was 2,991.75 people per square mile (1,155.16/km^{2}). The median age was 36.5 years. 18.4% of residents were under the age of 18 and 18.6% of residents were 65 years of age or older. For every 100 females there were 89.3 males, and for every 100 females age 18 and over there were 85.7 males age 18 and over.

100.0% of residents lived in urban areas, while 0.0% lived in rural areas.

There were 5,330 households in Meadville, of which 23.8% had children under the age of 18 living in them. Of all households, 29.1% were married-couple households, 24.0% were households with a male householder and no spouse or partner present, and 37.4% were households with a female householder and no spouse or partner present. About 42.6% of all households were made up of individuals and 17.0% had someone living alone who was 65 years of age or older. The average household size was 2.25, and the average family size was 2.90.

There were 6,009 housing units, of which 11.3% were vacant. The homeowner vacancy rate was 3.0% and the rental vacancy rate was 7.7%.

Racial composition as of the 2020 census
Race	Number	Percent
White	11,063	84.8%
Black or African American	818	6.3%
American Indian and Alaska Native	19	0.1%
Asian	111	0.9%
Native Hawaiian and Other Pacific Islander	7	0.1%
Some other race	159	1.2%
Two or more races	873	6.7%
Hispanic or Latino (of any race)	402	3.1%

=== Income and poverty ===
According to the U.S. Census American Community Survey, for the period 2016-2020 the estimated median annual income for a household in the city was $40,694, and the median income for a family was $52,255. About 19.6% of the population were living below the poverty line, including 24.2% of those under age 18 and 9.1% of those 65 or over. About 49.2% of the population were employed, and 24.5% had a bachelor's degree or higher.

=== 2010 census ===
As of the census of 2010, there were 13,338 people, 5,376 households, and 2,891 families residing in the city. The population density was 3,060.1 inhabitants per square mile (1,181.5/km^{2}). There were 5,985 housing units at an average density of 1,375.5 per square mile (531.1/km^{2}). The racial makeup of the city was 87.5% (11,487) White, 5.28% African American, 0.18% Native American, 2.4% (320) Asian, 0.04% Pacific Islander, 0.34% from other races, and 3.2% (420) from two or more races. Hispanic or Latino of any race were 2.4% (5) of the population.

There were 5,376 households, out of which 17.7% had children under the age of 18 living with them, 36.5% were married couples living together, 13.4% had a female householder with no husband present, and 46.8% were non-families. 38.4% of all households were made up of individuals, and 16.9% had someone living alone who was 65 years of age or older. The average household size was 2.18 and the average family size was 2.86.

In the city the population was spread out, with 19.4% under the age of 18, 20.0% from 18 to 24, 22.0% from 25 to 44, 19.9% from 45 to 64, and 18.7% who were 65 years of age or older. The median age was 36 years. There are currently 6,171 males (46.6%) while there are currently 7,067 females (53.4%).

The median income for a household in the city was $33,848, and the median income for a family was $54,069. Males had a median income of $32,813 versus $22,579 for females. The per capita income for the city was $17,290. About 13.7% of families and 22.7% of the population were below the poverty line, including 25.3% of those under age 18 and 13.3% of those age 65 or over.

== Arts and culture ==
A replica of founder David Mead's log cabin, the first permanent settlement in northwestern Pennsylvania, is located at Bicentennial Park along the banks of French Creek. The replica was built as a part of Meadville's Bicentennial celebration in 1988. The cabin is used as an educational resource for school tours and the general public.

The Market House is a prominent historical building located in downtown Meadville. It is the oldest continuously run market structure in the state of Pennsylvania, and still serves as a hub for local farmers. Farmers markets are still held on Saturdays.

The Baldwin-Reynolds House, managed by the Crawford County Historical Society, is a house museum in town. The building was constructed in 1843 by Heney Baldwin, an associate justice of the U.S. Supreme Court, a few months before his death in 1844.

== Parks and recreation ==
Diamond Park is Meadville's central park and has been used for a variety of different purposes for over two centuries. In the 19th century, the park was used as militia drill grounds leading up to and during the Civil War. After the Civil War was over, Diamond Park became more open to the public with grass, statues, monuments and a gazebo. It is now used as a recreational park for the community.

== Education ==
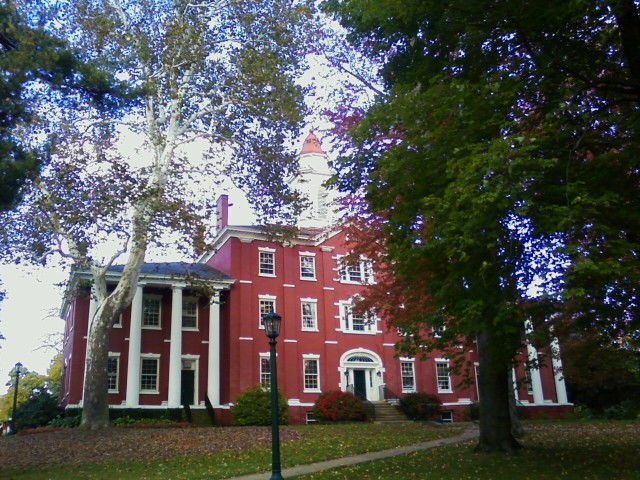
Bentley Hall on the campus of Allegheny College

=== Colleges ===
Meadville is the home of Allegheny College, a liberal arts college with approximately 1,700 students. Allegheny was founded in April 1815 by the Reverend Timothy Alden, a graduate of Harvard's School of Divinity. The college was historically affiliated with the United Methodist Church after 1833, although it is currently non-sectarian. The first class, consisting of four male students, began their studies on July 4, 1816, without any formal academic buildings. Within six years, Alden accumulated sufficient funds to begin building a campus. The first building erected, the library, was designed by Alden himself, and is a notable example of early American architecture. Bentley Hall is named in honor of Dr. William Bentley, who donated his private library to the college, a collection of considerable value and significance. In 1824, Thomas Jefferson wrote to Alden, expressing the hope that his University of Virginia could someday possess the richness of Allegheny's library. Alden served as president of the college until 1831, when financial and enrollment difficulties forced his resignation. Ruter Hall was built in 1853.

Meadville Theological School was established in 1844 by a wealthy businessman and Unitarian named Harm Jan Huidekoper. It moved to Chicago in 1926.

=== Primary and secondary ===
Public schools, all part of the Crawford Central School District, which covers the city:

- Meadville Area Senior High School (grades 9–12)
- Meadville Middle School (grades 7–8)
- First District Elementary School (grades K-6)
- Neason Hill Elementary School (grades K-6)
- Second District Elementary School (grades K-6)
- West End Elementary School (grades K-6)

Private/charter schools:

- Crawford Christian Academy (grades K-12)
- Seton Catholic School (grades K-8)
- The Learning Center K-8 Independent School (grades K-8)

== Notable people ==
- Roger Alden, early settler, Holland Land Company resident agent 1795-1804
- Meghan Allen, Playboy model
- Henry Baldwin, Supreme Court justice, lone dissenter in the Amistad case
- John Joseph Bittner, geneticist and cancer biologist, who studied the genetics of breast cancer
- Journey Brown, Penn State running back and Cotton Bowl Classic MVP
- Mary Ann Day Brown (1816-1884), wife of abolitionist John Brown
- Sal Campfield, Major League baseball player
- Cameron Carpenter, Grammy-nominated organistabe
- Annie W. Clark (1843-1907), temperance leader
- James Clark, Jesuit and president of the College of the Holy Cross
- Ernestine Cobern Beyer, poet and children's author
- George Washington Cullum U.S. Army general from the Civil War
- Bill Daddio American Football Player, Coach, and Scout
- John Dick, U.S. Congressman from Pennsylvania
- Samuel Bernard Dick, U.S. Congressman from Pennsylvania
- Lavantia Densmore Douglass (1827–1899), social reformer
- Jack Dunn, Major League pitcher and Minor League Baseball team owner
- R. Budd Dwyer, Treasurer of Pennsylvania from 1981 to 1987
- Todd Erdos, Major League Baseball player
- John Wilson Farrelly, U.S. Representative for Pennsylvania's 22nd congressional district from 1847 to 1849
- Patrick Farrelly, U.S. Representative for Pennsylvania's 18th congressional district from 1823 to 1826
- Randy Fichtner, former Offensive Coordinator of the Pittsburgh Steelers, graduate of Meadville Area Senior High
- Charles Homer Haskins, historian, advisor to President Woodrow Wilson
- Todd Holland, television and film director and producer
- Carl Hovde (1926–2009), professor and dean during the Columbia University protests of 1968
- Harm Jan Huidekoper, Holland Land Company resident agent, 1804-1836, land developer, Unitarian leader
- Henry Shippen Huidekoper, Lieutenant Colonel of the 150th PA Volunteer Infantry Regiment. Awarded the Medal of Honor for meritorious service on July 1, 1863, at the Battle of Gettysburg
- Emma Hunter, 19th-century telegraph operator
- Lynn Jones, former Major League Baseball player
- Robert F. Kent, former state representative and state treasurer
- Virginia Kirkus, creator of Kirkus Reviews
- Wade Manning, former National Football League player
- Alexander S. McDill, congressman from Wisconsin
- Ross A. McGinnis, US Army soldier who was killed in the Iraq War December 4, 2006, and was posthumously awarded the United States' highest decoration for bravery, the Medal of Honor.
- Jack Michaels, National Hockey League radio and television announcer with the Edmonton Oilers.
- Tammy Pescatelli, comedian
- Branch Rickey, Baseball executive
- Raymond P. Shafer, former governor of Pennsylvania
- Michael S. Smith, jazz drummer and percussionist
- Gladys Marie Stein, author and composer
- Sharon Stone (1958-), actress
- Gideon Sundback, member of the National Inventors Hall of Fame for his work on the development of the zipper
- Jay Tessmer, former Major League Baseball player
- Brenna Thummler, graphic novelist
- Vicki Van Meter, record-setting child pilot
- John K. Williams, Wisconsin state legislator
- Andrew J. Yorty, Wisconsin state legislator

== See also ==
- Meadville Medical Center Foundation
