= U.S. Route 67 in Iowa =

Highway in Iowa

U.S. Highway 67
- US 67 highlighted in red

Route information
- Maintained by Iowa DOT
- Length: 55.275 mi (88.956 km)
- Existed: Late 1934–present
- Tourist routes: Great River Road

Major junctions
- South end: US 67 at Davenport
- I-74 / US 6 at Bettendorf; I-80 at Le Claire; US 30 at Clinton
- North end: US 52 / Iowa 64 near Sabula

Location
- Country: United States
- State: Iowa
- Counties: Scott; Clinton; Jackson

Highway system
- United States Numbered Highway System; List; Special; Divided; Iowa Primary Highway System; Interstate; US; State; Secondary; Scenic
← US 65	→ US 69

U.S. Highway 67 (US 67) is a U.S. Highway in extreme eastern Iowa. The route begins in Davenport at the Rock Island Centennial Bridge where it crosses the Mississippi River and ends at an intersection with US 52 and Iowa Highway 64 (Iowa 64) west of Sabula. It passes through Bettendorf, Le Claire, and Clinton. Except for Folletts, every community which US 67 enters sits along the Mississippi River. As such, most of the route is part of the Great River Road, an All-American Road.

US 67 was created in late 1934, when it replaced US 55 from Davenport to Dubuque. The route ended then at the foot of the Julien Dubuque Bridge, which carries US 20. The northern half of the route, from Sabula to Dubuque, was overlapped by US 52 until 1967. Most of the state highways that intersect US 67 do so within sight of their Mississippi River bridge crossing.

== Route description ==
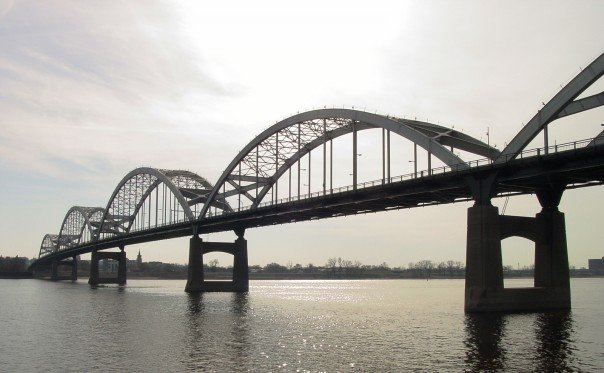
US 67 enters Iowa over the Centennial Bridge

US 67 crosses the Mississippi River into Davenport on the Rock Island Centennial Bridge. Adjacent to the bridge is Modern Woodmen Park, home of the Midwest League's Quad City River Bandits. Vehicles can continue to the north on Gaines Street, but US 67 traffic is forced to make a U-turn to the south to connect to River Drive. Prior to 2010, River Drive carried U.S. Route 61 (US 61), but the street now carries its business route. River Drive is prone to seasonal flooding from the Mississippi, as was the case in 1993, 1997, 2001, 2008, and 2011.

In downtown Davenport, US 61 Business intersects US 67 at two one-way streets, Harrison Street southbound and Brady Street northbound. Continuing east along the river, River Drive passes under the Government Bridge. It enters Bettendorf and becomes two one-way streets, Grant Street southbound and State Street northbound. The two streets intersect Interstate 74 (I-74) and US 6 at the foot of the I-74 Bridges near downtown Bettendorf.

Through Bettendorf and Riverdale, where the route turns to the northeast, US 67 is separated from the Mississippi riverfront by industry. Alcoa, which employs over 2000 workers at its Davenport works, is the largest plant along US 67.

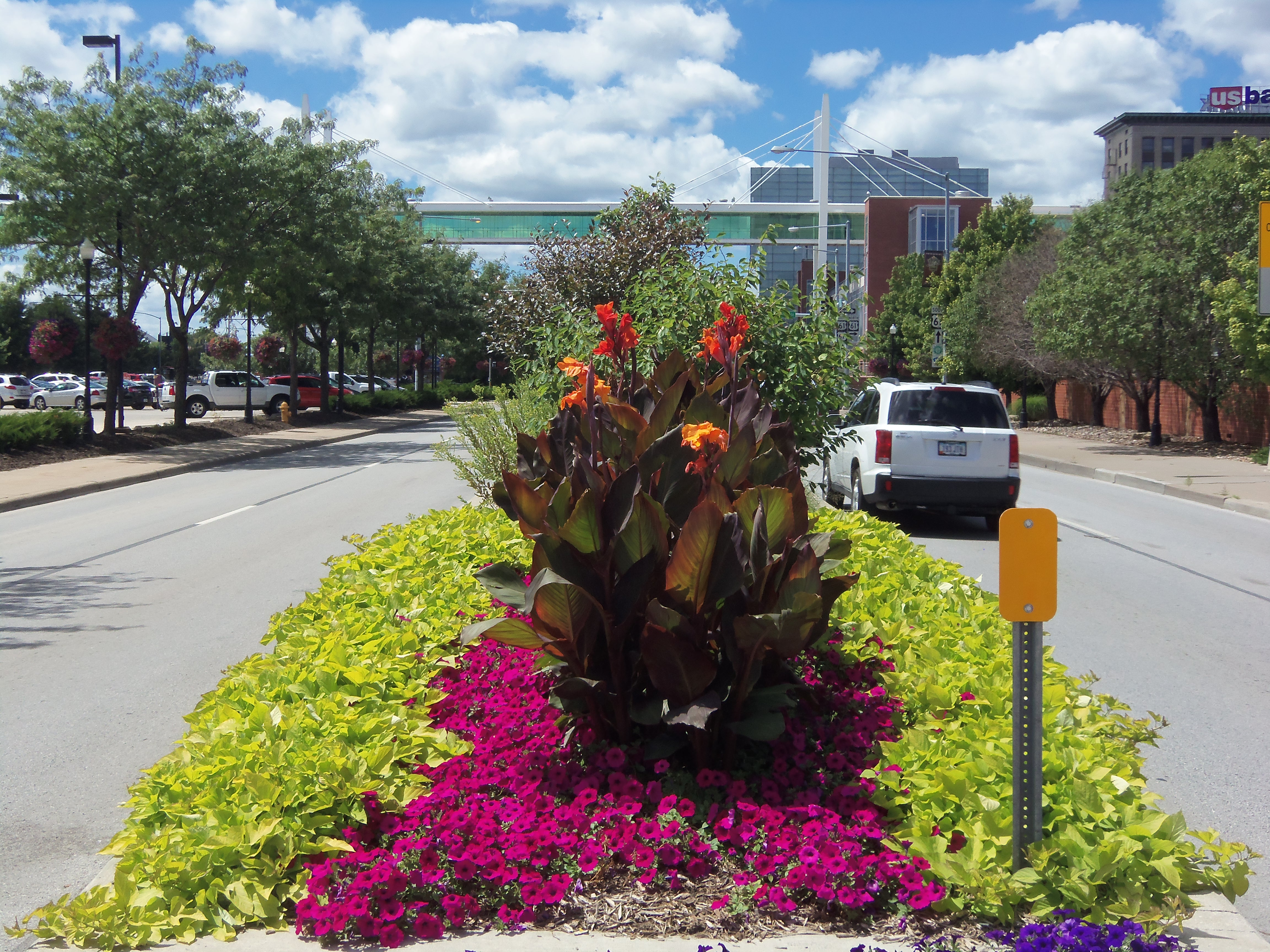
US 67 follows River Drive in Downtown Davenport

Just south of Le Claire is the I-80 interchange, where US 67 passes underneath the Fred Schwengel Memorial Bridge. In Le Claire the Mississippi River bends sharply and the highway follows. It heads through the picturesque downtown area, where many shops and even the street on which US 67 uses, Cody Road, pay homage to the Le Claire area's most famous son, Buffalo Bill Cody.

Between Le Claire and Princeton, US 67 continues to closely parallel the river. This stretch of the road allows for good opportunities for bird watching. Where there are open views of the river, you can see water fowl on the water amongst lily pads. This area is near the southern end of the Upper Mississippi River National Wildlife and Fish Refuge.

North of Princeton, US 67 turns inland to cross the Wapsipinicon River into Clinton County. At Folletts, the road takes a 90-degree turn back to the east towards Camanche. It then runs parallel to the river, which is obscured by trees surrounding its backwaters. At Camanche, it passes around the city to the west and north. At Washington Boulevard, which is the former alignment of the route through Camanche, it turns to the north onto a four-lane, undivided highway, which passes an industrial area and over Union Pacific's Overland Route. As it enters Clinton, it joins with US 30.

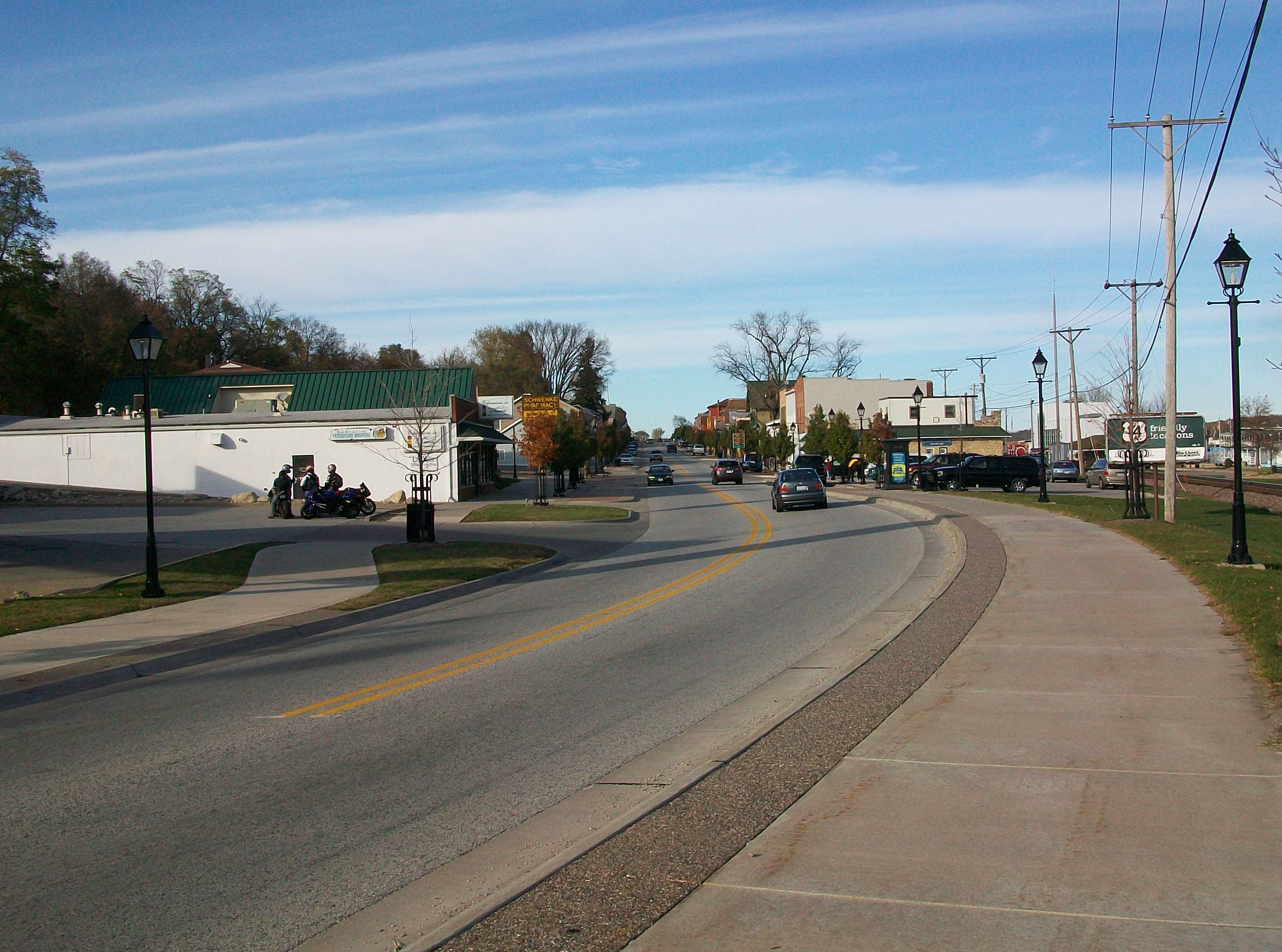
US 67 follows a bend in the Mississippi River north in Le Claire

US 30 / US 67 head east along Lincoln Way through an industrial and retail area. As they continue east, the two routes split into one-way streets, northbound Liberty Avenue and southbound Camanche Avenue. The one-way street alignment ends at 11th Avenue South, but quickly begins again as US 30 / US 67 turn to the north onto northbound South Third Street and southbound South 4th Street. At 8th Avenue South, US 30 splits away from US 67 and onto the Gateway Bridge and crosses into Illinois.

A block north, the one-way couplets rejoin and head a block east to South 2nd Street. US 67 stays on 2nd Street for the next two miles (3.2 km). It passes through the heart of downtown Clinton, past the historic Van Allen Building designed by Louis Sullivan, NelsonCorp Field, home of the Clinton LumberKings, also of the Midwest League, and passes the location of the failed Flav's Fried Chicken restaurant. On the northern end of Clinton, US 67 intercepts Iowa 136 at the foot of the Mark Morris Memorial Bridge to Fulton, Illinois. The two routes are overlapped for three-quarters mile (1.2 km) on 2nd Street and on Main Avenue. US 67 turns off of Main Avenue, away from Iowa 136 onto North 3rd Street and continues north out of town.

North of Clinton, US 67 travels through rural areas for the remainder of its route. Surrounded by acres (hectares) of farmland, houses occasionally dot the route. Near the Clinton–Jackson county line, the terrain begins to get hillier. The highway is entering the extreme southern end of the Driftless Area, a region of the Midwest that avoided glaciation during the last Ice Age. West of Sabula, US 67 meets Iowa 64. The US Highway merges onto the state highway, and the two routes head east together for two-fifths mile (640 m) until they meet US 52. Iowa 64 continues eastward with US 52, but US 67 ends its journey from Texas here.

== History ==
U.S. Highway 67 was extended into Iowa in late 1934, when it replaced the southernmost portion of US 55. It crossed the Mississippi River over the Government Bridge with US 32 (now US 6). The highway followed roughly the same route it does today through the then-Tri Cities, along the river to Clinton to its present end near Sabula. Instead of ending at US 52, the two routes continued north together along the river through Bellevue. Near Dubuque, the two highways converged with two others: US 61 and US 151. Closer to downtown Dubuque, US 67 ended where US 61 and US 151 diverged from US 52.

In 1940, US 67's entrance into Iowa was moved onto the new Rock Island Centennial Bridge. The Centennial Bridge was a toll bridge from its opening on July 12, 1940, until May 3, 2003. Tolls were originally 10 cents (equivalent to $2.30 in 2025) for drivers and 5 cents ($1.15 in 2025) for pedestrians. The pedestrian toll was ended in 1960. Driver tolls were 50 cents ($0.88 in 2025) when they were removed in 2003.

When the Julien Dubuque Bridge was completed in 1943, US 67's northern end was moved to the intersection of Dodge Street, which carried US 20, and Locust Street, which carried US 67, US 52, US 61, and US 151. Iowa 3's eastern end was moved to the same intersection, but on the opposite side of the street from US 67's end. The intersection of Dodge and Locust was located at the foot of the Julien Dubuque Bridge.

When it was designated US 67, only the first 45 miles (72 km), from Davenport to Almont, a ghost town in eastern Clinton County, were paved. Within ten years, paving had extended north to Iowa 64. In addition, a short section north of Bellevue had been paved. By 1955, all 95 miles (153 km) were paved. In 1967, US 67 was truncated at the intersection of US 52 and Iowa 64.

== Major intersections ==
County	Location	mi	km	Destinations	Notes
Mississippi River		0.000	0.000	US 67 south – Rock Island	Continuation into Illinois
Mississippi River		0.000	0.000	Rock Island Centennial Bridge	
Scott	Davenport	0.598	0.962	US 61 Bus. south (River Drive) / Great River Road	Southern end of US 61 Business and Great River Road overlap
Scott	Davenport	0.833	1.341	US 61 Bus. south (Harrison Street)	One-way street
Scott	Davenport	0.987	1.588	US 61 Bus. north (Brady Street)	One-way street; northern end of US 61 Business overlap
Scott	Bettendorf	4.431	7.131	I-74 / US 6	Passes beneath approaches to I-74 Bridge
Scott	Le Claire	13.500	21.726	I-80 – Des Moines, Chicago	Passes beneath approach to Fred Schwengel Memorial Bridge
Clinton	Camanche			Great River Road north (Washington Boulevard) – Camanche	Northern end of Great River Road overlap
Clinton	Camanche			Great River Road south (Washington Boulevard) – Camanche	Southern end of Great River Road overlap
Clinton	Clinton	34.427	55.405	US 30 west (Lincoln Way) / Lincoln Highway Heritage Byway – DeWitt	Southern end of US 30 and Lincoln Highway overlap
Clinton	Clinton	37.737	60.732	US 30 east (8th Avenue South) – Morrison	Northern end of US 30 overlap; intersection is at the foot of the Gateway Bridge
Clinton	Clinton			Great River Road north (6th Avenue South)	Northern end of Great River Road overlap
Clinton	Clinton			Great River Road south (9th Avenue North)	Southern end of Great River Road overlap
Clinton	Clinton	39.865	64.156	Iowa 136 south (19th Avenue North) / Lincoln Highway Heritage Byway – Fulton	Southern end of Iowa 136 overlap; northern end of Lincoln Highway overlap; intersection is near the foot of the Mark Morris Memorial Bridge
Clinton	Clinton	40.524	65.217	Iowa 136 north (Main Avenue)	Northern end of Iowa 136 overlap
Jackson	Union Township	54.808	88.205	Iowa 64 west – Miles, Maquoketa	Southern end of Iowa 64 overlap
Jackson	Union Township	55.275	88.956	US 52 / Iowa 64 east / Great River Road north – Sabula, Savanna, Bellevue	Northern end of Iowa 64 and Great River Road overlap; national end of US 67
1.000 mi = 1.609 km; 1.000 km = 0.621 mi: Concurrency terminus

U.S. Route 67
Previous state: Illinois	Iowa	Next state: Terminus
