= Interstate 74 in Iowa =

Highway in Iowa

Interstate 74
- I-74 highlighted in red

Route information
- Maintained by Iowa DOT
- Length: 5.36 mi (8.63 km)
- Existed: August 30, 1968–present
- History: Completed in 1974
- NHS: Entire route

Major junctions
- West end: I-80 in Davenport
- US 6 in Davenport; US 67 in Bettendorf
- East end: I-74 / US 6 in Moline, IL

Location
- Country: United States
- State: Iowa
- Counties: Scott

Highway system
- Interstate Highway System; Main; Auxiliary; Suffixed; Business; Future; Iowa Primary Highway System; Interstate; US; State; Secondary; Scenic
← US 71	→ US 75

Interstate 74 (I-74) is the central freeway through the Iowa Quad Cities. It roughly divides Davenport to the west and Bettendorf to the east. The Interstate Highway begins at an interchange with I-80 at the northeastern edge of Davenport and continues into Illinois at the Mississippi River by crossing the I-74 Bridge. The freeway was built in stages during the late 1960s and early 1970s.

The northern half of the Interstate was built atop farmland in northeastern Davenport, while the southern half was built near the existing U.S. Highway 6 (US 6) corridor through Bettendorf. After the approaches to the I-74 Bridge were rebuilt for Interstate traffic, it was completed and opened to traffic on November 26, 1974.

Between 2017 and 2021, the Iowa Department of Transportation (Iowa DOT) and the Illinois Department of Transportation (IDOT) reconstructed I-74 adjacent to the Mississippi River. The seven-mile-long (11 km) corridor was widened from four lanes to six, and the I-74 Bridge was also re-built.

== Route description ==
I-74 begins at a trumpet interchange with I-80 on the northern edge of Davenport where it heads to the south. From I-80 to the East 67th Street overpass, the freeway is surrounded by farmland on either side. South of the overpass, it passes a residential area to the east and a commercial area to the west. The East 53rd Street exit provides access to shopping centers on both sides of the Interstate.

Continuing south between East 53rd Street and Spruce Hills Drive, I-74 goes through an area of sparse development. What businesses there are, have frontages on either Elmore Avenue to the west or Utica Ridge Road to the east; the backs of these businesses abut the freeway. At the Spruce Hills Drive exit, US 6 joins from the west. Nearly 0.33 miles (0.53 km) to the west, Spruce Hills Drive becomes Kimberly Road, which carries US 6 through Davenport until it intersects I-280 on the western edge of the Quad Cities.

South of Spruce Hills Drive, I-74 runs parallel to the eastern leg of Kimberly Road, which turns south at its intersection with Spruce Hills Drive. The freeway curves slightly to the southeast and enters Bettendorf. It crosses Duck Creek and meets Middle Road at a diamond interchange.

As I-74 and US 6 head down a hill toward the Mississippi River, a series of exit and entrance ramps connect the freeway to US 67, which runs northbound along State Street and southbound along Grant Street. The Interstate passes over US 67 and railroad tracks belonging to the Dakota, Minnesota and Eastern Railroad on an elevated highway, which serves as the approach to the I-74 Bridge over the Mississippi River. Despite the singular name, the crossing is two twin bridges which each carry one direction of traffic to and from Moline, Illinois.

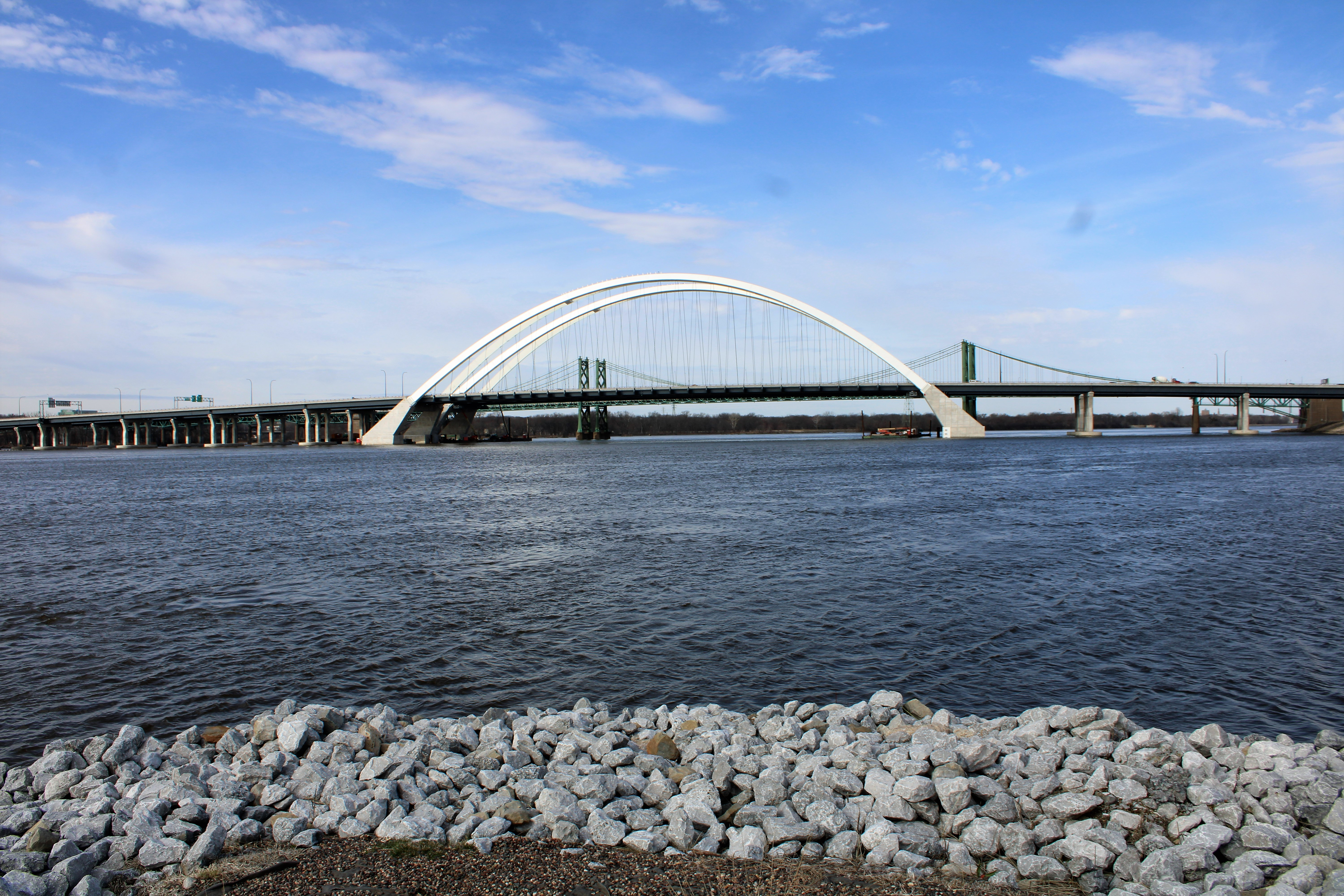
I-74 crosses the Mississippi River via the twin spans of the I-74 Bridge.

== History ==
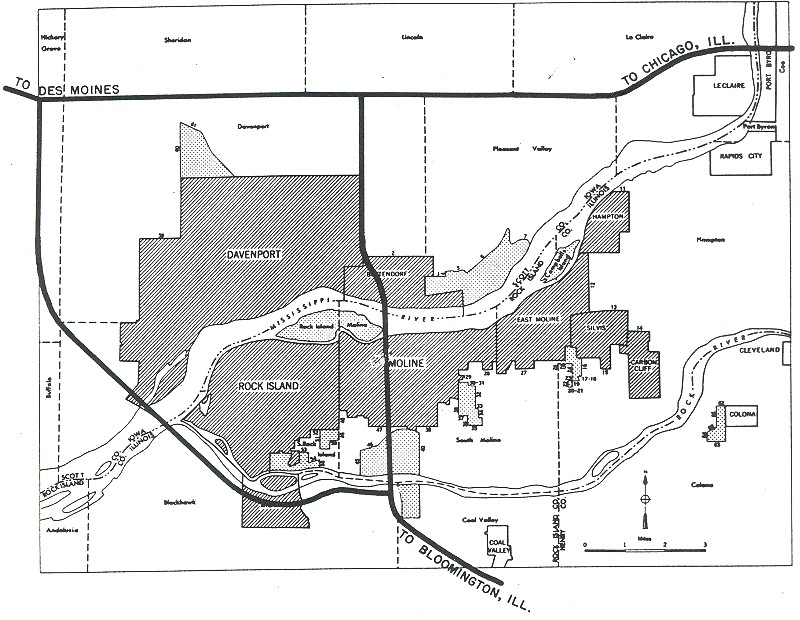
An Interstate bisecting the Quad Cities was planned as early as 1955

I-74 was part of the original plans for building Iowa's Interstate system. It would form the Iowa leg of a planned freeway from the Quad Cities to Cincinnati, Ohio. Its route through the Quad Cities closely resembles the path drawn up in the mid-1950s.

In the Iowa Quad Cities, I-74 opened in three segments beginning on August 30, 1968. On that day, the northernmost three miles (4.8 km), from I-80 to US 6, opened to traffic. The new freeway was built atop farmland west of Utica Ridge Road in the northeastern part of Davenport. The next section was built adjacent to the north–south portion of Kimberly Road, which then carried US 6 through Bettendorf. The segment ended where the Interstate lined up with the older street. The eastbound exit and westbound entrance ramps at Kimberly Road now provide access to and from US 67. The middle section opened in 1971.

Another three years passed before the freeway was completed and opened to traffic. The twin spans of the I-74 Bridge had to be retrofitted to connect to the Interstate. The Iowa-bound bridge was built as a Works Progress Administration project in 1934–1935 and the Illinois-bound bridge was 24 years later. Prior to Interstate construction, the I-74 Bridge terminated at State Street, the northbound lanes of US 67, in Bettendorf. To prevent traffic bottlenecks, traffic was prohibited from making left turns onto and off of the bridges. As a result, loop ramps diverted traffic onto Gilbert Street, one block south of State Street, which curved back to State Street at both ends thus allowing traffic to make the necessary left turns.

Construction of the Interstate meant eliminating the at-grade intersections with State and Grant streets. I-74 was built as the elevated highway from the bridges to a new overpass at Kimberly Road. The connections were completed and opened to traffic on November 26, 1974, and dedicated to Moline on December 11, 1975. In the late 1980s, a project was undertaken to widen 53rd Street to four lanes across northern Davenport. It included replacing an overpass of I-74 with an interchange.

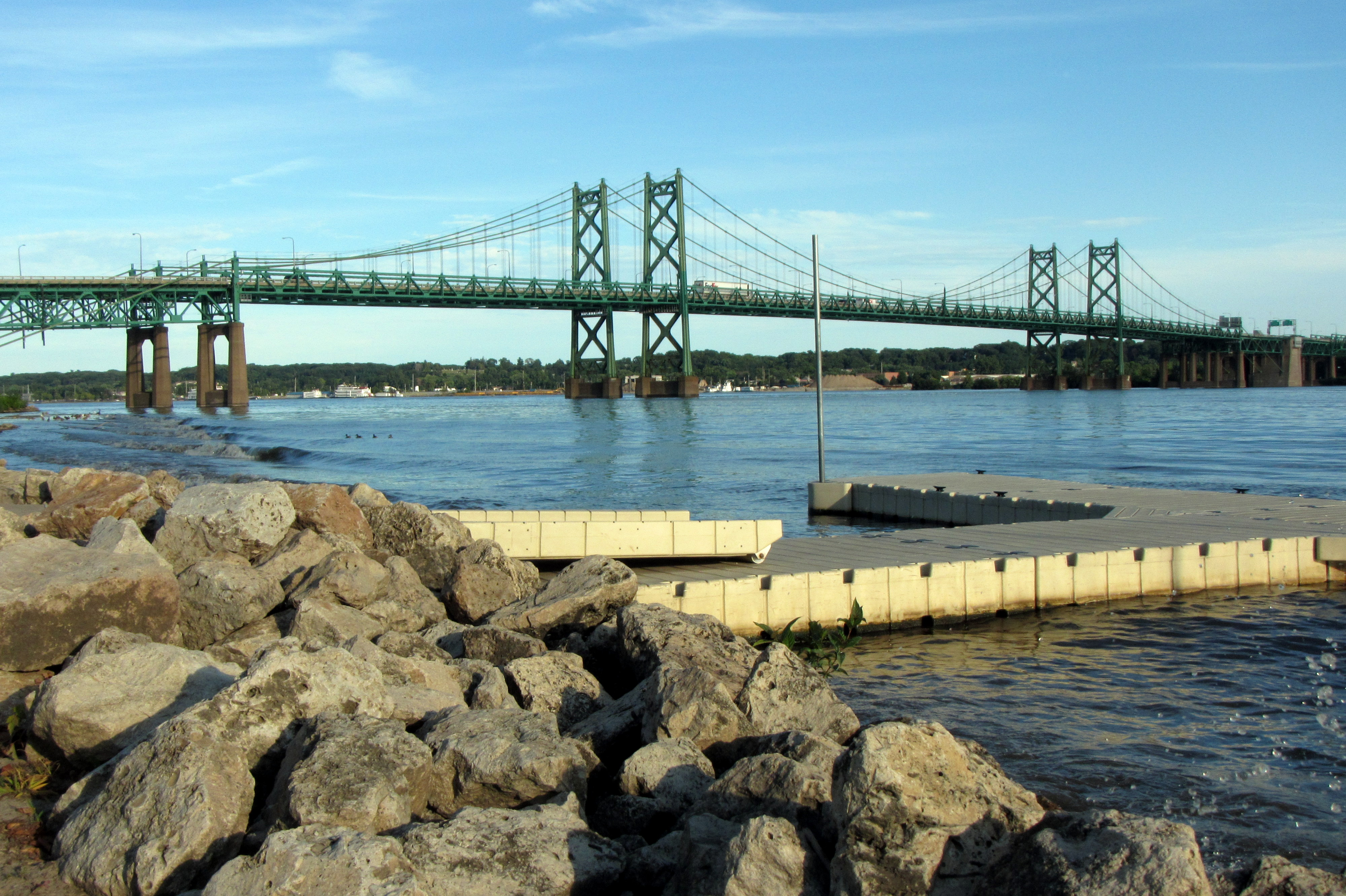
The old I-74 bridge spans

In 2005, Iowa DOT and IDOT began planning a new bridge to replace the aging I-74 Bridge. The Iowa-bound bridge opened in 1935; and the Illinois bridge in 1958. In addition to replacing the bridges, the scope of the bi-state coalition's plan includes updating seven miles (11 km) of I-74 mainline and interchanges from 53rd Street in Davenport to the Avenue of the Cities in Moline. They identified the traffic needs of the corridor and found they would be satisfied by a true-arch, tied-arch, or cable-stayed bridge. After public input and consideration of construction costs and aesthetics, the Departments of Transportation, in August 2006, recommended building two twin, true-arch, basket-handle bridges. US Senator Mark Kirk of Illinois suggested charging a toll upon motorists who use the new bridges to help pay for their construction. However, a 1998 study, which researched all river crossing options to replace the bridges, deemed new tolls were not viable.

In addition to the new river crossing, the mainline of I-74 between 53rd Street in Davenport and the Avenue of the Cities in Moline was widened from a four-lane freeway to six lanes; additional lanes will be picked up and dropped in selected locations. The new bridge itself is eight lanes; three through lanes and one auxiliary lane that enter on one side of the river and exit on the other. In downtown Bettendorf, the connection to US 67 was simplified. Previously, State and Grant streets were a one-way couplet through Bettendorf and a network of ramps and city streets formed the interchange. At the new I-74 interchange, State Street was rerouted to briefly join Grant Street so only four ramps were needed to make full connections between I-74 and US 67.

Construction along the corridor has already been completed at the 53rd Street interchange. A partial cloverleaf interchange was added in each direction to allow traffic to enter I-74 without making left turns at its intersection with 53rd Street. This phase of construction ended around December 2012. Officials from Iowa and Illinois, including Iowa Governor Kim Reynolds and Illinois Governor Bruce Rauner, were scheduled to be on hand to break ground on the new bridge on June 26, 2017. On either side of the arch, a 200-foot-tall (61 m) tower was built to hold the arch into place before the keystone segment was installed. The Iowa-bound keystone was installed on May 5, 2020, after which 108 hangers that support the road deck were strung from the arch. At 72 feet (22 m) wide, the westbound span is wider than both of the older bridges combined. It opened to traffic on November 20, 2020; both directions of I-74 traffic were placed onto the new bridge. Construction on the Illinois-bound arch began shortly after. The eastbound keystone was installed on May 5, 2021.

== Exit list ==
The entire route is in Scott County.

Location	mi	km	Exit	Destinations	Notes
Davenport	0.000– 0.316	0.000– 0.509	—	I-80 – Des Moines, Chicago	Western end of I-74; I-80 exit 298
Davenport	1.527	2.457	1	53rd Street – Hamilton Technical College	
Davenport	2.896	4.661	2	US 6 west (Spruce Hills Drive, Kimberly Road)	Western end of US 6 overlap
Bettendorf	3.902	6.280	3	Middle Road, Locust Street	
Bettendorf	4.944	7.957	4	US 67 (Grant Street, State Street) – Riverfront	
Mississippi River	5.399	8.689	I-74 Bridge; Iowa–Illinois state line		
Mississippi River	5.399	8.689		I-74 east / US 6 east – Peoria	Continuation into Illinois
1.000 mi = 1.609 km; 1.000 km = 0.621 mi: Concurrency terminus

Interstate 74
Previous state: Terminus	Iowa	Next state: Illinois
