= LeBoeuf Township, Pennsylvania =

Township in Pennsylvania, US

Coordinates: 41°51′00″N 79°56′59″W

LeBoeuf Township
- Township
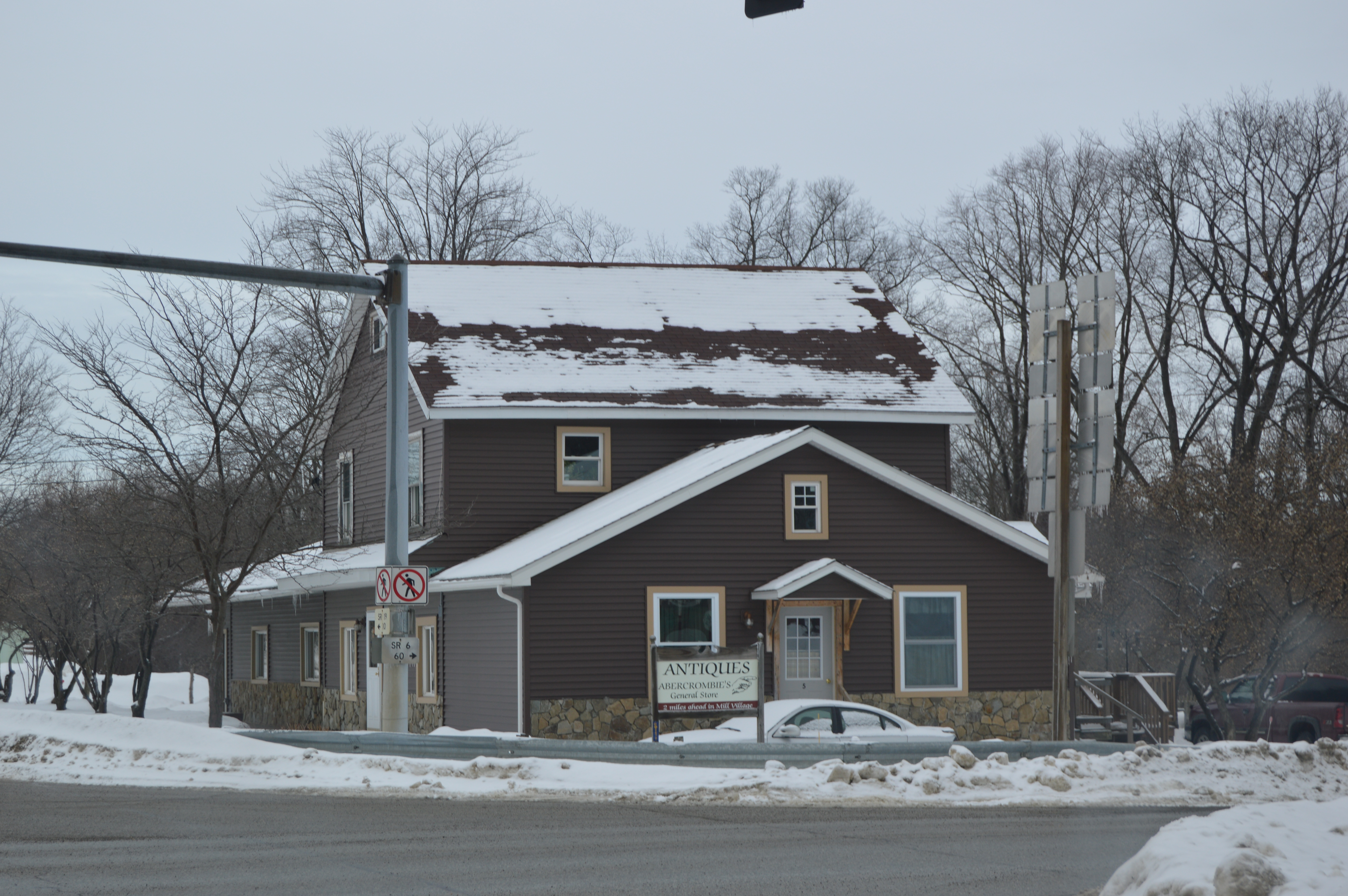
- Restaurant at the crossroads of U.S. Routes 6/19

- Location in Erie County and the U.S. state of Pennsylvania
- Country: United States
- State: Pennsylvania
- County: Erie

Area
  - Total: 33.88 sq mi (87.75 km^{2})
  - Land: 33.47 sq mi (86.68 km^{2})
  - Water: 0.41 sq mi (1.07 km^{2})
- Highest elevation (southeast corner): 1,698 ft (518 m)
- Lowest elevation (French Creek): 1,145 ft (349 m)

Population (2020)
  - Total: 1,658
  - Estimate (2023): 1,639
  - Density: 49.4/sq mi (19.09/km^{2})
- Time zone: UTC-4 (EST)
  - Summer (DST): UTC-5 (EDT)
- Area code: 814
- FIPS code: 42-049-42208
- Website: https://leboeuftwp.com/

LeBoeuf Township is a township in Erie County, Pennsylvania, United States. The population was 1,658 at the 2020 census, down from 1,698 at the 2010 census.

The township took its name from LeBoeuf Creek.

== Geography ==
The township is located along the southern edge of Erie County and is bordered to the south by Crawford County. The township surrounds the borough of Mill Village, a separate municipality. According to the United States Census Bureau, the township has a total area of 33.9 square miles (87.8 km^{2}), of which 33.5 square miles (86.7 km^{2}) is land and 0.42 square miles (1.1 km^{2}), or 1.22%, is water. French Creek, a tributary of the Allegheny River, crosses the township from the northeastern corner to the south. LeBoeuf Creek joins French Creek from the north in the northwest part of the township.

== Demographics ==
Historical population
Census	Pop.	Note	%±
2000	1,680		—
2010	1,698		1.1%
2020	1,658		−2.4%
2023 (est.)	1,639		−1.1%
U.S. Decennial Census

As of the census of 2000, there were 1,680 people, 567 households, and 460 families residing in the township. The population density was 49.8 inhabitants per square mile (19.2/km^{2}). There were 630 housing units at an average density of 18.7/sq mi (7.2/km^{2}). The racial makeup of the township was 98.27% White, 0.95% African American, 0.12% Native American, 0.12% Asian, 0.06% from other races, and 0.48% from two or more races. Hispanic or Latino of any race were 0.48% of the population.

There were 567 households, of which 42.7% had children under the age of 18 living with them, 68.6% were married couples living together, 7.1% had a female householder with no husband present, and 18.7% were non-families. 14.1% of all households were made up of individuals, and 5.3% had someone living alone who was 65 years of age or older. The average household size was 2.96 and the average family size was 3.25.

In the township the population was spread out, with 30.4% under the age of 18, 7.6% from 18 to 24, 30.7% from 25 to 44, 23.8% from 45 to 64, and 7.4% who were 65 years of age or older. The median age was 34 years. For every 100 females there were 103.9 males. For every 100 females age 18 and over, there were 99.5 males.

The median income for a household in the township was $42,250, and the median income for a family was $47,986. Males had a median income of $34,115 versus $23,125 for females. The per capita income for the township was $16,522. About 4.3% of families and 7.0% of the population were below the poverty line, including 8.5% of those under age 18 and 4.5% of those age 65 or over.
