= Lorah, Iowa =

- Unincorporated community
- Location within Iowa
- Coordinates: 41°28′13″N 94°57′19″W
- Country: United States
- State: Iowa
- County: Cass
- Elevation: 1,224 ft (373 m)
- Time zone: UTC-6 (Central (CST))
  - Summer (DST): UTC-5 (CDT)
- Area code: 712
- GNIS feature ID: 464628

Lorah is an unincorporated community in Pymosa Township, Cass County, Iowa, United States. Lorah is located along U.S. routes 6 and 71, 5.5 miles (8.9 km) north-northeast of Atlantic.

== History ==
Lorah's population was 14 in 1902, and 50 in 1925. The population was 36 in 1940.

A post office operated in Lorah from 1880 to 1936.
