= Memphis, Florida =

- Census-designated place
- Location in Manatee County and the state of Florida
- Coordinates: 27°32′37″N 82°33′39″W
- Country: United States
- State: Florida
- County: Manatee

Area
  - Total: 3.68 sq mi (9.52 km^{2})
  - Land: 3.26 sq mi (8.44 km^{2})
  - Water: 0.42 sq mi (1.08 km^{2})
- Elevation: 13 ft (4.0 m)

Population (2020)
  - Total: 9,024
  - Density: 2,768.4/sq mi (1,068.88/km^{2})
- Time zone: UTC-5 (Eastern (EST))
  - Summer (DST): UTC-4 (EDT)
- ZIP Code: 34221 (Palmetto)
- Area code: 941
- FIPS code: 12-44175
- GNIS feature ID: 2403276

Memphis is an unincorporated community and census-designated place (CDP) in Manatee County, Florida, United States. The population was 9,024 as of the 2020 census, up from 7,848 in 2010. It is part of the North Port–Bradenton–Sarasota, Florida Metropolitan Statistical Area.

== History ==
The community can trace its roots back to the 1880s, when it was planned as an 80-acre subdivision, adjacent to the city of Palmetto. Tennessee-born Robert Willis (1855-1933) originally owned the land, but eventually it was sold to I.E. Barwick (1854-1924) who subdivided it. The community's traditional borders roughly lie on the west side of 16th Avenue East and just on the west side of U.S. 41, and between 17th and 25th Streets East. An 1897 Manatee County directory mentions a handful of establishments, from a clothing store to a crate mill and a bakery then under construction.

Over time, the area eventually became a predominantly African American community in the segregation era. The Old Memphis cemetery is the resting place of over 600 individuals. Many of the graves are of these early African American settlers, some of whom were freed slaves. The cemetery lies north of the community and was closed by the 1970s. Early residents included the Reverend Daniel and Isabel Baity. Reverend Baity became the first minister of the first African American church in Sarasota. The identity of the close-knit community was interrupted with the construction of U.S. 41 in the 1960s. In more recent years, the old cemetery fell into disrepair and was cleaned up on several occasions. An historical marker was erected in 2013 at the entrance of the Old Memphis cemetery.

== Geography ==
Memphis is located in northern Manatee County. It is bordered to the south and west by the city of Palmetto and to the northwest by Terra Ceia Bay, an arm of Tampa Bay.

According to the United States Census Bureau, the CDP has a total area of 3.7 square miles (9.6 km^{2}), of which 3.3 square miles (8.5 km^{2}) are land and 0.4 square miles (1.0 km^{2}), or 11.29%, are water. The main road through the community is US Route 41, also known as the Tamiami Trail, which leads south 4 miles (6 km) to Bradenton, the county seat, and north 38 miles (61 km) to Tampa. US Route 19 has its southern terminus at US 41 in Memphis. US 19 leads northwest via the Sunshine Skyway Bridge over Tampa Bay to St. Petersburg, 21 miles (34 km) away.

== Demographics ==
Historical population
Census	Pop.	Note	%±
1960	2,647		—
1970	3,207		21.2%
1980	5,501		71.5%
1990	6,760		22.9%
2000	7,264		7.5%
2010	7,848		8.0%
2020	9,024		15.0%

=== 2020 census ===
As of the 2020 census, Memphis had a population of 9,024. The median age was 37.5 years. 25.8% of residents were under the age of 18 and 16.8% of residents were 65 years of age or older. For every 100 females there were 94.4 males, and for every 100 females age 18 and over there were 93.1 males age 18 and over.

100.0% of residents lived in urban areas, while 0.0% lived in rural areas.

There were 3,161 households in Memphis, of which 32.7% had children under the age of 18 living in them. Of all households, 44.0% were married-couple households, 18.2% were households with a male householder and no spouse or partner present, and 30.4% were households with a female householder and no spouse or partner present. About 23.3% of all households were made up of individuals and 10.5% had someone living alone who was 65 years of age or older.

There were 3,601 housing units, of which 12.2% were vacant. The homeowner vacancy rate was 1.9% and the rental vacancy rate was 9.2%.

Racial composition as of the 2020 census
Race	Number	Percent
White	3,815	42.3%
Black or African American	2,749	30.5%
American Indian and Alaska Native	72	0.8%
Asian	59	0.7%
Native Hawaiian and Other Pacific Islander	9	0.1%
Some other race	1,153	12.8%
Two or more races	1,167	12.9%
Hispanic or Latino (of any race)	2,902	32.2%

=== 2010 census ===
At the 2010 census there were 7,848 people, 2,501 households, and 1,835 families in the CDP. The population density was 2,297.1 inhabitants per square mile (886.9/km^{2}). There were 3,204 housing units at an average density of 895.6 per square mile (345.8/km^{2}). The racial makeup of the CDP was 44.74% White, 36.34% African American, 0.10% Native American, 0.30% Asian, 0.14% Pacific Islander, 7.81% from other races, and 1.56% from two or more races. Hispanic or Latino of any race were 28.5%.

Of the 2,501 households 33.2% had children under the age of 18 living with them, 47.5% were married couples living together, 19.9% had a female householder with no husband present, and 26.6% were non-families. 21.3% of households were one person and 9.4% were one person aged 65 or older. The average household size was 2.82 and the average family size was 3.26.

The age distribution was 29.3% under the age of 18, 9.7% from 18 to 24, 26.3% from 25 to 44, 20.9% from 45 to 64, and 13.8% 65 or older. The median age was 34 years. For every 100 females, there were 98.1 males. For every 100 females age 18 and over, there were 96.4 males.

The median household income was $32,576 and the median family income was $35,600. Males had a median income of $26,250 versus $21,979 for females. The per capita income for the CDP was $14,778. About 16.5% of families and 20.7% of the population were below the poverty line, including 27.5% of those under age 18 and 13.6% of those age 65 or over.
