= Mill Village, Pennsylvania =

Borough in Pennsylvania, US

- Borough
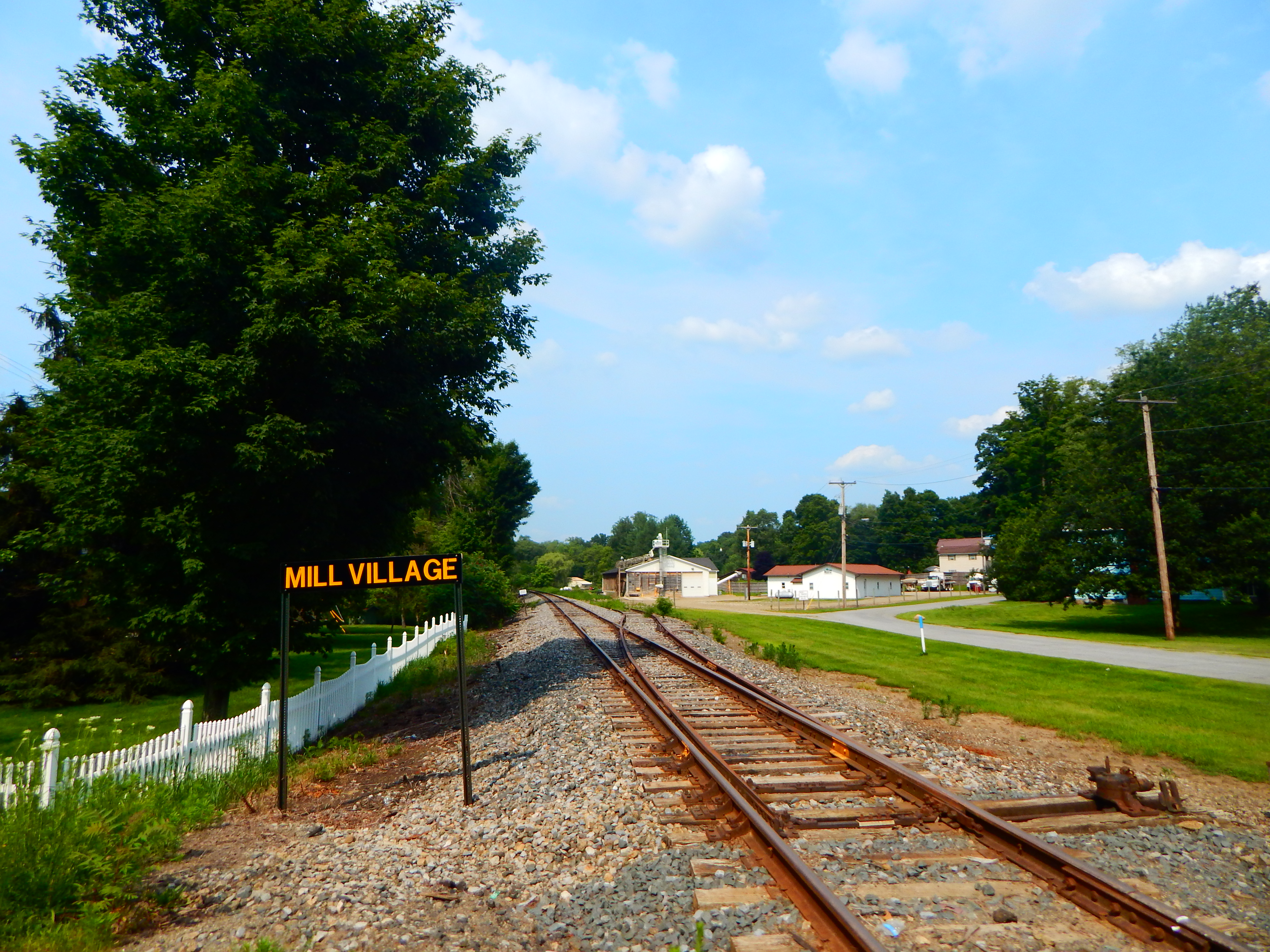
- Site of the Mill Village station along the Erie Railroad

- Location in Erie County and the U.S. state of Pennsylvania.
- Coordinates: 41°52′34″N 79°58′21″W
- Country: United States
- State: Pennsylvania
- County: Erie

Government
  - Mayor: Joseph Sam

Area
  - Total: 0.92 sq mi (2.38 km^{2})
  - Land: 0.92 sq mi (2.38 km^{2})
  - Water: 0 sq mi (0.00 km^{2})
- Elevation (Borough benchmark): 1,206 ft (368 m)
- Highest elevation (south borough boundary): 1,320 ft (400 m)
- Lowest elevation (Tributary to French Creek): 1,160 ft (350 m)

Population (2020)
  - Total: 388
  - Density: 422.4/sq mi (163.09/km^{2})
- Time zone: UTC-4 (EST)
  - Summer (DST): UTC-5 (EDT)
- ZIP code: 16427
- Area code: 814
- FIPS code: 42-49936
- Website: millvillageboro.org

Mill Village is a borough in Erie County, Pennsylvania, United States. The population was 394 at the 2020 census, down from 412 during the 2010 census. It is part of the Erie Metropolitan Statistical Area.

== Geography ==
Mill Village is located in southern Erie County at 41°52′34″N 79°58′21″W (41.876050, -79.972607). It is surrounded by LeBoeuf Township. U.S. Route 6 passes through the borough, leading east 7 miles (11 km) to Union City and southwest 8 miles (13 km) to Cambridge Springs. Erie is 19 miles (31 km) to the north.

According to the United States Census Bureau, Mill Village has a total area of 0.93 square miles (2.4 km^{2}), all land. It sits on the eastern edge of the valley of French Creek, part of the Allegheny River watershed.

== Demographics ==
Historical population
Census	Pop.	Note	%±
1880	388		—
1890	320		−17.5%
1900	321		0.3%
1910	290		−9.7%
1920	247		−14.8%
1930	233		−5.7%
1940	259		11.2%
1950	324		25.1%
1960	336		3.7%
1970	372		10.7%
1980	427		14.8%
1990	429		0.5%
2000	412		−4.0%
2010	412		0.0%
2020	388		−5.8%
2021 (est.)	390	▲	0.5%

As of the census of 2000, there were 412 people, 149 households, and 116 families residing in the borough. The population density was 452.6 inhabitants per square mile (174.7/km^{2}). There were 162 housing units at an average density of 177.9 per square mile (68.7/km^{2}). The racial makeup of the borough was 98.30% White, 0.24% African American, 0.97% from other races, and 0.49% from two or more races.

There were 149 households, out of which 38.3% had children under the age of 18 living with them, 66.4% were married couples living together, 5.4% had a female householder with no husband present, and 21.5% were non-families. 17.4% of all households were made up of individuals, and 8.7% had someone living alone who was 65 years of age or older. The average household size was 2.77 and the average family size was 3.11.

In the borough the population was spread out, with 29.9% under the age of 18, 6.8% from 18 to 24, 27.9% from 25 to 44, 23.5% from 45 to 64, and 11.9% who were 65 years of age or older. The median age was 37 years. For every 100 females there were 104.0 males. For every 100 females age 18 and over, there were 100.7 males.

The median income for a household in the borough was $34,375, and the median income for a family was $35,156. Males had a median income of $24,444 versus $20,625 for females. The per capita income for the borough was $12,529. About 7.2% of families and 9.4% of the population were below the poverty line, including 9.9% of those under age 18 and 12.2% of those age 65 or over.
