= Folletts, Iowa =

- unincorporated community
- Location within Iowa Location within the United States
- Country: United States
- State: Iowa
- County: Clinton County
- Time zone: UTC-6 (Central (CST))
  - Summer (DST): UTC-5 (CDT)
- Area code: 563

Folletts is an unincorporated community in Clinton County, Iowa, United States. It is located at the intersections of 292nd Street and County Highway Z36 on the north bank of the Wapsipinicon River. It is one mile west of Shaffton and three miles east of McCausland, at 41.750099N, -90.354990W.

== History ==
A ferry service was established by William Follett on the Wapsipinicon River in 1837. In 1884, the Folletts post office was established; it was discontinued in 1933. The population of Folletts was 48 in 1902, and 50 in 1925.

Until the Great Depression, Folletts was an important trade stop on the Chicago, Rock Island and Pacific Railroad.

The population was 59 in 1940.
