= Pymosa Township, Cass County, Iowa =

Township in Iowa, US

Pymosa Township, Cass County
- Township
- Coordinates: 41°27′42″N 094°59′14″W
- Country: United States
- State: Iowa
- County: Cass

Area
  - Total: 35.63 sq mi (92.29 km^{2})
  - Land: 35.63 sq mi (92.28 km^{2})
  - Water: 0.0039 sq mi (0.01 km^{2})
- Elevation: 1,289 ft (393 m)

Population (2000)
  - Total: 318
  - Density: 8.8/sq mi (3.4/km^{2})
- FIPS code: 19-93528
- GNIS feature ID: 0468584

Pymosa Township is one of sixteen townships in Cass County, Iowa, USA. As of the 2000 census, its population was 318.

== Geography ==
Pymosa Township covers an area of 35.63 square miles (92.3 km^{2}) and contains no incorporated settlements. According to the USGS, it contains one cemetery, Lorah.
