= I-74 Bridge =

Bridges across the Mississippi River between Iowa and Illinois

Interstate 74 Bridge
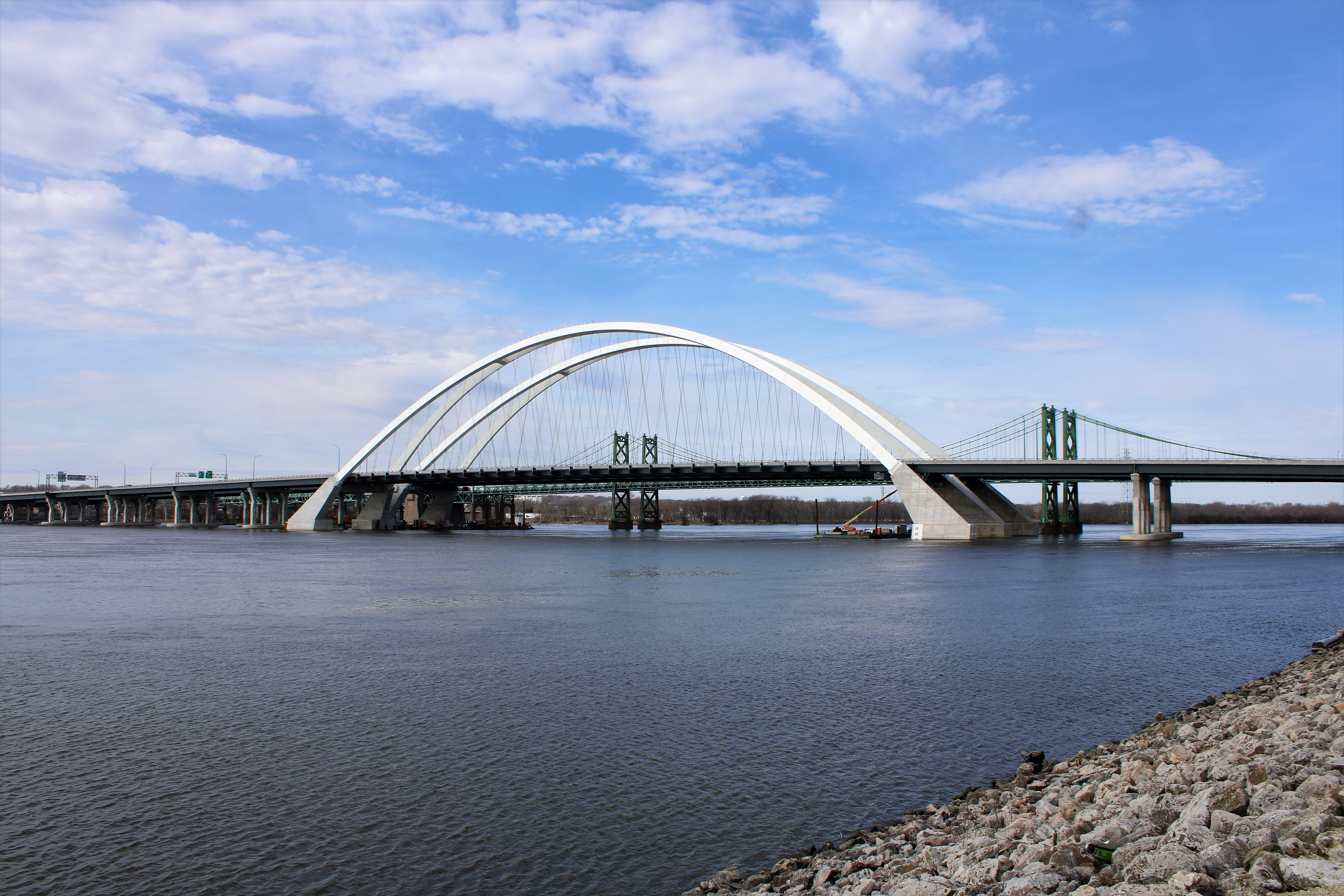
- New and old bridges in 2022.
- Coordinates: 41°31′01″N 90°30′38″W
- Carries: 8 lanes of I-74 / US 6
- Crosses: Mississippi River
- Locale: Bettendorf, Iowa, and Moline, Illinois
- Official name: Iowa-Illinois Memorial Bridge
- Maintained by: Iowa Department of Transportation

Characteristics
- Design: Twin basket-handle, through arch
- Longest span: 800 ft (244 m)

History
- Opened: November 13, 2020; 5 years ago (northbound); December 2, 2021; 4 years ago (southbound)

Statistics
- Daily traffic: 80,000

Location
- Interactive map of Interstate 74 Bridge

The Interstate 74 Bridge, officially known as the Iowa-Illinois Memorial Bridge, and often called The Twin Bridges, or the I-74 Bridge, are basket-handle, through arch twin bridges that carry Interstate 74 across the Mississippi River and connect Bettendorf, Iowa, and Moline, Illinois. It is located near the geographic center of the Quad Cities. The two bridges were completed in 2020 (Illinois to Iowa span) and 2021 (Iowa to Illinois), replacing two suspension bridges that had opened to traffic in 1935 and 1959; these had become obsolete by the 1990s.

== History ==
I-74 Bridge (original)
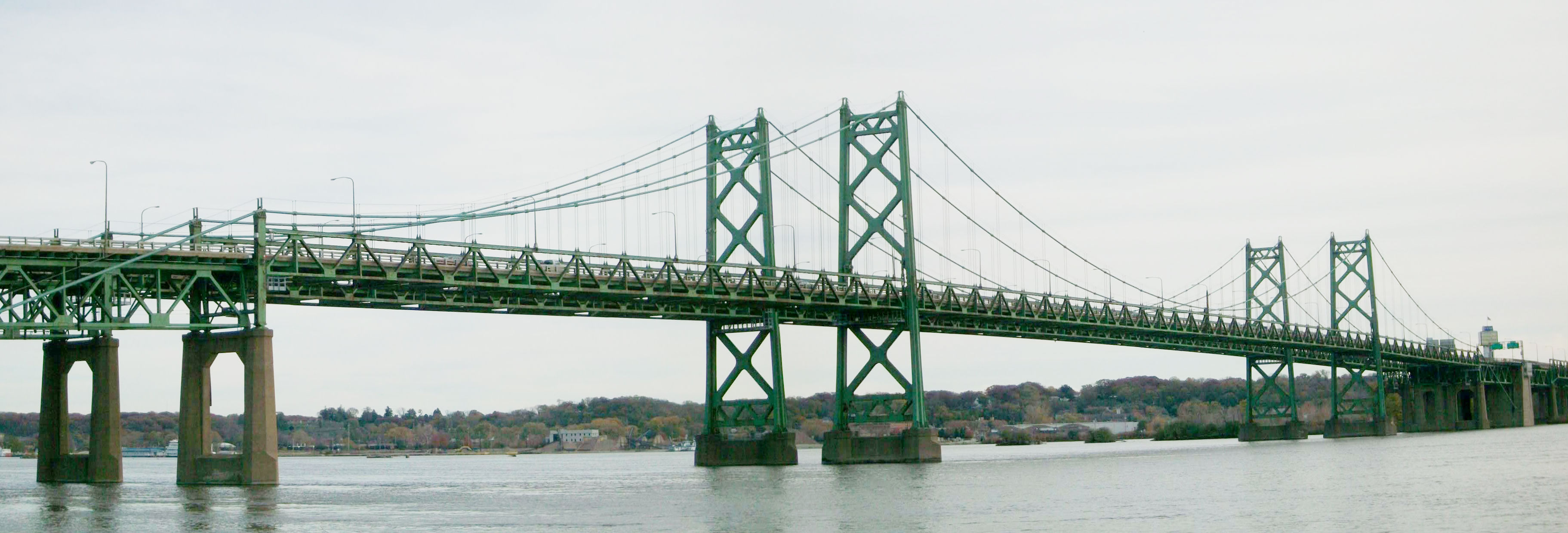
- The old bridges as seen from the Iowa side of the Mississippi River before any construction began.
- Coordinates: 41°31′12″N 90°30′48″W
- Carried: 4 lanes of I-74 / US 6
- Crossed: Mississippi River
- Locale: Bettendorf, Iowa and Moline, Illinois
- Official name: Iowa-Illinois Memorial Bridge
- Maintained by: Iowa Department of Transportation

Characteristics
- Design: Twin suspension bridges
- Total length: 3,372 feet (1,028 m)
- Width: 27 feet (8 m)
- Longest span: 227 metres (745 ft)
- Clearance below: Mississippi River

History
- Opened: November 18, 1935 (first span); December 22, 1959 (second span)
- Closed: November 13, 2020
- Demolished: 2017- mid 2024

Statistics
- Daily traffic: 80,000
- Toll: Former, abolished December 31, 1969

Location
- Interactive map of I-74 Bridge (original)

=== Original Span ===
Before the first span was built, the only bridge in the Tri Cities was the Government Bridge between Rock Island, Illinois, and Davenport, Iowa. William P. Bettendorf, founder of the Bettendorf Company and namesake for the city of Bettendorf, began planning a toll bridge between Bettendorf and Moline in 1907. The year before, the United States Congress passed a law allowing private citizens to build bridges as a business venture. In 1931, the city of Davenport and a group of local businessmen formed the Davenport Bridge Commission to construct a new bridge. Moline refused to grant the franchise for the bridge and the early years of the Great Depression made it difficult for the businessmen to finance it on their own without Moline's help. In 1927, the idea of this bridge was revived. After several setbacks due to design and location issues, Bonds were issued for the building of the new bridge in February 1934, with construction beginning on July 1. It was designed by engineer Ralph Modjeski, and opened on November 18. Tolling began the next day, set at 15 cents for passenger vehicles and light trucks, 30 cents for heavy trucks, and 5 cents for pedestrians.

=== Twinning ===
At the end of World War II, traffic increased substantially on the bridge, prompting studies for a possible widening of the crossing to four lanes. Modjeski and Masters were hired in 1951 to study the feasibility of constructing a second twin span. At the completion of these studies, it was determined a second twin span would be the best option. On July 16, 1952, a bill to construct this span was passed under the 82nd Congress, and President Harry S. Truman signed the bill into law. While construction was supposed to begin in 1956, bidding for a contractor did not start until May 6, 1958. Groundbreaking for the new span was on July 1, 1958. It was constructed as close as possible to the existing span to avoid demolishing more historic buildings than necessary. By February 1959, the suspender ropes had been completed, and construction of the superstructure commenced. The bridge was completed in November 1959, and put into service on December 22. Money from tolls paid for most of the new span. At this point, all traffic was routed onto the new span, and the original was temporarily closed for an extensive reconstruction. New loop ramps were constructed on the Bettendorf approach to allow for increased traffic to easily cross the bridge. In Moline, land was cleared for a new approach that carried traffic to 19th Street and 3rd Street, replacing the old approach which had only carried traffic to 20th Street and 3rd Street. Traffic patterns in that part of the city were altered to accommodate the increased flow. The upstream span, the older of the two, reopened to westbound traffic on July 1, 1960. The new span was dedicated on January 20, 1961. The original 1935 span's dedication plaque was relocated to share a pedestal with the new span's plaque. The second span was dedicated to Iowa and Illinois soldiers who died in both world wars, while the first had been dedicated to those from the Great War.

=== Upgrade to Interstate Standards ===
In 1965, the U.S Government made plans to purchase and use the bridge to route Interstate 74. The Davenport Bridge Commission hoped that the Federal Government would continue allowing tolls on the bridge, but it did not. A deal was struck stating that when enough toll money was collected, the bridge would be rehabilitated and reconstructed to Interstate standards. When this goal was met, the Federal Government bought the bridge on December 31, 1969, and work began on the project in November 1971, with the removal of the toll plazas. Next, work began to replace the guardrails, remove the sidewalks from the westbound span, and remove the toll plaza and toll offices. The existing approaches were demolished and replaced with new elevated ramps. The road capacity was temporarily restored to two lanes as reconstruction work required the closure of one span at a time. Completion of the project was delayed due to funding issues caused by the Vietnam War. The bridge was reopened on November 26, 1974, with I-74 rerouted on December 10, 1975, at which point the Iowa and Illinois Departments of Transportation took control of the bridge. Around this time, the original dedication plaque was relocated to sit next to the 1935 span, while a new pedestal memorialized veterans of the Korean and Vietnam Wars.

=== Issues and Replacement ===
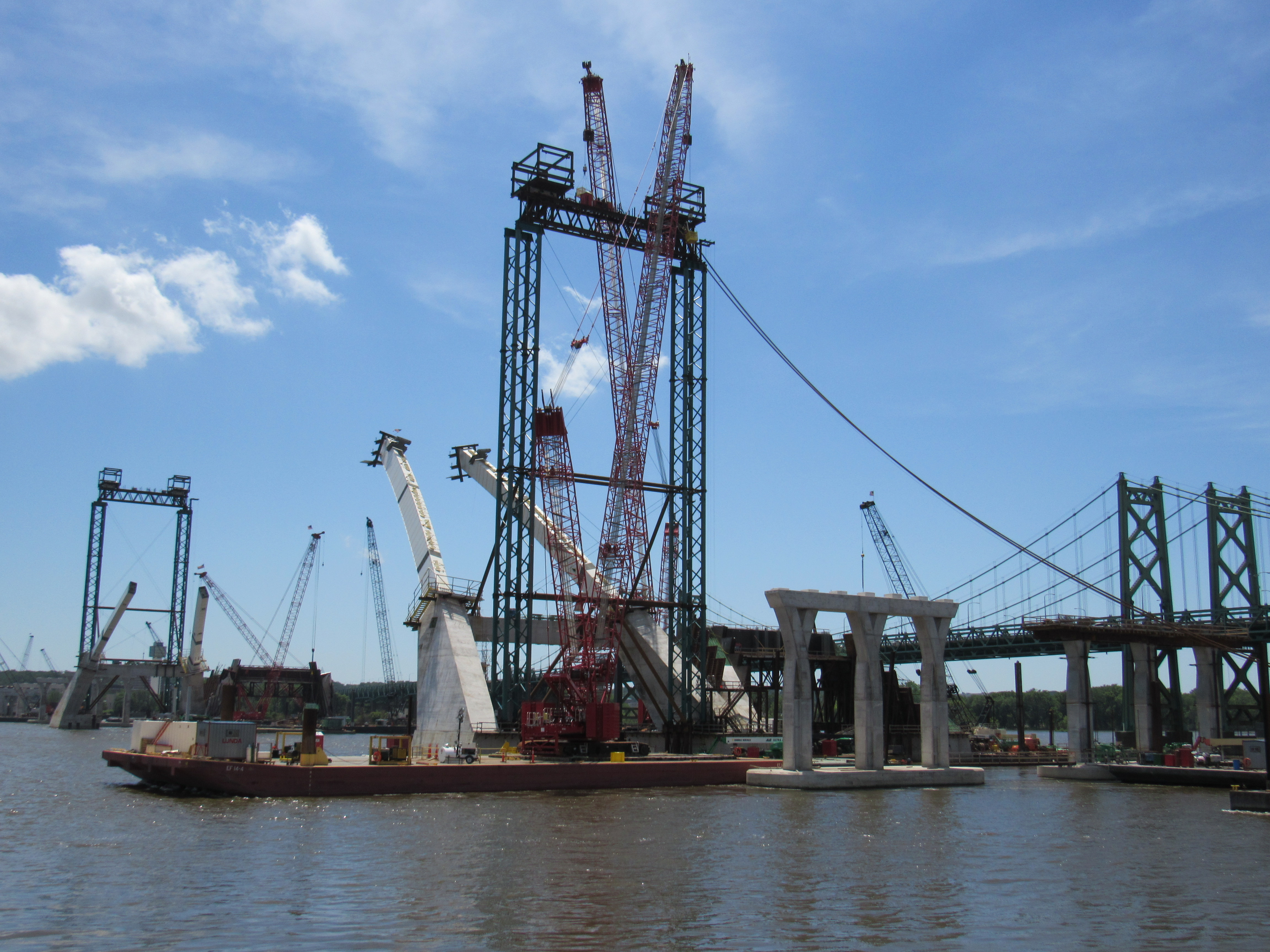
Construction of the new bridge in 2019.

Built for a daily crossing of 48,000 vehicles, in its later years the daily average grew to 80,000, making it by far the most traveled bridge in the Quad Cities. In 1994, the Illinois Department of Transportation requested a study of bridges from the Fred Schwengel Memorial Bridge to Sergeant John F. Baker Jr. Bridge in the Quad Cities and the Bi-State Regional Commission agreed. The I-80 and I-280 bridges were up to then-current Interstate standards, while the I-74 bridge was functionally obsolete, having predated I-74's routing through the area. Each span had two narrow lanes, no shoulder, and a 50-mile-per-hour (80 km/h) speed limit. By the 2010s, both spans had become structurally deficient, requiring constant maintenance to keep in service. While touring the base of the bridge in Bettendorf in May 2012, U.S. Transportation Secretary Ray LaHood said that, in comparison to other bridges that he had seen in other states, the I-74 Bridge was one of the worst. Because of this, The I-74 Corridor Study was initiated to study replacing the old spans with larger ones having four lanes each. The study found that such a project would spur economic growth, create construction jobs, reduce traffic backups, and improve air quality. $22 million was earmarked for construction of the new bridge in 2017, with an additional $50 million allocated in 2018. Former Illinois Governor Pat Quinn said the state was committed to bridge improvements to help traffic flow and "boost economic growth in the region". By 2012, the Illinois DOT had budgeted more than $34 million for engineering, design, and land acquisition for the new bridge. The conceptual design of the arch bridge was completed by CH2M Hill and Boston-based bridge designer Miguel Rosales from Rosales + Partners. Final design was completed by Modjeski and Masters in association with Alfred Benesch & Company. The portion of the bridge spanning the Mississippi River was estimated at more than $700 million, while the project as a whole, including all approach routes and connectors, was estimated at $1.2 billion. A ground-breaking ceremony for the new bridge was held on June 26, 2017. By 2019, construction on the new westbound span was underway, and required demolition of the existing eastbound viaduct in Moline. it was expected to be completed in 2020.

On November 13, 2020, the westbound side of the new bridge opened to motorists, the old bridges were permanently closed, and construction on the new eastbound bridge commenced. The bridge was officially dedicated on December 1, 2021. Speakers included Illinois Congresswoman Cheri Bustos, Illinois Governor J. B. Pritzker, and other state and local officials from both Illinois and Iowa. The eastbound span was opened the following evening. The pedestrian and bike path was opened on April 27, 2022. An elevator up to the walkway in Bettendorf has yet to be completed.

=== Demolition of the Old Spans ===
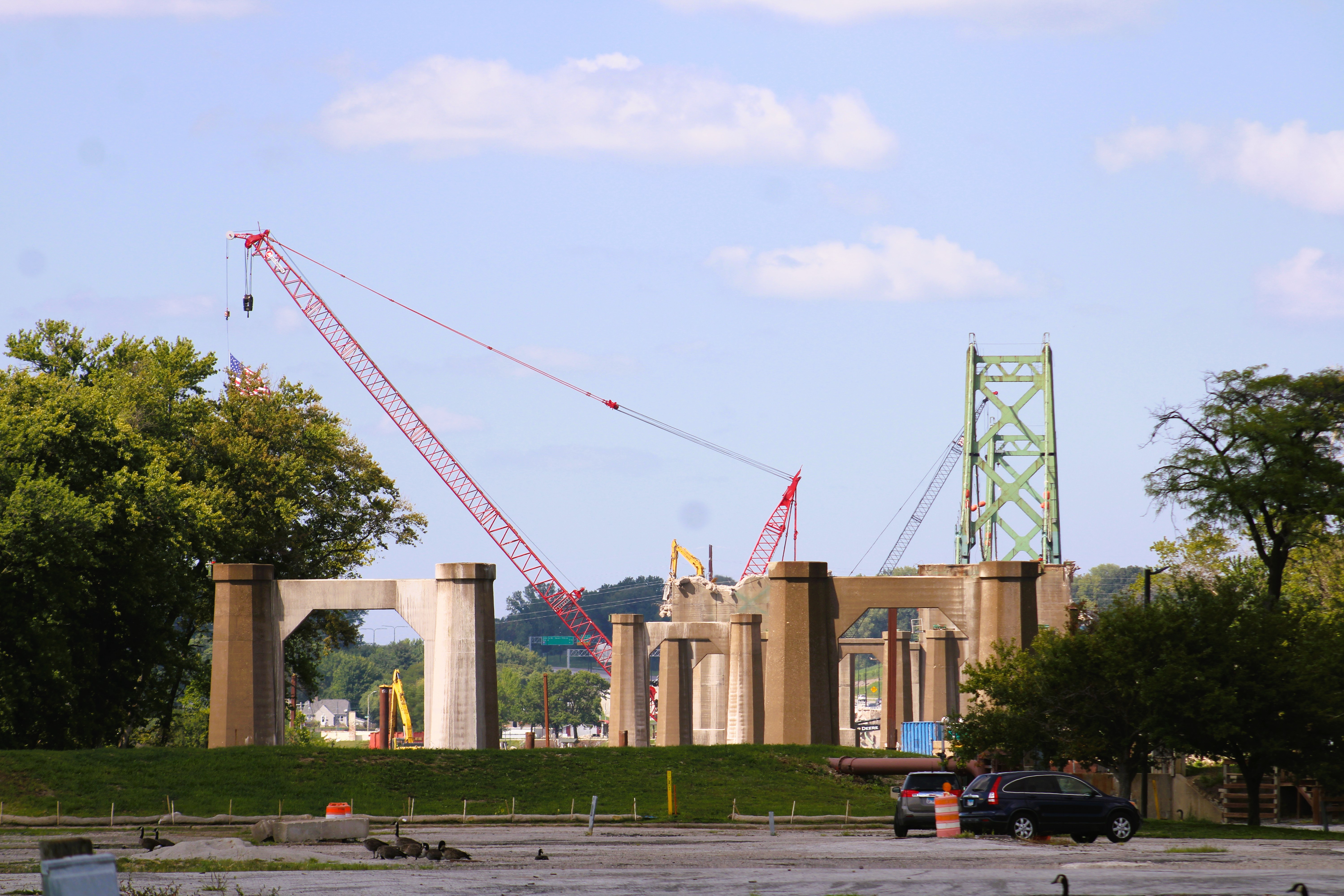
Demolition of the old bridge from Moline.

On June 9, 2022, demolition of the last approach viaducts was deemed mostly complete. The contract for deconstructing the suspension bridges was awarded in September 2022 to the Helm Group, which had had a part in constructing the new viaducts in downtown Bettendorf. Because it would be taken down piece-by-piece, demolition of the old bridge was not expected to be completed until early 2024. On May 17, 2023, it was announced that the towers and cables on the Illinois-bound side of the bridge would be demolished using explosive charges. The demolition would take place on a Sunday morning between June or July, though the exact date was not revealed. On June 18, 2023, the trusses of the deckless Illinois-bound span were detonated with explosives, leaving only a small part of the bottom superstructure to be removed in a future demolition. By July 2023, the Iowa-bound bridge's superstructure had been fully removed, with its steel sold as scrap metal. On August 27, 2023, the Iowa-bound trusses were blasted, in addition to the implosion of the Illinois-bound piers. The third detonation imploded the westbound piers on October 15, with the fourth and final implosion of the Illinois side's anchorage occurring in the early hours of February 18, 2024. One of each of the original piers was left in place at the back segment of the channel, with lights installed to reduce the likelihood of collision.

== See also ==
- List of crossings of the Upper Mississippi River
