= Cambridge Township, Crawford County, Pennsylvania =

Township in Pennsylvania, US

Coordinates: 41°47′00″N 80°02′59″W

- Township
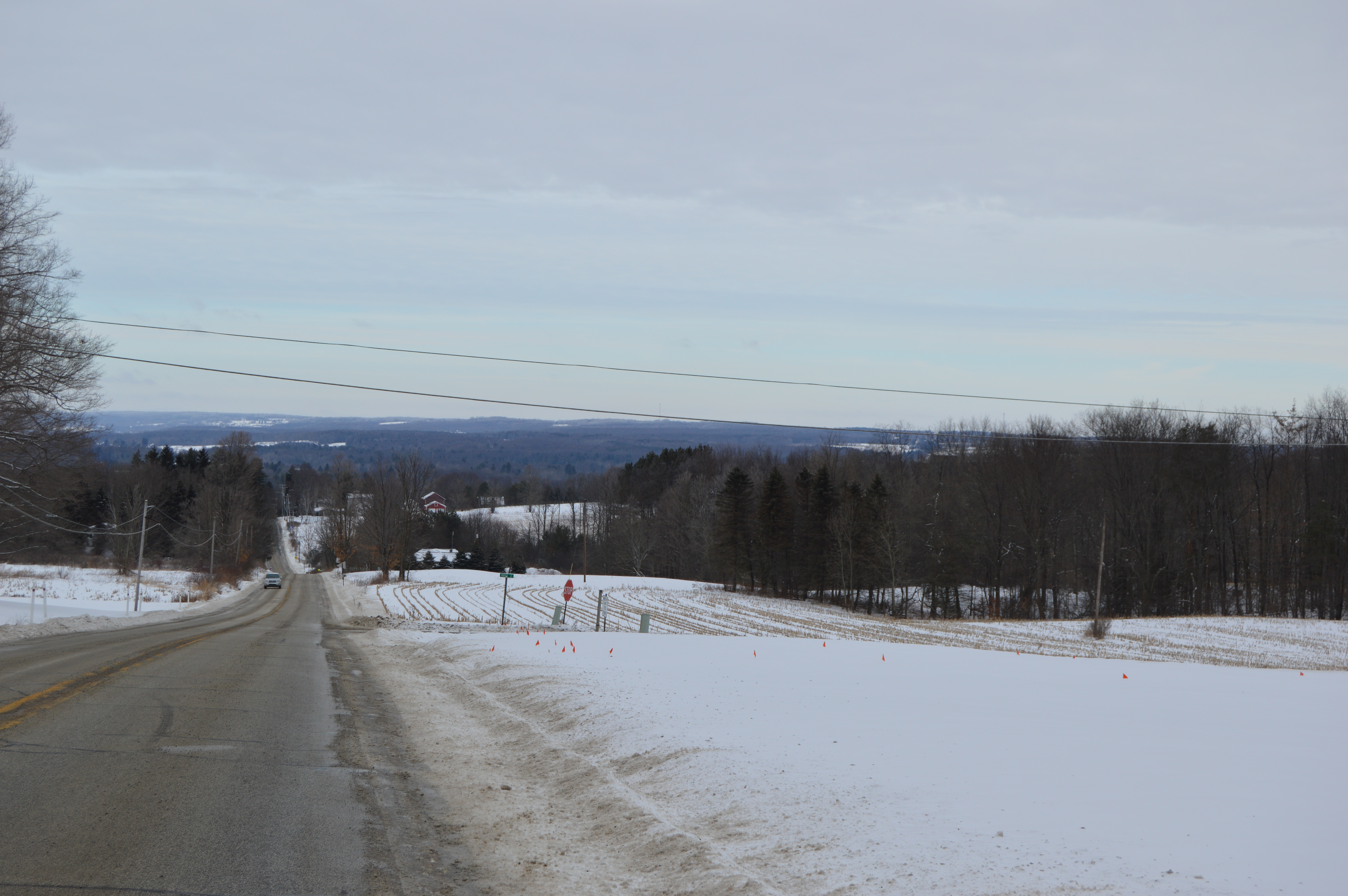
- Rolling hills south of Cambridge Springs

- Logo

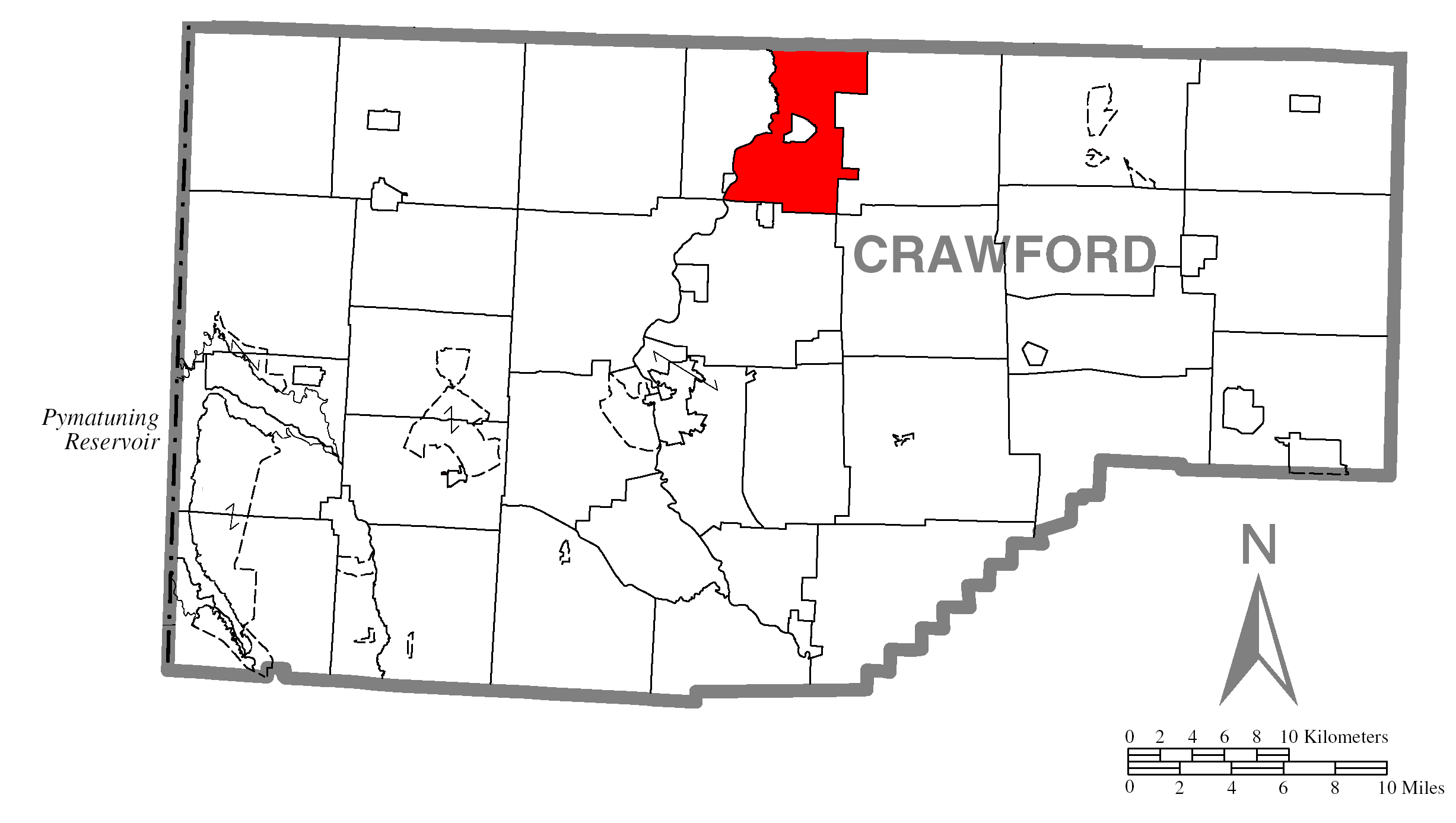
- Location of Cambridge Township in Crawford County

- Location of Crawford County in Pennsylvania
- Country: United States
- State: Pennsylvania
- County: Crawford

Area
  - Total: 21.59 sq mi (55.91 km^{2})
  - Land: 21.45 sq mi (55.55 km^{2})
  - Water: 0.14 sq mi (0.36 km^{2})
- Highest elevation (Southeast corner of township): 1,590 ft (480 m)
- Lowest elevation (French Creek at Township line): 1,130 ft (340 m)

Population (2020)
  - Total: 1,448
  - Estimate (2024): 1,423
  - Density: 67/sq mi (25.9/km^{2})
- Time zone: UTC-4 (EST)
  - Summer (DST): UTC-5 (EDT)
- Area code: 814
- FIPS code: 42-039-10904
- Website: www.cambridgetownship.org

Cambridge Township is a township in Crawford County, Pennsylvania, United States. The population was 1,448 at the 2020 census.

== Geography ==
The township is in northern Crawford County, bordered by Erie County to the north and by Conneauttee Creek and French Creek, part of the Allegheny River watershed, to the west. The township surrounds the borough of Cambridge Springs, a separate municipality. According to the United States Census Bureau, the Cambridge Township has a total area of 21.6 square miles (55.9 km^{2}), of which 21.5 square miles (55.6 km^{2}) is land and 0.2 square miles (0.4 km^{2}), or 0.64%, is water.

=== Natural features ===
Geologic Province: Northwestern Glaciated Plateau
Lowest Elevation: 1,130 ft (340 m) where French Creek flows out of the township.
Highest Elevation: 1,590 ft (480 m) in the southeastern corner
Major Rivers/Streams and Watersheds: French Creek
Minor Rivers/Streams and Watersheds: French Creek tributaries: Conneauttee Creek and its tributary, Little Conneauttee Creek, Campbell Run
Lakes and Waterbodies: Mitchell Lake (impoundment)
Biological Diversity Areas: Cambridge Springs BDA, French Creek BDA, French Creek Floodplain Forest BDA, and State Games Lands #277
Landscape Conservation Area: French Creek LCA

== Demographics ==
Historical population
Census	Pop.	Note	%±
2000	1,486		—
2010	1,563		5.2%
2020	1,448		−7.4%
2024 (est.)	1,423		−1.7%
U.S. Decennial Census

As of the census of 2000, there were 1,486 people, 594 households, and 443 families residing in the township. The population density was 69.1 inhabitants per square mile (26.7/km^{2}). There were 701 housing units at an average density of 32.6 per square mile (12.6/km^{2}). The racial makeup of the township was 98.05% White, 0.07% Native American, 0.47% Asian, 0.13% from other races, and 1.28% from two or more races. Hispanic or Latino of any race were 0.61% of the population.

There were 594 households, out of which 28.5% had children under the age of 18 living with them, 65.0% were married couples living together, 5.6% had a female householder with no husband present, and 25.4% were non-families. 21.2% of all households were made up of individuals, and 8.2% had someone living alone who was 65 years of age or older. The average household size was 2.50 and the average family size was 2.92.

In the township the population was spread out, with 22.9% under the age of 18, 6.8% from 18 to 24, 28.3% from 25 to 44, 28.3% from 45 to 64, and 13.7% who were 65 years of age or older. The median age was 41 years. For every 100 females there were 102.7 males. For every 100 females age 18 and over, there were 104.1 males.

The median income for a household in the township was $44,500, and the median income for a family was $50,104. Males had a median income of $36,389 versus $25,083 for females. The per capita income for the township was $19,500. About 5.6% of families and 7.8% of the population were below the poverty line, including 9.5% of those under age 18 and 7.3% of those age 65 or over.
