= Shenango Creek (Conneauttee Creek tributary) =

Stream in Pennsylvania, USA

Shenago Creek Tributary to Conneauttee Creek
- Location of Shenango Creek mouth Shenango Creek (Conneauttee Creek tributary) (the United States)

Location
- Country: United States
- State: Pennsylvania
- County: Erie

Physical characteristics
- Source: tributary to Edinboro Lake divide
  - location: about 1.5 miles northeast of Powers Corners, Pennsylvania
  - coordinates: 41°53′18″N 080°11′16″W
  - elevation: 1,435 ft (437 m)
- Mouth: Conneauttee Creek
  - location: about 1.5 miles north of Edinboro, Pennsylvania
  - coordinates: 41°53′43″N 080°08′51″W
  - elevation: 1,200 ft (370 m)
- Length: 4.13 mi (6.65 km)
- Basin size: 6.02 square miles (15.6 km^{2})
- Discharge
  - location: Conneauttee Creek
  - average: 11.08 cu ft/s (0.314 m^{3}/s) at mouth with Conneauttee Creek

Basin features
- Progression: north then southeast
- River system: Allegheny River
- Tributaries
  - left: unnamed tributaries
  - right: unnamed tributaries
- Bridges: Crane Road, Silverthorn Road, I-79, Fry Road, Crane Road, Lay Road

Shenango Creek is a 4.13 mi (6.65 km) long 2nd order tributary to Conneauttee Creek in Erie County, Pennsylvania.

== Course ==
Shenango Creek rises about 1.5 miles northeast of Powers Corners, Pennsylvania, and then flows north then curves southeast to join Conneauttee creek about 1.5 miles north of Edinboro.

== Watershed ==
Shenango Creek drains 6.02 square miles (15.6 km^{2}) of area, receives about 45.1 in/year of precipitation, has a wetness index of 481.03, and is about 38% forested.

== See also ==
- List of rivers of Pennsylvania
