= Washington Township, Erie County, Pennsylvania =

Township in Pennsylvania, US

Coordinates: 41°52′00″N 80°09′59″W

Washington Township
- Township
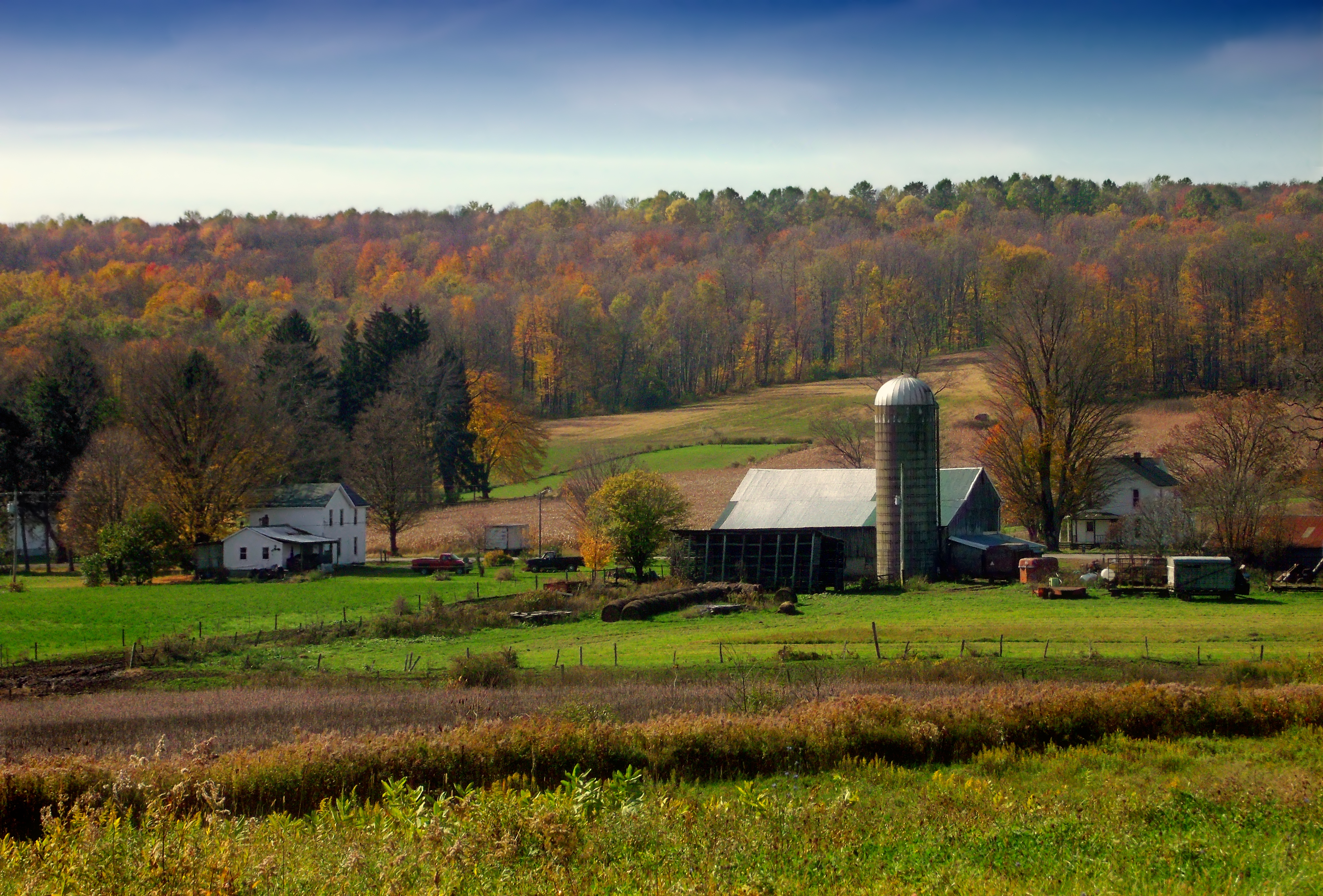
- A farm in the township

- Logo

- Location in Erie County and the U.S. state of Pennsylvania
- Country: United States
- State: Pennsylvania
- County: Erie

Area
  - Total: 45.62 sq mi (118.15 km^{2})
  - Land: 45.17 sq mi (116.98 km^{2})
  - Water: 0.45 sq mi (1.17 km^{2})

Population (2020)
  - Total: 4,396
  - Estimate (2023): 4,375
  - Density: 99.3/sq mi (38.33/km^{2})
- Time zone: UTC-4 (EST)
  - Summer (DST): UTC-5 (EDT)
- Area code: 814
- FIPS code: 42-049-81224
- Website: www.washington-township.info

Washington Township is a township in Erie County, Pennsylvania, United States. The population was 4,396 at the 2020 census, down from 4,432 at the 2010 census. The township surrounds the borough of Edinboro.

== Geography ==
Washington Township is in south-central Erie County, bordered to the south by Crawford County. Interstate 79 passes through the western part of the township, with access from Exit 166 (U.S. Route 6N).

According to the United States Census Bureau, the township has a total area of 45.6 square miles (118.1 km^{2}), of which 45.2 square miles (117.0 km^{2}) is land and 0.46 square miles (1.2 km^{2}), or 0.99%, is water. Edinboro Lake is partially in the township and partially in Edinboro.

== Demographics ==
Historical population
Census	Pop.	Note	%±
2000	4,526		—
2010	4,432		−2.1%
2020	4,396		−0.8%
2023 (est.)	4,375		−0.5%
U.S. Decennial Census

As of the census of 2000, there were 4,526 people, 1,639 households, and 1,276 families residing in the township. The population density was 100.1 inhabitants per square mile (38.6/km^{2}). There were 1,720 housing units at an average density of 38.1 per square mile (14.7/km^{2}). The racial makeup of the township was 98.21% White, 0.31% African American, 0.13% Native American, 0.20% Asian, 0.15% from other races, and 0.99% from two or more races. Hispanic or Latino of any race were 0.75% of the population.

There were 1,639 households, out of which 39.8% had children under the age of 18 living with them, 67.1% were married couples living together, 7.1% had a female householder with no husband present, and 22.1% were non-families. 17.0% of all households were made up of individuals, and 4.7% had someone living alone who was 65 years of age or older. The average household size was 2.76 and the average family size was 3.14.

In the township the population was spread out, with 28.3% under the age of 18, 8.0% from 18 to 24, 27.7% from 25 to 44, 28.0% from 45 to 64, and 8.0% who were 65 years of age or older. The median age was 38 years. For every 100 females, there were 105.9 males. For every 100 females age 18 and over, there were 99.8 males.

The median income for a household in the township was $51,759, and the median income for a family was $57,318. Males had a median income of $41,268 versus $31,151 for females. The per capita income for the township was $24,246. About 0.8% of families and 2.8% of the population were below the poverty line, including 0.4% of those under age 18 and 3.5% of those age 65 or over.
