= Cambridge station (disambiguation) =

Cambridge railway station serves Cambridge, England.

Cambridge station may also refer to:

- Cambridge station (Minnesota), United States
- Cambridge station, later Porter station, Cambridge, Massachusetts, United States

== See also ==
- Cambridge Springs station, formerly Cambridge, on the Erie Railroad in Pennsylvania, United States
- Cambridge St/ation, a volume of The Early Years 1965–1972 by Pink Floyd
- Cambridge North railway station Cambridge, England
- Cambridge South railway station Cambridge, England
