= Conneauttee Creek =

Stream in Pennsylvania, US

Conneauttee Creek Tributary to French Creek
- Location of Conneauttee Creek mouth Conneauttee Creek (the United States)

Location
- Country: United States
- State: Pennsylvania
- County: Crawford; Erie
- Borough: Cambridge Springs; Edinboro

Physical characteristics
- Source: Shenango Creek divide
  - location: about 1.5 miles southeast of McLane, Pennsylvania
  - coordinates: 41°55′24″N 080°09′27″W
  - elevation: 1,420 ft (430 m)
- Mouth: French Creek
  - location: Cambridge Springs, Pennsylvania
  - coordinates: 41°48′40″N 080°04′43″W
  - elevation: 1,129 ft (344 m)
- Length: 13.26 mi (21.34 km)
- Basin size: 60.49 square miles (156.7 km^{2})
- Discharge
  - location: French Creek
  - average: 104.73 cu ft/s (2.966 m^{3}/s) at mouth with French Creek

Basin features
- Progression: French Creek → Allegheny River → Ohio River → Mississippi River → Gulf of Mexico
- River system: Allegheny River
- Tributaries
  - left: Darrows Creek; Little Conneauttee Creek
  - right: Shenango Creek; Torry Run
- Waterbodies: Edinboro Lake unnamed impoundment by Drakes Mills
- Bridges: Lay Road, Neyland Road, Crane Road, US 6N, Chestnut Street, W Normal Street, Kinter Hill Road, PA 99, Perry Lane, Beason Road, Jericho Road, PA 99, McClellan Street

Conneauttee Creek is a 13.26 mi (21.34 km) long 4th order tributary to French Creek in Crawford County, Pennsylvania. This is the only stream of this name in the United States.

== Variant names ==
According to the Geographic Names Information System, it has also been known historically as:

- Big Conneauttee Creek
- Conneautte Creek

== Course ==
Conneautee Creek rises about 1.5 miles southeast of McLane, Pennsylvania, and then flows generally south and southeast, through Edinboro Lake to join French Creek just northwest of Cambridge Springs, Pennsylvania.

== Watershed ==
Conneauttee Creek drains 60.49 square miles (156.7 km^{2}) of area, receives about 45.2 in/year of precipitation, has a wetness index of 466.55, and is about 49% forested.

== See also ==
- List of rivers of Pennsylvania
