= Cambridge Springs station =

Cambridge Springs
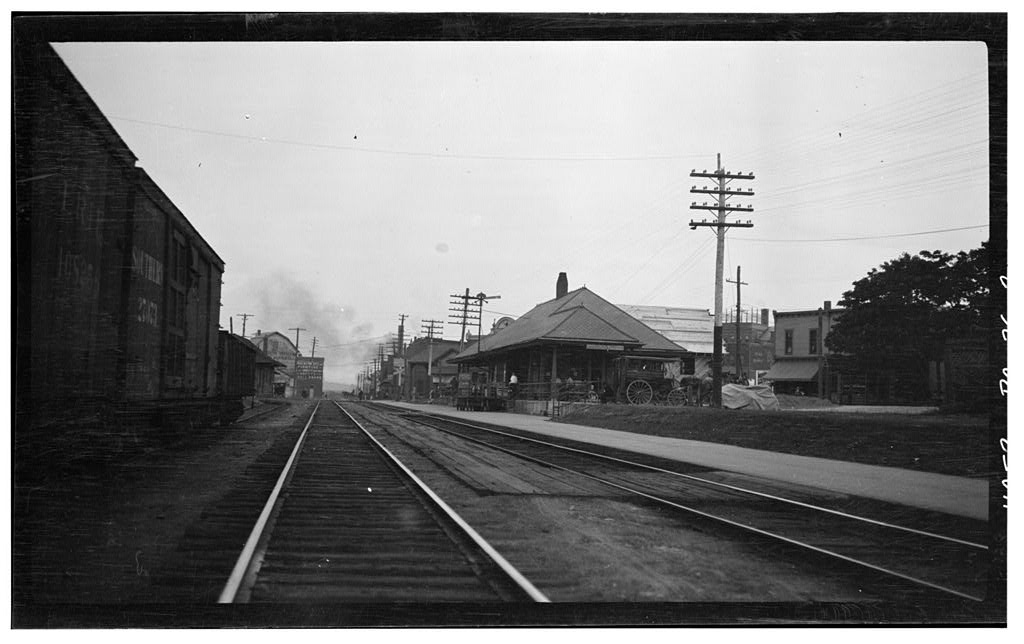
- The former Cambridge Springs depot, seen in 1916.

General information
- Location: 302 Venango Avenue (US 6 / US 19), Cambridge Springs, Crawford County, Pennsylvania.
- Coordinates: 41.8033°N 80.0602°W
- Line: Main Line (Meadville Division)
- Platforms: 1 side platform
- Tracks: 2
- Connections: Northwestern Pennsylvania Railway

Other information
- Station code: 5121

History
- Opened: October 27, 1862 (Atlantic and Great Western Railway); October 19, 1900 (Meadville and Cambridge Springs Street Railway)
- Closed: September 28, 1928 (Northwestern Pennsylvania Railway); August 1, 1965 (Erie-Lackawanna Railroad)

Former services
| Preceding station | Erie Railroad | Following station |
|---|---|---|
| Venango toward Chicago | Main Line | Miller's toward Jersey City |
Location

Cambridge Springs (formerly Cambridge) was a railroad station for the Erie Railroad in Cambridge Springs, Crawford County, Pennsylvania, United States. Cambridge Springs station was on the Main Line's Meadville Division, which was the section of the line between Salamanca, New York, and Meadville, Pennsylvania. The station was located 501.2 miles (806.6 km) from Manhattan and the Barclay Street Ferry, which connected to Pavonia Terminal in Jersey City, New Jersey, and 480.8 miles (773.8 km) from Hoboken Terminal in Hoboken, New Jersey. For nearly three decades, the station had connections to the Northwestern Pennsylvania Railway, which was a trolley line that connected the city of Erie and Meadville. Modern Erie Railroad station signage denoted the station as "Home of Alliance College," a local private university that closed in 1987.

Service to Cambridge Springs began in October 1862, with completion of the Atlantic and Great Western Railway to Meadville, a 6 ft (1,829 mm) railway that originally went from Salamanca to Corry, Pennsylvania, until work was suspended in 1861 due to financial issues. The Atlantic and Great Western would later be completed in June 1864, with connection to the Cincinnati, Hamilton and Dayton Railroad in Dayton, Ohio. Ownership of the line was transferred in 1880 to the New York, Pennsylvania and Ohio Railroad, a subsidiary of the Erie Railroad. Meanwhile, a trolley line was completed through Cambridge Springs from Meadville, which was completed on October 19, 1900. The trolley station was constructed in 1903. The new Meadville and Cambridge Springs Street Railway was extended to Linesville, Pennsylvania, where it connected to the Pennsylvania Railroad. In November 1912, the railway was merged with the nearby Erie Traction Line, becoming the new Northwestern Pennsylvania Railway.

Located near some mineral springs, Cambridge Springs became a popular place for people to visit. On October 26, 1912, President of the United States William Howard Taft visited Cambridge Springs to visit the mineral springs, coming from nearby Edinboro, Pennsylvania. A second benefit of being located on the main line, was that Cambridge Springs was halfway between New York City and Chicago. In 1904, the municipality was host to the Cambridge Springs International Chess Congress, an international chess tournament that was the first held in the United States since the turn of the 20th century. Sponsored by the Erie Railroad, the tournament was held from April 25–May 19. In October 1924, the halfway point was dedicated by Erie Railroad officials, with 175 members of the railroad attending a nearby convention and being hosted in nearby hotels.

However, the decline of railway service in Cambridge Springs began in 1912, with a series of accidents on the Northwestern Pennsylvania, which caused a big-money lawsuit. In December 1919, the company was forcibly sold to the Erie Trust Company, and in 1922, the company merged with the People's Incandescent Light Company, creating a monopolization of services in Erie and Crawford counties. After a bus line was established in 1925, the service on the trolley line continued to decline, and on September 1, 1928, services on the line through Cambridge Springs was terminated. Service on the Erie Railroad continued, even after it merged with the Lackawanna Railroad. Prior to the merger, the station saw only three stops daily, and by 1965, the last trains servicing Cambridge Springs, the Pacific Express and the Atlantic Express, marking the last passenger service to Cambridge Springs, were canceled.

The depot for the Erie Railroad, located at 302 Venango Avenue was demolished in 1964 after a deal was reached with the borough of Cambridge Springs and replaced with the Cambridge Springs Volunteer Firefighter Department building. The former Northwestern Pennsylvania Railway station, modeled to look similar to the Erie Railroad depot, continues to stand on Venango Avenue, along with the monument marking the halfway point, not far from the old depot site.

== Construction and service ==
=== Atlantic & Great Western / Erie Railroad ===
The first railroad that was proposed through Cambridge Springs, Pennsylvania, then named Cambridge, was the Franklin and Warren Railroad, a proposed railway by Marvin Kent in 1851. This new railroad, slated to go between Franklin, Pennsylvania, and Warren, Ohio, was surveyed on October 26, 1852 by officials of the Franklin and Warren, as well as executives from the Erie Railroad. Construction of the new railroad would commence in July 1853, about two months after construction began on the Erie and New York City Railroad, a 35-mile (56 km) long line through Salamanca, Dayton and Dunkirk, bypassing the city of Jamestown. Construction commenced on the Erie and New York City on May 19, 1853, but was abandoned on January 7, 1855 due to the funding being scant.

In April 1857, the Pennsylvania State Legislature approved the creation of the Meadville Railroad Company, which would construct a brand new railroad from Meadville, Pennsylvania, to nearby Erie, Pennsylvania. The company became official on July 13, 1857, and ten days later, the Pittsburgh and Erie Railroad turned over their rights to a branch so the Meadville Railroad could construct other branch lines, including the new Atlantic and Great Western Railroad, created in 1853 when the Franklin and Warren changed names. The railroad accepted the offer and looked for money with the A.C. Morton, a contractor, to construct the railroad. However, the company was unable to get money from a trip to Europe and the contract was voided. The Meadville Railroad would change its name in April 1858 to the Atlantic and Great Western Railroad as well.

On a second voyage to Europe in July 1858, executives were able to convince James McHenry to pay for the railroad, on the condition one of his engineers surveyed the new route. At the same time, José de Salamanca, a nobleman and banker from Spain agreed as well, donating $1 million (1858 USD) in bonds to the effort. In May 1859, the Atlantic and Great Western Railroad Company of New York was founded and agrees with sharing bonds between it and the Pennsylvania and Ohio equivalents. This also buys the Erie and New York City Railroad, which had been abandoned for four years. Construction of the Atlantic and Great Western begins in May 1860, with the first piece (Salamanca–Jamestown) opening on September 11. On May 7, 1861, the railroad was extended to Corry, Pennsylvania.

However, that summer, the finances were too little and construction was suspended. After a third trip to Europe for funding, the three companies merged in March 1862, allowing funding to continue to construct the railroad once again starting in the fall. Construction reached Cambridge in 1862, and on October 27, the Atlantic and Great Western Railroad was completed through to Meadville. This marked the first railroad through Cambridge, and by 1864, there were four trains daily that passed through but did not stop at Cambridge, two westward express night and day trains as well as two eastern. By the next year, a mail train from Cleveland to Salamanca and vice versa was stopping at Cambridge, one at 10:52 am westbound and 1:52 pm eastbound. On April 3, 1866, the borough of Cambridge was established as a separate entity from Cambridge Township.

In 1873, the Atlantic and Great Western Railroad, now under the ownership of Jay Gould and other investors, bought two franchises for new railways that would fork off the main line in Cambridge. One of these proposed lines was the Pennsylvania Petroleum Railroad, a road out to Titusville, along with a route that crossed through Drake's Mill and Edinboro for moving oil to the ports in Erie from Titusville, which had become a big oil region after its discovery on August 27, 1859. However, the oil rush had died off, and though some grading had been done along modern-day Route 408 outside of Cambridge Springs, the railroads were abandoned. By 1889, ten passenger trains stopped in Cambridge, and as a result, over 80,000 people commuted to or from Cambridge that year. This estimate of over 80,000 yearly passengers remain stable, with the same number being reported in 1898. Although the new depot in Cambridge Springs was reportedly built in 1891 according to the Historic American Engineering Record, the report to the Interstate Commerce Commission recorded its construction date as 1914 due to track tie-ups during derailments, the Erie had to redo the track through Cambridge Springs, resulting in several places where the eastbound and westbound tracks would cross, reducing the problems for trains crossing at the odd angle through town. This resulted in the existing depot at Cambridge Springs being demolished and replaced with a new structure on Venango Avenue.

=== Trolley lines ===
In 1891, the Erie Transit Company was chartered by the state of Pennsylvania as a brand new trolley line from Cambridge to the borough of Edinboro, connecting several local communities through the area. The line ran over the Erie and Edinboro Plank Road (currently Route 99), which was completed in 1852. Another line went through Cambridge, the Meadville Street Railway Company, which came into existence on February 29, 1896. This line was proposed to run from Meadville out to Cambridge and onto Edinboro, which opened on April 14, 1898. During this time, the borough of Cambridge changed into Cambridge Springs, and two more trolley lines had been proposed. One, the Meadville and Saegertown Street Railway was to run from Saegertown to Meadville, while the other, the Saegertown and Venango Street Railway ran along modern-U.S. Route 19 to reach Venango. There was a shift right after construction began on the Meadville–Saegertown line, which instead followed modern-day Route 86 and Route 198 to Saegertown. The first service of the line between Edinboro and Erie began on October 19, 1900, while the line that split off towards Meadville was completed in 1903.

By May 2, 1909, the new electrified railway had twenty-seven trains going through Cambridge Springs, serving as the connection to Meadville. A traveler who used the line from Cambridge Springs to Erie would expect a commute of about 85 minutes. However, On November 6, 1912, it was agreed that the two services would merge and become one operation, the Northwestern Pennsylvania Railway, providing direct service between Erie and Meadville.

== 1904 chess tournament ==
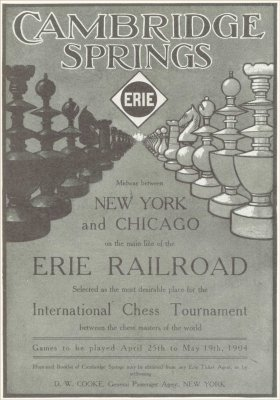
An advertisement of the 1904 Cambridge Springs International Chess Congress, sponsored by the Erie Railroad, held in Cambridge Springs

Cambridge Springs was the host of the first major chess competition held in the United States in the 20th century, with the competition being held at the borough's Rider Hotel, a majestic, six-story structure constructed from 1895–1897. The hotel, which became a large booster of traffic to Cambridge Springs for the mineral spring spas, held a major theater inside, and from April 25–May 19, 1904, an international chess conference was held. This chess conference, called a "congress", had sponsorship from several people, including the Erie Railroad, along with the owner of the hotel, William D. Rider. The Erie exploited the tournament, as the station agent at Cambridge Springs would be giving away informational booklets about Cambridge Springs, taking out full-page advertisements to sponsor the tournament, with the railroad in large capital letters. The tournament in itself was a major success, bringing many people from the United States and Europe, eventually won by Frank Marshall (1877–1944) in an upset over David Janowski.

There was intent to hold another chess conference in 1905 in Cambridge Springs, however, the death of William Rider on September 13, 1905, who had a major piece in creating the original, killed off any hopes for a second tournament. The following owners after Rider could not maintain the amount of popularity the hotel had under Rider, changing names to the Vanadium. However, this was not enough and in 1911 the Rider Hotel was sold to the Polish National Alliance, who used the hotel as Alliance College. Alliance College opened in 1912, with almost 9,000 students and a dedication ceremony involving President of the United States William Howard Taft. The former hotel, which housed the entire college, burned down in a 1931 fire. The college would rebuild on the site off Beach Avenue, as well as be signed at the Erie Railroad depot, but only remain open until 1987, when it closed. Four years later, the state of Pennsylvania took the current site and turned it into State Correctional Institution – Cambridge Springs, a prison for women.

== Decline in service ==
=== Northwestern Pennsylvania Railway ===
Although trolley service in Cambridge Springs had been beneficial to rural farmers, connecting them to marketplaces and when a farmer sold land along it, the railroad would be an attractive draw for potential buyers. However, it was not unknown that the Northwestern Pennsylvania Railway would have problems with the farmers. On December 8, 1912, a train crashed into a flock of 80 sheep, killing 17 of them instantly. On May 31, 1913, a cow from another farm wandered on the right-of-way in Nicholson Hill and was killed the second the trolley made contact. No passengers were killed or injured, however.

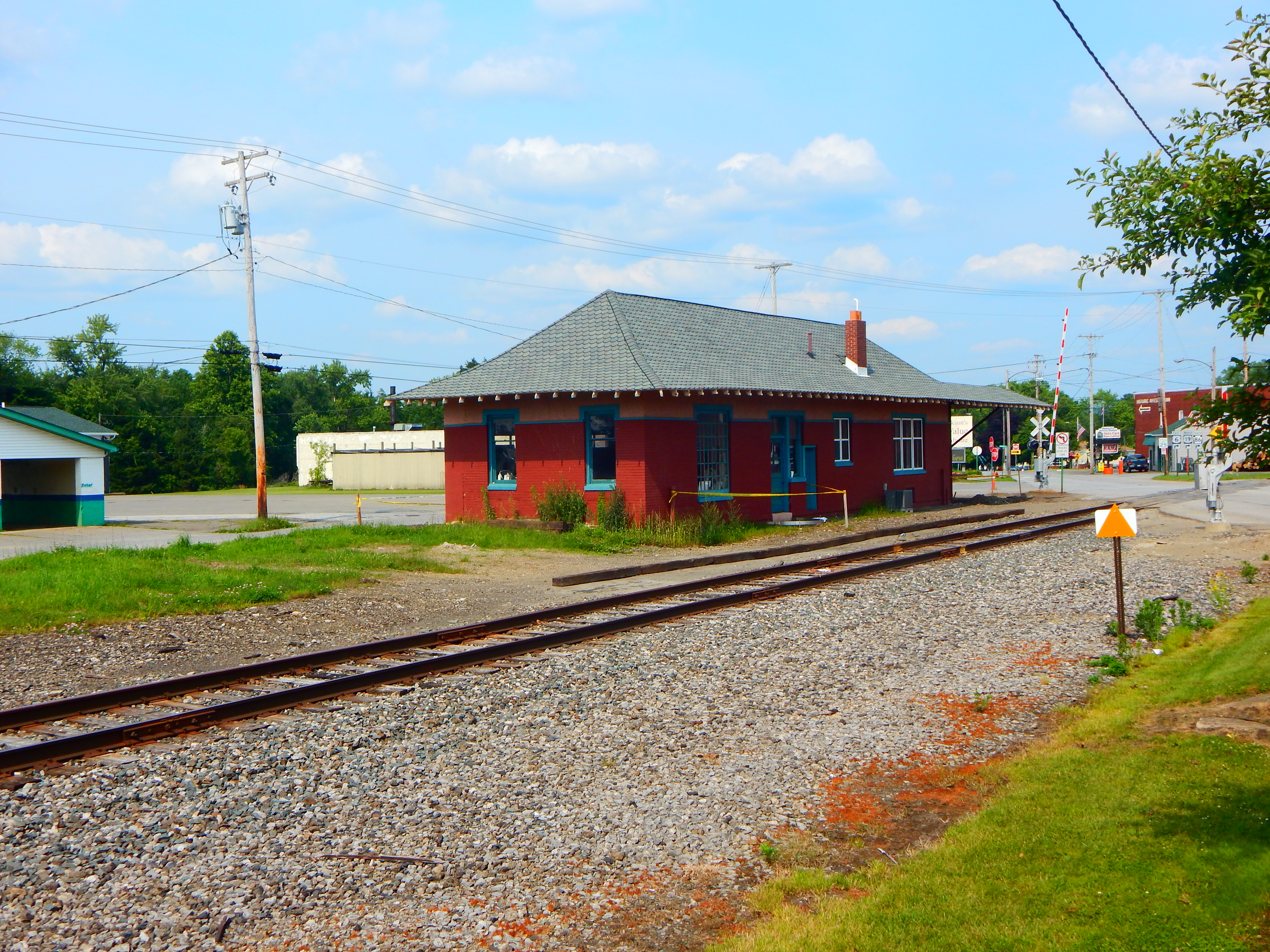
The former Northwest Pennsylvania Railroad station in Cambridge Springs in July 2015

The decline of service in Cambridge Springs, however, began in the late 1910s, when the Northwestern Pennsylvania Railway had accrued a significant debt since 1912, totaling $493,937.50 (1919 USD). This debt became too much for the company to afford, and the railroad was put up for sale immediately in December 1919, with a sale to be run on December 27. On the day of the sale, Felix Curtz of the Erie Trust Company bought the trolley line for a total of $115,000 (1919 USD). The extension lines to Meadville and Linesville were sold only for $2,500. The railroad retained its name for another few years, until the trolley company was merged with the Peoples' Incandescent Light Company of Pennsylvania, becoming the Northwestern Electric Service Company, a corporation that dealt with electricity, trolley operation, heat and power for the entirety of Northwestern Pennsylvania. In 1925, with the introduction of bus service to Erie and Meadville, the decline of the trolleys expanded even further. Service was cut from downtown Meadville in September 1927, service was ended to Linesville the same year. The Meadville and Conneaut Park line was canceled in August 1928. Finally, the last service of trolley lines through Cambridge Springs, which went from Meadville to Erie, was ended on September 28, 1928.

However, a remnant of the trolley services remains in Cambridge Springs, as the former trolley station continues to stand on Venango Avenue, across the tracks from the site of the former Erie Railroad station. The station re-opened as a museum in June 2017 run by the Northwestern Pennsylvania Heritage Partnership, who purchased the building in 2014.

=== Erie Railroad ===
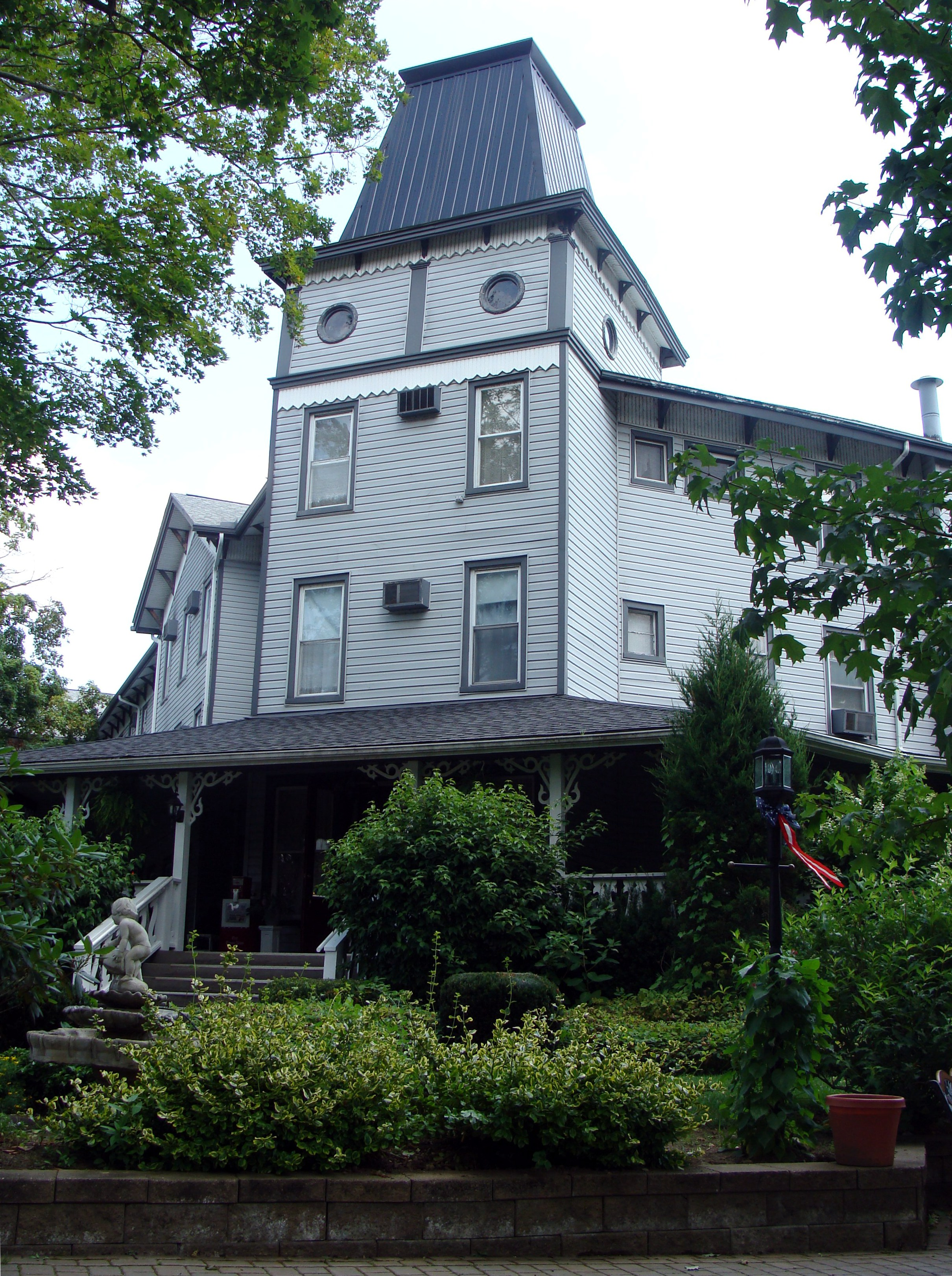
The Riverside Inn in Cambridge Springs, where the convention was held. The inn burned down on May 2, 2017.

In October 1924, the Erie Railroad documented the location of the Cambridge Springs depot as the halfway point of the line between New York and Chicago. Located historically at 501.2 miles (806.6 km) from New York, a monument was made to recognize the spot, with a celebration in October. Over 175 railroad station agents and their spouses attended the ceremony which unveiled a marble monument stating the halfway point. The event was held at the Bartlett and Riverside hotels in Cambridge Springs, during a convention of the Erie Railroad. The 132-year old Riverside Inn was demolished in a fire that ravaged the building on May 2, 2017.

By August 1911, the Erie Railroad operated ten trains through Cambridge Springs, nine that would accept passengers and one that would only discharge passengers who boarded from Hornell. By 1916, the Erie had cut this down to six daily (three in each direction). After those cuts, the schedule of trains through Cambridge Springs became steady for over a decade, as by 1927, the schedule of services had not changed, with westbound trains to Meadville, Cleveland and Chicago and eastbound trains to New York City via Jersey City, New Jersey. With the debut of the Erie Limited on June 2, 1929, the service at Cambridge Springs was further curtailed, with two daily regular passenger stops in each direction, a train that ran six days a week in each direction to Meadville, and a request stop in each direction on the Chicago Express. The Erie Limited did not stop at Cambridge Springs. By September 1931, a mixed train (freight and passenger), Nos. 37 and 38, had been added between Jamestown, New York, and Meadville, serving as an extra train through Cambridge Springs. When timetables came out in June 1933, another mixed train was added in each direction. However, by November, all the mixed trains had been deleted from the schedule.

During the presidency of Frederick Douglas Underwood, the Erie Railroad had accrued some serious debt, and although the railroad survived well under Underwood, the railroad was in need of modernization, which other railroads had begun to do. Although the Erie's financial problems were serious, they were not unsolvable, as Henry Sturgis, a banker from New York City suggested to Underwood. The proposed solution was to work on the Erie's bonds, but that ended up not being a solution that was done, and the Erie's financial troubles continued. After Underwood's retirement, the following presidents were unable to help the Erie, due to various government regulations and in 1929, the stock market crash and the Great Depression killed any hopes for financial stability, as it killed a lot of the railroad's business in the freight industry. From 1929–1932, the passenger business fell 50%, but this stabilized in later years, with only a 2% drop from 1933–1936. In 1937, President Charles Denney and the railroad filed for its fourth bankruptcy, which ended up being a partial benefit to keeping the railroad afloat for passenger service. During this time, the Erie also took a massive hit in railroad territory, causing "tremendous" losses during the latter half of 1937. Despite the filing for bankruptcy with the Interstate Commerce Commission, the Erie became the first railroad of many to return to making a profit and exit bankruptcy. In 1941, an agreement was made in federal courts to reorganize the Erie, which also took control of the Cleveland and Mahoning Valley Railway, a rail line it had been leasing since the 1880s. The New York, Susquehanna and Western Railroad and New Jersey and New York Railroad were both released from control of the Erie, but critics felt the changes did not reduce the Erie's serious debt by that point.

By September 1939, the Erie Railroad through Cambridge Springs had become stable once again, with numerous trains in each direction stopping at Cambridge Springs, including the Erie Limited, Atlantic Express and sister Pacific Express, the brand-new Midlander and the Lake Cities, all of which served as through trains between New York and Cleveland or Chicago. This would remain the same until 1944, when the Midlander and the Lake Cities would merge into one train (the Midlander–Lake Cities), going from Chicago to Cleveland to New York and vice versa. By 1945, the Erie Limited had reduced Cambridge Springs and nearby Union City stations to a request stop rather than a regular stop. In September 1947, another change was made as the Midlander ceased to exist, just returning as the Lake Cities, but retaining the route of the merged trains. In June 1948, the eastbound Lake Cities reduced Cambridge Springs to only discharge customers from Youngstown and west except on Mondays, where it would receive passengers. With the debut of diesel engine locomotives in January 1949, this was changed to just a routine request stop, which ran on the aforementioned engines.

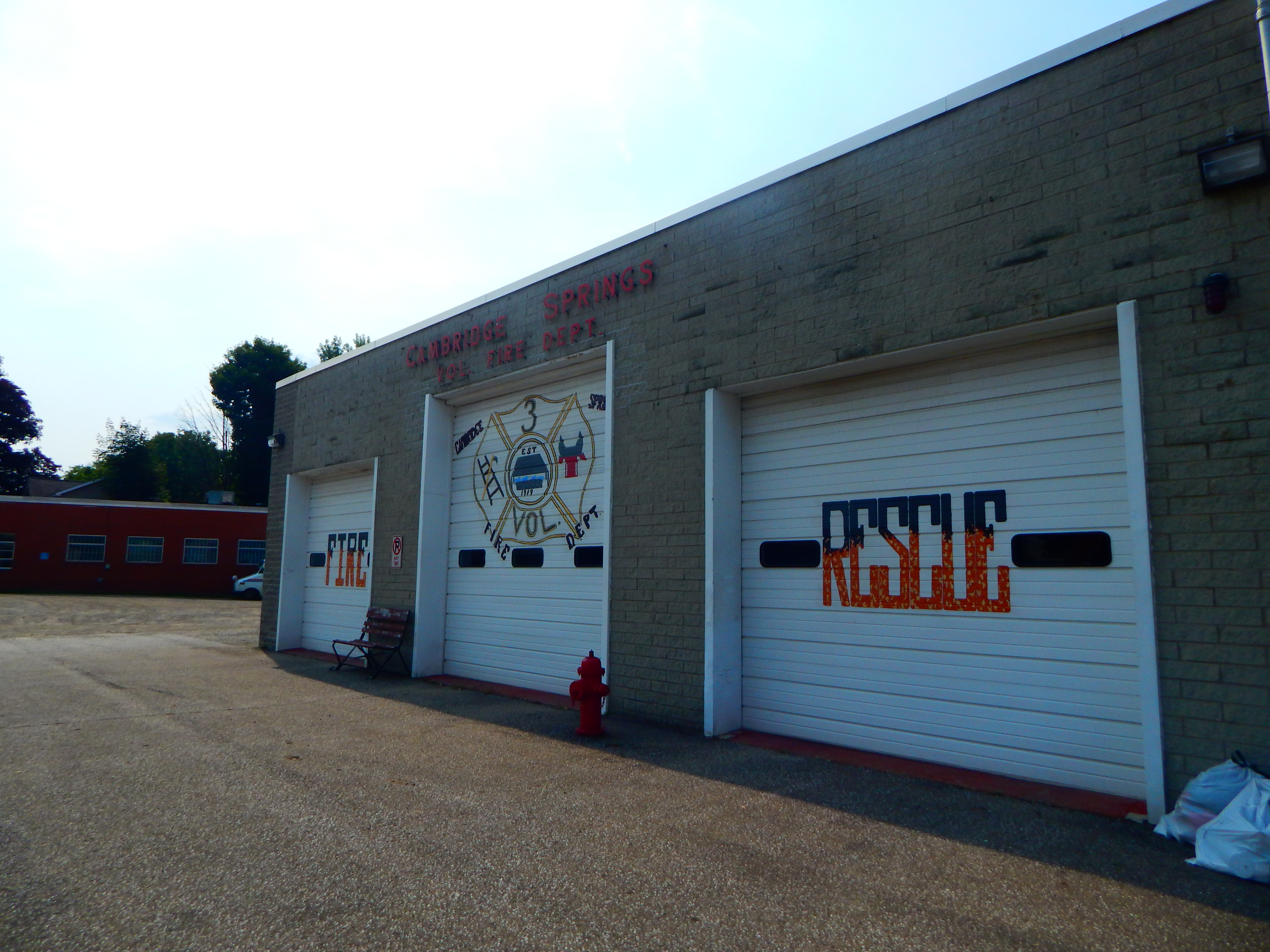
The Cambridge Springs Volunteer Fire Department in July 2015, the structure that replaced the depot

On October 2, 1957, the Erie president Harry Von Willer announced that the railroad would donate the land of the depot, which would be used for a new fire station for the Cambridge Springs Volunteer Department and Relief Association. A rare agreement between the railroad and community, the site coming at free of charge was one of the first times ever that such a transaction occurred. The new fire station would have a modern waiting room for passengers of the remaining trains going through Cambridge Springs as well as an office for the agent. New parking areas and driveways would be constructed and the Erie promised to pay for painting its section of the building as well as bringing in the furniture. Upon completion, the Erie agreed to raze the 1914 depot and landscape the foundation.

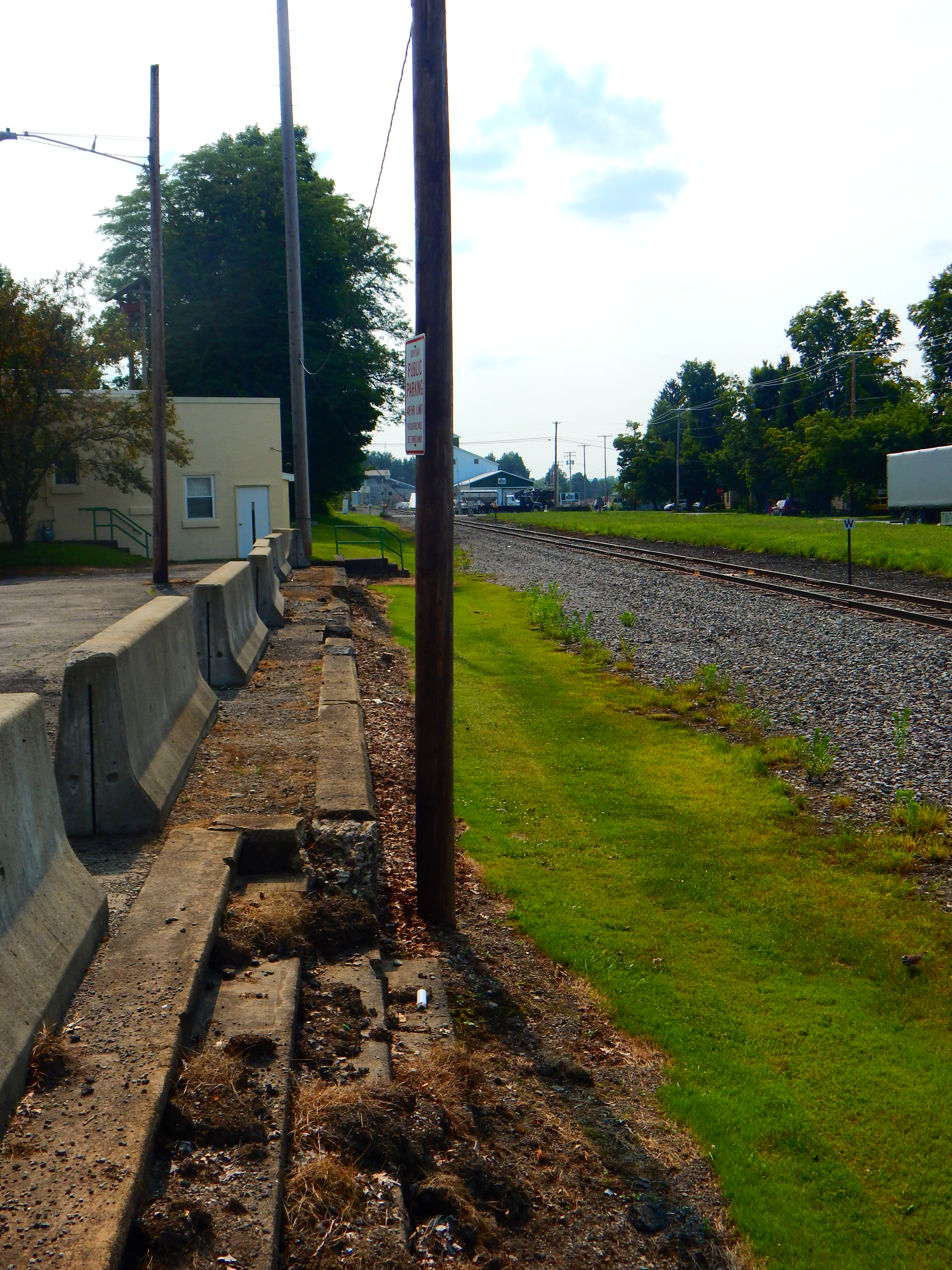
Cambridge Springs station's former platform and stairs in July 2015

The same trains, the Erie Limited, Lake Cities, Atlantic Express, and the Pacific Express, remained running through Cambridge Springs, but changes for the Erie Railroad were on the horizon, as in 1957, the Erie Railroad and Lackawanna Railroad announced that they would share tracks between Binghamton, New York, and Gibson, a suburb of Elmira, New York. This would set the stage for the merger of the two companies, who could no longer afford to own separate tracks through the area. In 1956, service to Pavonia Terminal in Jersey City had also consolidated, with all through trains going to the Lackawanna's Hoboken Terminal in Hoboken, New Jersey, instead. On October 17, 1960, after getting permission from the Interstate Commerce Commission, the two railroads merged into the Erie-Lackawanna Railway. Despite the changeover, the Erie-Lackawanna retained the four trains through Cambridge Springs, now numbered E-1, E-2 E-5, E-6, E-7 and E-8 on the October 30, 1960 timetables. However, by October 1961, the names on several trains had been changed as the Lake Cities became the Chicago Lake Cities due to a new one being sent to Buffalo, New York, as well the Erie Limited becoming the Erie-Lackawanna Limited. This was quickly reverted to Lake Cities by April 1962.

On September 29, 1963, the Erie-Lackawanna Limited was discontinued in favor of an extended version of the famous Phoebe Snow, which went to Chicago instead. In 1964, the new firehouse for Cambridge Springs was completed, the station depot was demolished. In April 1965, the Lake Cities was replaced by the World's Fair, in honor of the 1964-65 World's Fair going on in Flushing Meadows-Corona Park in Queens, New York. However, passenger railroad services ended entirely when the Erie-Lackawanna canceled the Atlantic Express and Pacific Express on August 1, 1965.

== Bibliography ==
- History of Erie County, Pennsylvania: Containing a History of the County, Its Townships, Towns, Villages, Schools, Churches, Industries, Etc., Portraits of Early Settlers and Prominent Men, Biographies, History of Pennsylvania, Statistical and Miscellaneous Matter, Etc., Etc, Volume 1. Evansville, Indiana: Unigraphic. 1884.
- Crisman, Sharon Smith (2003). Images of America: Around Cambridge Springs. Mount Pleasant, South Carolina: Arcadia Publishing. ISBN 9780738513270.
- DeYoung, Larry (1992). Erie Lackawanna in Color: Volume 2: New York State. Edison Township, New Jersey: Morning Sun Books. ISBN 9781878887122.
- Grant, H. Roger (October 1996). Erie Lackawanna: The Death of an American Railroad, 1938-1992. Palo Alto, California: Stanford University Press. ISBN 9780804727983.
- Perich, Terry; Perich, Kathleen (2006). Postcard History: Around Cambridge Springs and Edinboro. Mount Pleasant, South Carolina: Arcadia Publishing. ISBN 9780738545288.
- Springirth, Kenneth C. (2006). Images of America: Greater Erie Trolleys. Mount Pleasant, South Carolina: Arcadia Publishing. ISBN 9780738539386.
- Yanosey, Robert (2007). Erie Railroad Facilities in Color: Volume 3: Pennsylvania, Ohio, Indiana and Illinois. Scotch Plains, New Jersey: Morning Sun Books. ISBN 9781582482088.
