= Torry Run =

Stream in Pennsylvania, USA

Torry Run Tributary to Conneauttee Creek
- Location of Torry Run mouth Torry Run (the United States)

Location
- Country: United States
- State: Pennsylvania
- County: Crawford; Erie

Physical characteristics
- Source: tributary to Conneauttee Creek divide
  - location: about 1.5 miles southwest of Edinboro, Pennsylvania
  - coordinates: 41°51′13″N 080°09′23″W
  - elevation: 1,460 ft (450 m)
- Mouth: Conneauttee Creek
  - location: about 0.5 miles south of Drakes Mills, Pennsylvania
  - coordinates: 41°49′05″N 080°04′43″W
  - elevation: 1,131 ft (345 m)
- Length: 5.83 mi (9.38 km)
- Basin size: 5.44 square miles (14.1 km^{2})
- Discharge
  - location: Conneauttee Creek
  - average: 9.97 cu ft/s (0.282 m^{3}/s) at mouth with Conneauttee Creek

Basin features
- Progression: generally southeast
- River system: Allegheny River
- Tributaries
  - left: unnamed tributaries
  - right: unnamed tributaries
- Bridges: Florek Road, Capp Road, Florek Road (x2), PA 99, Jericho Road, PA 99, Racop Road, Drakes Mill Road

Torry Run is a 5.83 mi (9.38 km) long 2nd order tributary to Conneauttee Creek in Crawford County, Pennsylvania and Erie County, Pennsylvania. This is the only stream of this name in the United States.

== Course ==
Torry Run rises about 1.5 miles southwest of Edinboro, Pennsylvania, and then flows generally southeast to join Conneauttee creek about 0.5 miles south of Drakes Mills.

== Watershed ==
Torry Run drains 5.44 square miles (14.1 km^{2}) of area, receives about 45.0 in/year of precipitation, has a wetness index of 469.47, and is about 51% forested.

== See also ==
- List of rivers of Pennsylvania
