= Pennsylvania Route 99 =

State highway in Pennsylvania, US

Pennsylvania Route 99
- SR 699

Route information
- Maintained by PennDOT
- Length: 21.04 mi (33.86 km)

Major junctions
- South end: US 6 / US 19 in Cambridge Springs
- US 6N in Edinboro
- North end: US 19 near Erie

Location
- Country: United States
- State: Pennsylvania
- Counties: Crawford, Erie

Highway system
- Pennsylvania State Route System; Interstate; US; State; Scenic; Legislative
← I-99	→ PA 100
← PA 696	SR 0699	→ PA 701

Pennsylvania Route 99 (PA 99), officially SR 699, is a 21-mile-long (34 km) state highway located in western Pennsylvania. The southern terminus is at U.S. Route 6 (US 6) and US 19 in Cambridge Springs. The northern terminus is at US 19 near Erie.

Along its routing, PA 99 is known as Interchange Road, Edinboro Road, Main Street, Forest Street, Erie Street, Meadville Street, and McClellan Street.

It previously shared an official SR designation with Interstate 99 (I-99) but was changed in 2008 to be officially SR 0699.

== Route description ==
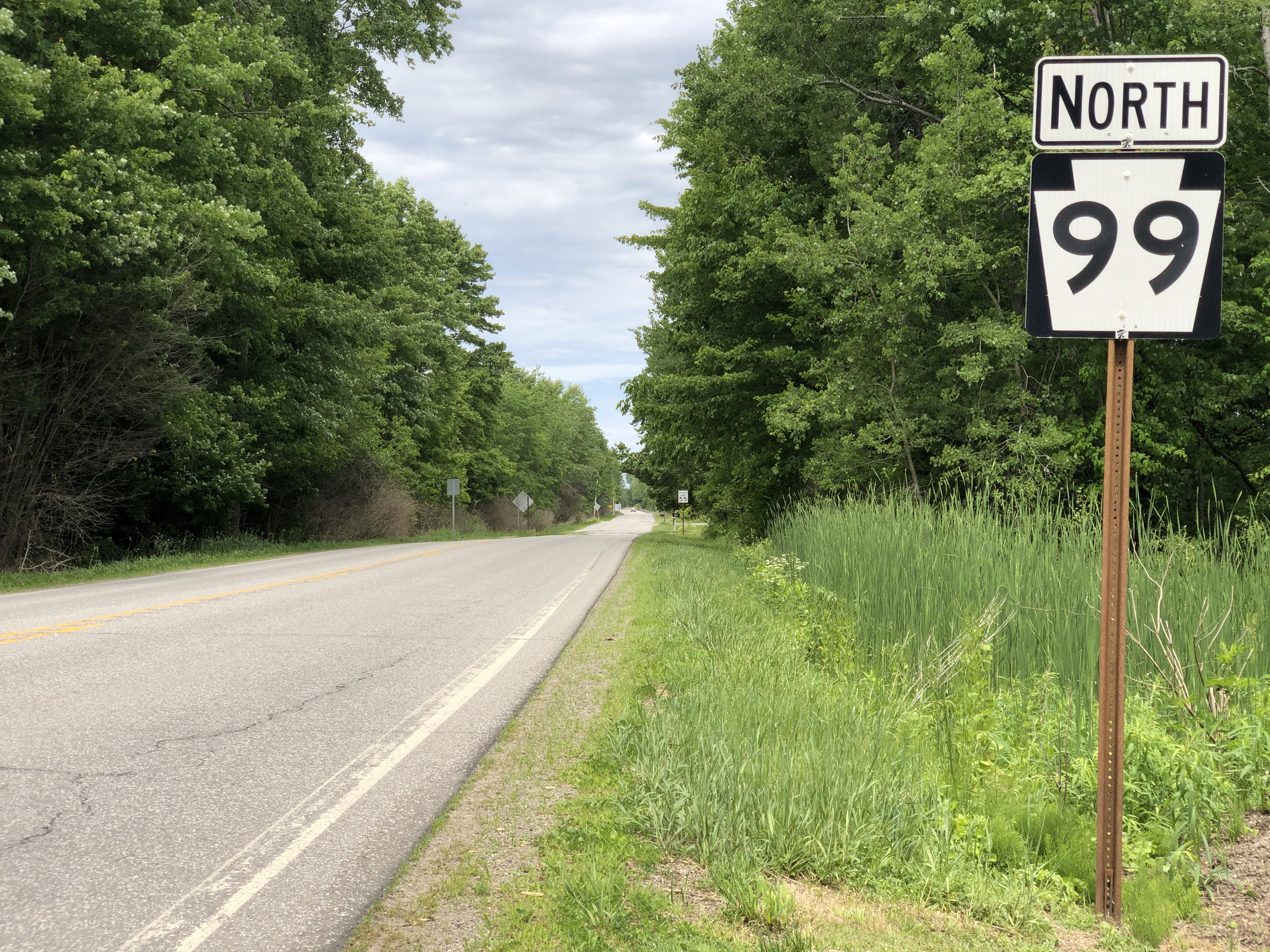
PA 99 northbound in Cambridge Township

PA 99 begins at an intersection with US 6/US 19 near the northern edge of the borough of Cambridge Springs. The route heads northwest, crossing Little Conneauttee Creek and Conneauttee Creek at Drakes Mills midway between Cambridge Springs and the Crawford-Erie county line. Just south of the county line the route crosses Torry Run, a tributary of Conneauttee Creek, twice. North of the county line, PA 99 crosses the creek once more and follows the waterway into the borough of Edinboro. Within the borough, PA 99 passes by Pennsylvania Western University - Edinboro south of an intersection with U.S. Route 6N in the center of the borough. The route continues northward, following the eastern edge of Edinboro Lake for a short distance.

Near McKean, PA 99 begins to parallel Interstate 79 as both roadways approach the city of Erie. Midway between McKean and Erie, PA 99 passes over Interstate 90 east of its interchange with I-79. Just south of the city limits in the Millcreek Township community of Kearsarge, PA 99 separates from I-79 and turns east at a T-intersection to access US 19, where PA 99 terminates.

== History ==
In 1928, the PA 99 number was first assigned to what is now Pennsylvania Route 5 along the shores of Lake Erie. Along its course, the highway had two spurs in the Erie Metropolitan Area: Pennsylvania Route 199 and Pennsylvania Route 299. The current alignment from Cambridge Springs to Kearsarge was signed as U.S. Route 19 from 1928-1932 and Pennsylvania Route 5 from 1932-1936, before finally becoming designated as PA 99 on its current alignment

== Major intersections ==
County	Location	mi	km	Destinations	Notes
Crawford	Cambridge Springs	0.00	0.00	US 6 / US 19 (North Main Street) – Erie, Corry, Meadville	Southern terminus
Erie	Edinboro	6.88	11.07	US 6N (Plum Street) to I-79	
Erie	Millcreek Township	21.04	33.86	US 19 (Peach Street) to I-90	Northern terminus
1.000 mi = 1.609 km; 1.000 km = 0.621 mi
