= Darrows Creek =

Stream in Pennsylvania, USA

Darrows Creek Tributary to Conneauttee Creek
- Location of Darrows Creek mouth Darrows Creek (the United States)

Location
- Country: United States
- State: Pennsylvania
- County: Erie
- Borough: Edinboro

Physical characteristics
- Source: Conneauttee Creek divide
  - location: about 0.5 miles east of Edinboro, Pennsylvania
  - coordinates: 41°54′20″N 080°07′12″W
  - elevation: 1,430 ft (440 m)
- Mouth: Conneauttee Creek
  - location: Edinboro, Pennsylvania
  - coordinates: 41°51′26″N 080°07′15″W
  - elevation: 1,178 ft (359 m)
- Length: 4.80 mi (7.72 km)
- Basin size: 3.68 square miles (9.5 km^{2})
- Discharge
  - location: Conneauttee Creek
  - average: 6.85 cu ft/s (0.194 m^{3}/s) at mouth with Conneauttee Creek

Basin features
- Progression: north then south
- River system: Allegheny River
- Tributaries
  - left: unnamed tributaries
  - right: unnamed tributaries
- Bridges: Hamilton Road, Shellhamer Drive, US 6N, Scot Road, Scotland Road, Darrow Road, Kinter Hill Road

Darrows Creek is a 4.80 mi (7.72 km) long 3rd order tributary to Conneauttee Creek in Erie County, Pennsylvania. This is the only stream of this name in the United States.

== Course ==
Darrows Creek rises about 0.5 miles east of Edinboro, Pennsylvania, and then flows north and then makes a curve to the south to join Conneauttee creek just south of Edinboro.

== Watershed ==
Darrows Creek drains 3.68 square miles (9.5 km^{2}) of area, receives about 45.1 in/year of precipitation, has a wetness index of 456.55, and is about 47% forested.

== See also ==
- List of rivers of Pennsylvania
