= Amos Kelly House =

Historic house in Pennsylvania, United States

- U.S. National Register of Historic Places
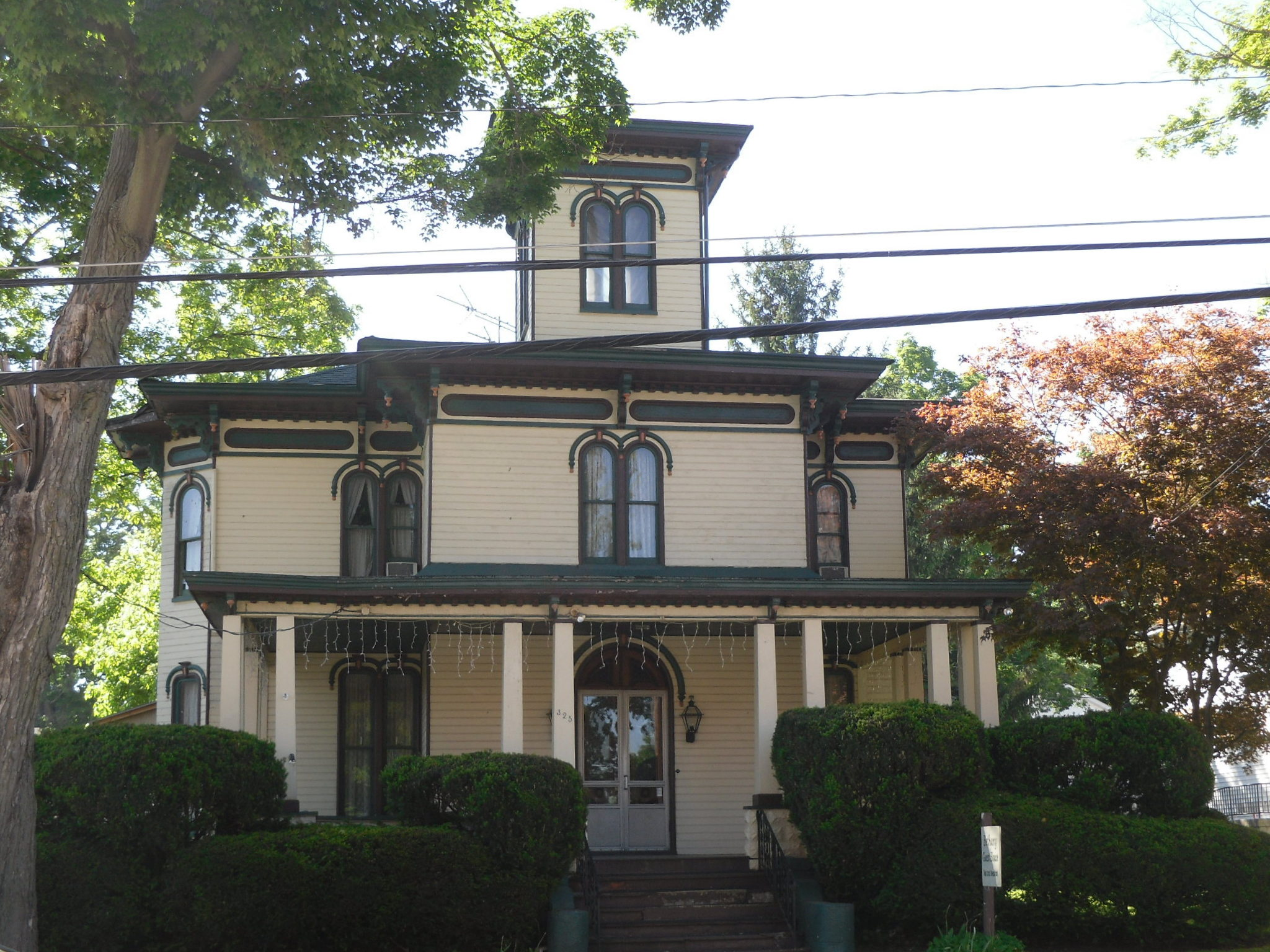
- Amos Kelly House, May 2010

- Location within Pennsylvania Location within the United States
- Location: 325 S. Main St., Cambridge Springs, Pennsylvania
- Coordinates: 41°48′6″N 80°3′32″W
- Area: 0.5 acres (0.20 ha)
- Built: 1873-1876
- Built by: Kelly, Amos
- Architectural style: Italianate
- NRHP reference No.: 80003477
- Added to NRHP: July 23, 1980

Amos Kelly House is a historic home located at Cambridge Springs, Crawford County, Pennsylvania. It was built between 1873 and 1876 and is a large two-story rectangular frame dwelling in the Italianate style. It measures approximately 95 feet by 60 feet. The front facade features a large front porch, overhanging eaves, and a square cupola.

It was added to the National Register of Historic Places in 1980.

== Gallery ==
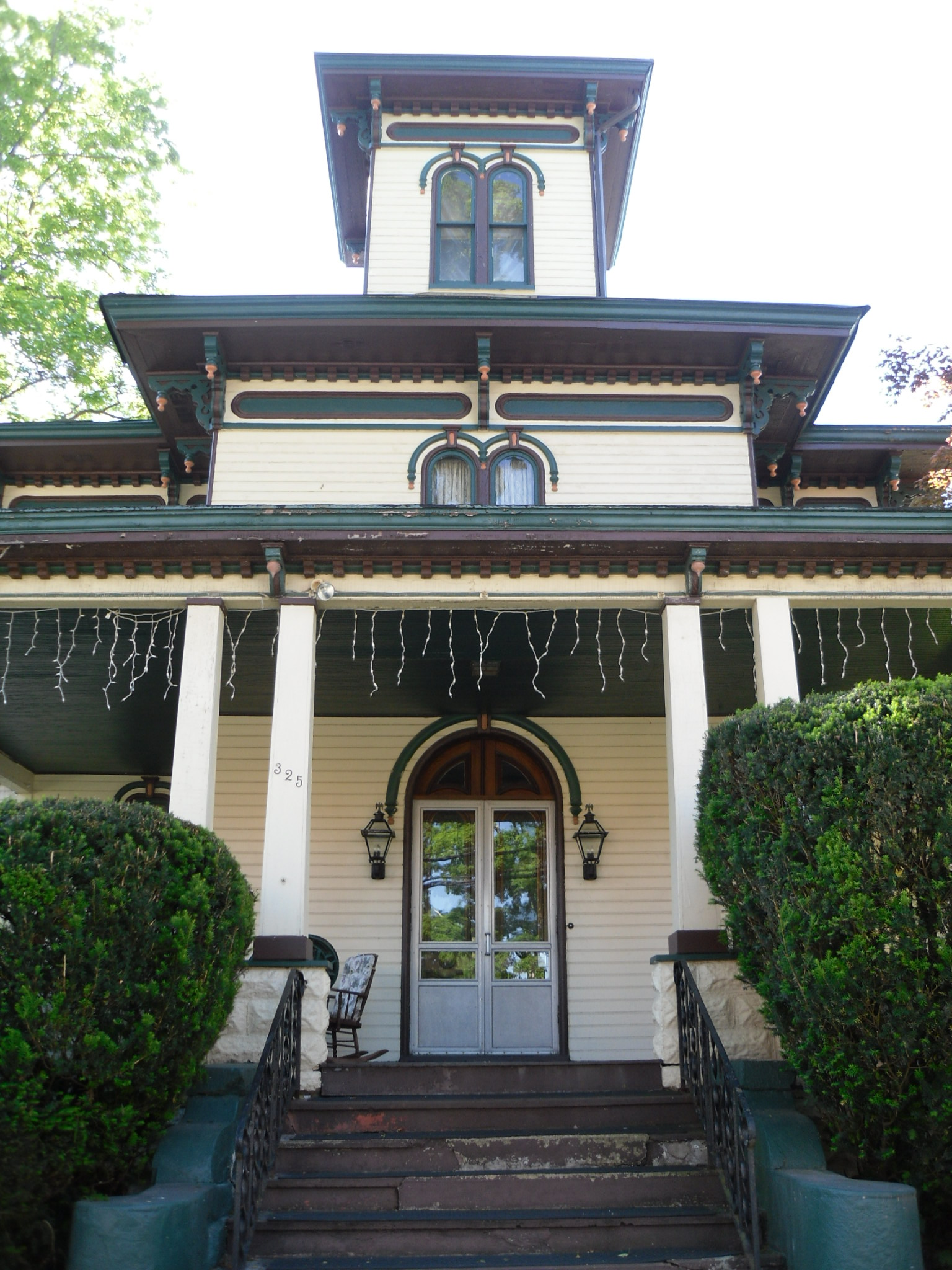
Amos Kelly House closeup, May 2010
