= Riverside Inn (Cambridge Springs, Pennsylvania) =

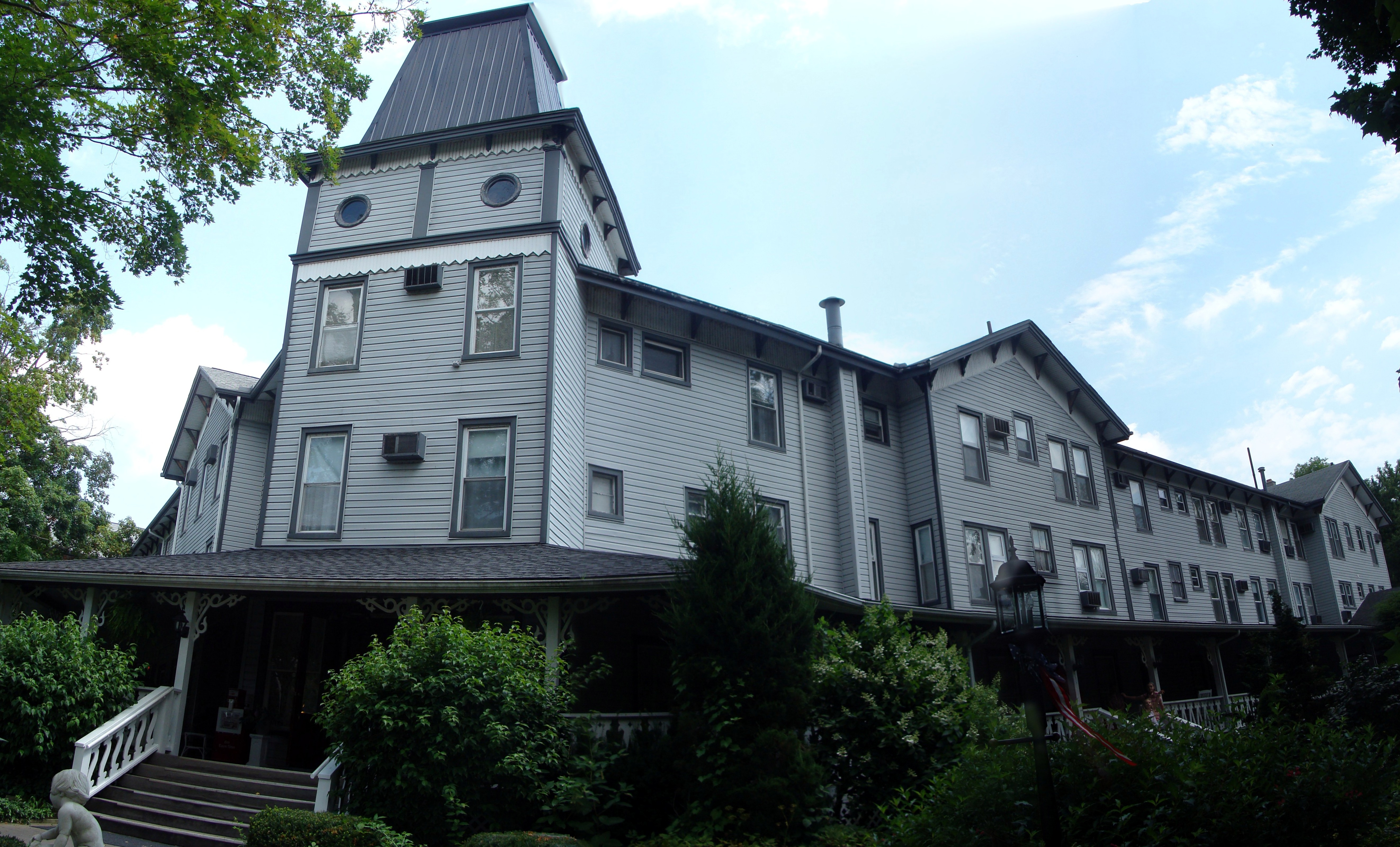

- Location within Pennsylvania Location within the United States

General information
- Architectural style: Second Empire, Shingle style
- Location: 1 Fountain Street; Cambridge Springs, Pennsylvania, United States
- Coordinates: 41°48′20.7″N 80°3′12″W
- Construction started: 1884
- Opening: July 1, 1888
- Destroyed: May 2, 2017

Technical details
- Floor count: 3
- Grounds: 7.5 acres (3.0 ha)

Other information
- Number of rooms: 74

Website

U.S. National Register of Historic Places
- Official name: Riverside Hotel
- Designated: December 13, 1978
- Reference no.: 78002380

The Riverside Inn was a hotel and dinner theater in Cambridge Springs, Crawford County in the U.S. state of Pennsylvania. Built in the late-1880s at the height of the mineral springs craze in the United States, it was operated as a resort for vacationers heading to the nearby springs that gave Cambridge Springs its name. The Riverside Inn was the first of many resorts to be built during that period. It was listed on the National Register of Historic Places in 1978. The Riverside Inn was destroyed by fire in the early morning of May 2, 2017.

== Design ==
The Riverside Inn was a wooden, three-story hotel on the banks of French Creek in Cambridge Springs, Pennsylvania. On the outside corner of the main and northwestern wings was a three-story, hipped roof tower. A 2 1/2-story, Shingle style, gabled structure called the Casino was originally built as a separate building southeast of the hotel, but was later connected to it. A 2,000-foot (600 m) boardwalk connected the hotel to the mineral springs. The only part of the boardwalk that remains are the concrete piers. A three-story, frame water tower with a hipped roof and hooded windows is located on the property.

== History ==
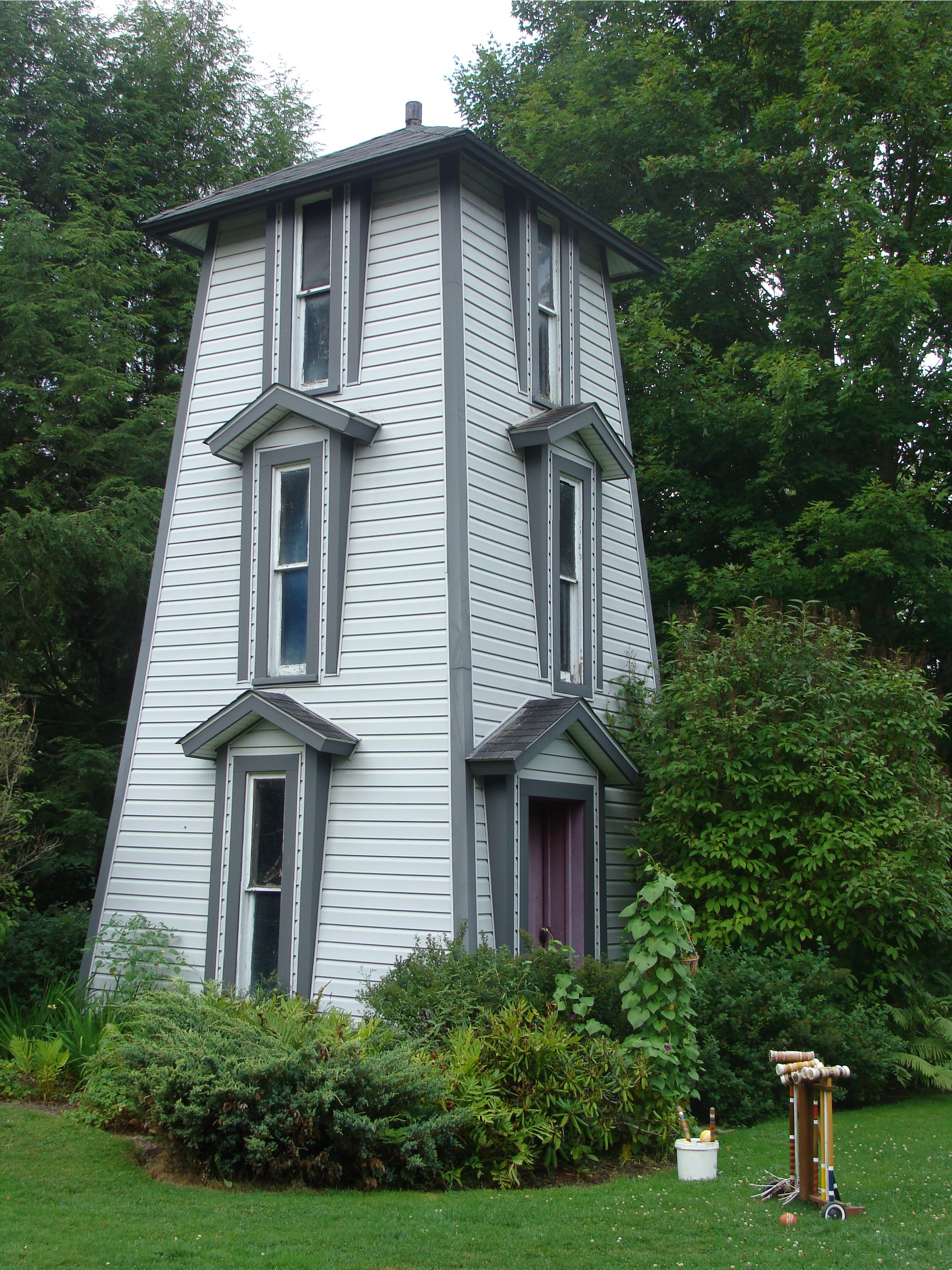
Water tower at the inn

In 1859, John H. Gray discovered a spring while searching for petroleum in the village of Cambridge, Pennsylvania. The village was incorporated into the borough of Cambridgeboro in 1866. Gray examined the water found in Hot Springs, Arkansas in 1884 and concluded that the water of his spring also had medicinal properties. Gray formed the Gray's Mineral Fountain Company in August 1884 and financed the construction of a sanitorium. The opening of the Riverside Hotel was postponed to July 1, 1888 by construction delays, but was the first built in Crawford County. Disputes between partners of in the company forced the hotel into receivership. In 1895, the Riverside was sold to William Baird. Baird also purchased Gray's mineral spring for $60,000. Cambridgeboro was renamed Cambridge Springs in 1897 to reflect the status of the borough as a spa town. Baird built a boardwalk from the hotel to the spring in 1899. Baird's son William Baird, Jr. took over management of the Riverside Hotel in 1910. A golf course was added in 1913, and was expanded to have 18-holes in 1923.

The American Medical Association came to the decision in its medical journal in 1908 that "mineral waters possess no mysterious or occult virtues in the treatment of disease." The organization put pressure onto many of the mineral spring resorts, through the Pure Food and Drug Act passed by Congress in 1906, forcing most to close by the 1920s. The Riverside stopped promoting the alleged health benefits of the springs, but was still noted for its other amenities such as the golf course.

When the Rider Hotel burnt down in 1935, The Riverside Inn was the only remaining hotel left from that era in the town's history. In 1946, Colonel Frank W. Parke bought the entire Riverside Establishment from the Baird family. He sold it in 1965.

In 1988, the U.S. Chess Championship took place in Cambridge Springs at the Riverside Inn.

In 2013, the Riverside Inn was featured in the Travel Channel television series The Dead Files which investigated alleged paranormal activity at the inn.

== Destroyed by fire ==
On May 2, 2017, a fire broke out in the kitchen early in the morning, and spread rapidly throughout the rest of the structure. By daybreak, the entire complex was destroyed. Firefighters from 20 departments and two counties were called to the scene, for the wooden building had no modern fire breaks, and multiple ballrooms made the blaze difficult to fight.

== See also ==
- National Register of Historic Places listings in Crawford County, Pennsylvania
- Cambridge Springs (Erie Railroad station)
- List of dinner theaters

== Sources ==
- Bates, Samuel P (1899). Our County and Its People: A Historical and Memorial of Crawford County, Pennsylvania. Boston: W. A. Fergusson and Co.
- Davis, John P (March 1978). "Riverside Hotel". National Register of Historic Places Inventory—Nomination Form. National Archives and Records Administration.
- Perich, Terry; Perich, Kathleen (2006). Cambridge Springs and Edinboro. Postcard History. Charleston, South Carolina: Arcadia Publishing. ISBN 0-7385-4528-7.
