= Cambridge Springs Bridge =

- U.S. National Register of Historic Places
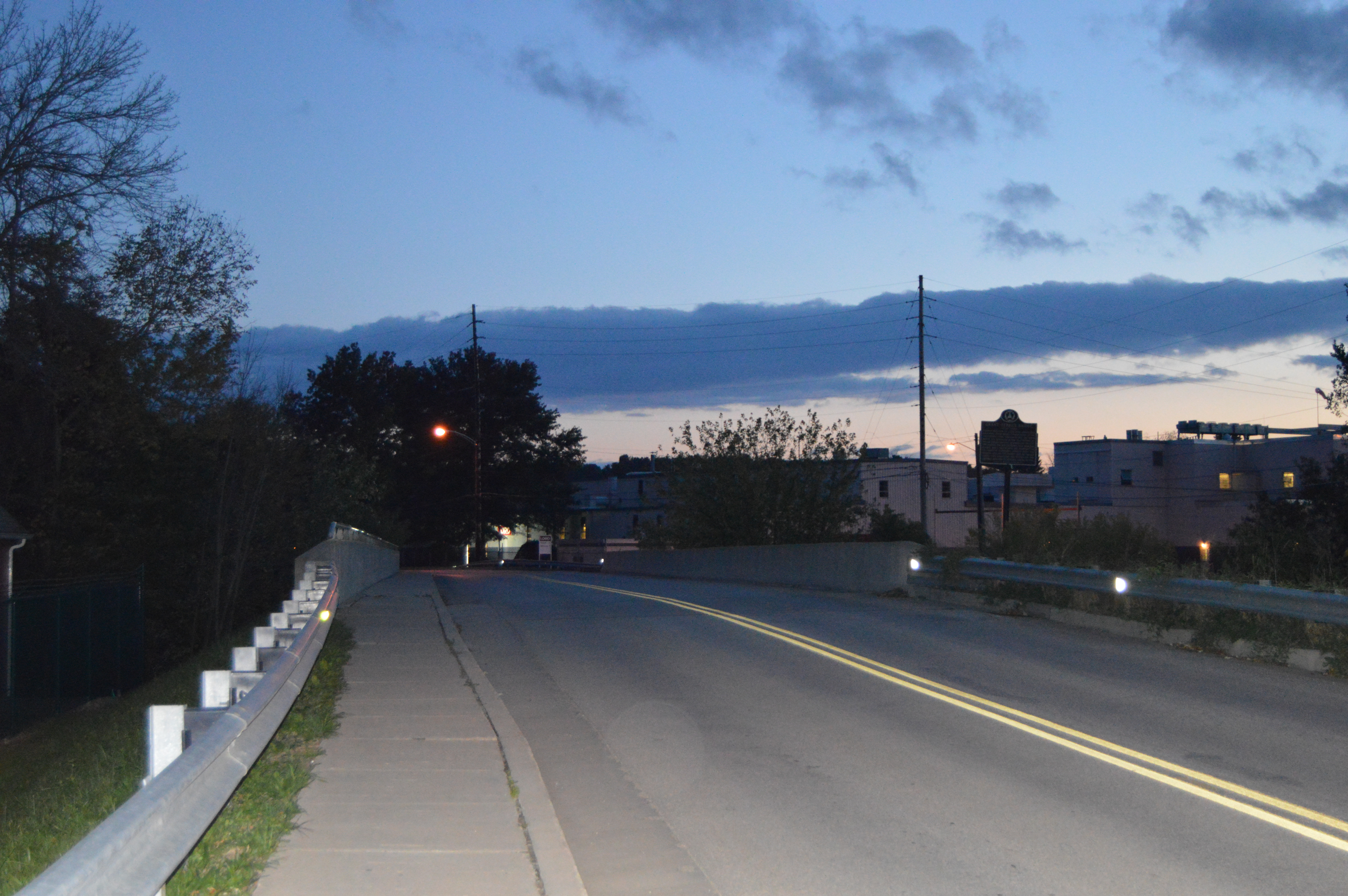
- Concrete girder bridge that has replaced the historic truss bridge

- Location within Pennsylvania Location within the United States
- Location: LR 84 spur B over French Creek, Cambridge Springs, Pennsylvania
- Coordinates: 41°48′23″N 80°3′41″W
- Area: less than one acre
- Built: 1896
- Built by: Youngstown Bridge Co.
- Architectural style: Baltimore truss
- MPS: Highway Bridges Owned by the Commonwealth of Pennsylvania, Department of Transportation TR
- NRHP reference No.: 88000824
- Added to NRHP: June 22, 1988

Cambridge Springs Bridge was a historic metal truss bridge spanning French Creek at Cambridge Springs, Crawford County, Pennsylvania. It was built in 1896, and was a single span, Baltimore truss bridge measuring 200-foot-long (61 m). It was built by the Youngstown Bridge Company of Youngstown, Ohio. It was demolished about 2003.

It was added to the National Register of Historic Places in 1988.
