= Cambridge Springs, Pennsylvania =

Borough in Pennsylvania, US

- Home rule municipality
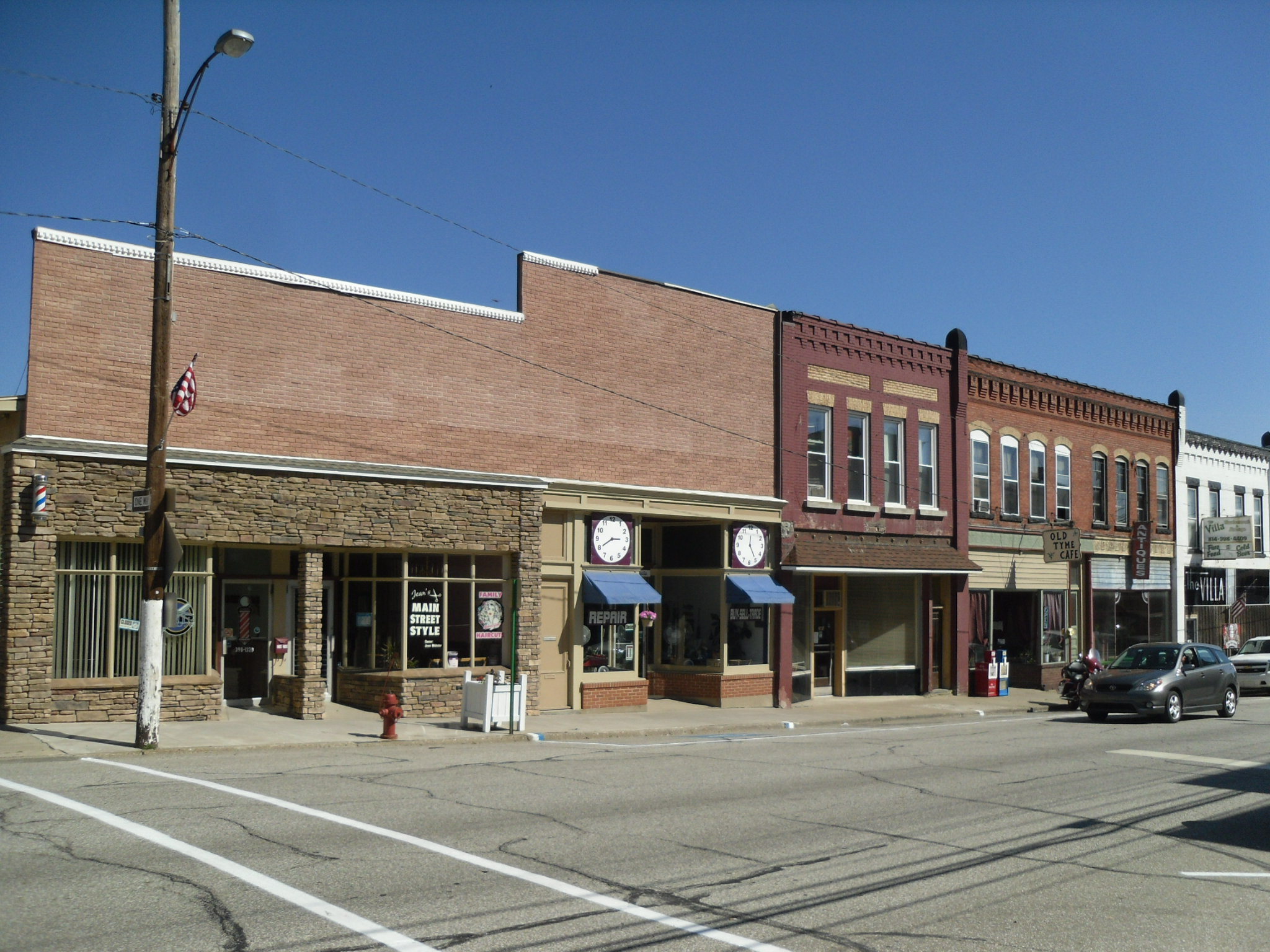
- Downtown Cambridge Springs

- Seal
- Etymology: Cambridge, Massachusetts and nearby mineral springs
- Location of Cambridge Springs in Crawford County, Pennsylvania

- Location of Cambridge Springs in Pennsylvania
- Coordinates: 41°48′8″N 80°3′33″W
- Country: United States
- State: Pennsylvania
- County: Crawford
- Settled: 1822

Government
  - Mayor: Delores Hale

Area
  - Total: 0.89 sq mi (2.30 km^{2})
  - Land: 0.89 sq mi (2.30 km^{2})
  - Water: 0 sq mi (0.00 km^{2})
- Highest elevation (at water tank in southwest corner of borough): 1,300 ft (400 m)
- Lowest elevation (French Creek at borough line): 1,130 ft (340 m)

Population (2020)
  - Total: 2,583
  - Estimate (2022): 2,339
  - Density: 2,915.7/sq mi (1,125.77/km^{2})
- Time zone: UTC-5 (EST)
  - Summer (DST): UTC-4 (EDT)
- ZIP Code: 16403
- Area code: 814
- FIPS code: 42-10912
- Website: https://cambridgespringsborough.com/

Cambridge Springs is a borough with home rule status in Crawford County, Pennsylvania, United States. The population was 2,583 at the 2020 census, down from 2,595 at the 2010 census.

== History ==
The village of Cambridge was settled in 1822 and named for the town of Cambridge, Massachusetts. It was incorporated into the borough of Cambridgeboro on April 3, 1866.

In the late 19th century, Cambridgeboro was known for its mineral springs. The discovery of the springs eventually led to the borough being renamed to Cambridge Springs on April 1, 1897. It was a resort town featuring a variety of hotels including the Rider Hotel, which burned down in 1931. The last of these hotels, the Riverside Inn, burned down on May 2, 2017, and had been listed in the National Register of Historic Places since 1978. Also listed on the National Register of Historic Places are the Cambridge Springs Bridge and Amos Kelly House.

In 1904, the Rider Hotel in Cambridge Springs was the site of a famous chess tournament won by Frank Marshall ahead of World Champion Emanuel Lasker and fourteen other players. A variation of the Queen's Gambit Declined opening played several times there is today known as the Cambridge Springs Defense (1.d4 d5 2.c4 e6 3.Nc3 Nf6 4.Bg5 Nbd7 5.e3 c6 6.Nf3 Qa5 in algebraic notation).

From 1912 to 1987, it was home to Alliance College. In 1912, United States President William Howard Taft traveled to Cambridge Springs for the dedication. The site of the college is now occupied by the State Correctional Institution – Cambridge Springs, a minimum-security prison.

In the early 20th century, the town became a "veritable 'Mecca' to chronic hoboes" who were interested in meeting Leon Ray Livingston, the famed hobo and author who had established Cambridge Springs as his home base while not traveling.

The borough adopted a home rule charter on May 21, 1974, that took effect on January 5, 1976. While the community's official name remains the "Borough of Cambridge Springs", it is no longer subject to the Pennsylvania Borough Code.

== Geography ==
Cambridge Springs is located in north-central Crawford County at 41°48′8″N 80°3′33″W (41.802324, -80.059174). It is surrounded by Cambridge Township, a separate municipality.

U.S. routes 19 and 6 pass together through Cambridge Springs, leading north 7 miles (11 km) to their split near Mill Village and south 12 miles (19 km) to Meadville, the Crawford County seat. Erie is 25 miles (40 km) north of Cambridge Springs via US 19. Pennsylvania Route 99 leads northwest from Cambridge Springs 7 miles (11 km) to Edinboro, PA 86 leads south 4 miles (6 km) to Woodcock, and PA 408 leads southeast 27 miles (43 km) to Titusville.

According to the United States Census Bureau, the borough has a total area of 0.872 square miles (2.26 km^{2}), all land. French Creek, a tributary of the Allegheny River, flows through the northern part of Cambridge Springs.

== Demographics ==
Historical population
| Census | Pop. | Note | %± |
|---|---|---|---|
| 1870 | 452 | | — |
| 1880 | 674 | | 49.1% |
| 1890 | 912 | | 35.3% |
| 1900 | 1,495 | | 63.9% |
| 1910 | 1,514 | | 1.3% |
| 1920 | 1,663 | | 9.8% |
| 1930 | 1,665 | | 0.1% |
| 1940 | 1,807 | | 8.5% |
| 1950 | 2,246 | | 24.3% |
| 1960 | 2,031 | | −9.6% |
| 1970 | 1,998 | | −1.6% |
| 1980 | 2,102 | | 5.2% |
| 1990 | 1,837 | | −12.6% |
| 2000 | 2,363 | | 28.6% |
| 2010 | 2,595 | | 9.8% |
| 2020 | 2,583 | | −0.5% |
| 2022 (est.) | 2,339 | ▼ | −9.4% |

As of the 2010 United States census, there were 2,595 people, 675 households, and 484 families residing in the borough. The population density was 2,975.9 inhabitants per square mile (1,149.0/km^{2}). There were 741 dwelling units at an average density of 857.8 per square mile (331.2/km^{2}). The racial makeup of the borough was 84.9 percent White, 12.8 percent African American, 0.3 percent Native American, 0.3 percent Asian, 0.9 percent from other races, and 0.7 percent from two or more races. Hispanics or Latinos of any race were 3.5 percent of the population.

There were 675 households, out of which 21.7 percent had children under the age of 18 living with them, 40.7 percent were married couples living together, 19.0 percent had a female householder with no husband present, and 48.4 percent were non-families. 33.2% of all households were made up of individuals, and 13.8% had someone living alone who was 65 years of age or older. The average household size was 2.38 and the average family size was 3.04.

The age distribution was 19.0% under 18, 8.8% from 18 to 24, 40.9% from 25 to 44, 18.2% from 45 to 64, and 13.2% who were 65 or older. The median age was 36 years. For every 100 females, there were 54.8 males. For every 100 females age 18 and over, there were 46.4 males.

The median income for a household in the borough was $31,957, and the median income for a family was $39,196. Males had a median income of $31,146 versus $22,350 for females. The per capita income for the borough was $12,863. About 8.7% of families and 12.2% of the population were below the poverty line, including 16.1% of those under age 18 and 12.0% of those age 65 or over.

== See also ==
- Cambridge Springs (Erie Railroad station)
- Cambridge Springs, Pennsylvania Comprehensive Plan

== Sources ==
- Bates, Samuel P (1899). Our County and Its People: A Historical and Memorial of Crawford County, Pennsylvania. Boston: W. A. Fergusson and Company.
