= U.S. Route 6N =

Auxiliary route in Pennsylvania, United States

U.S. Route 6N
- US 6N highlighted in red

Route information
- Maintained by PennDOT
- Length: 27.888 mi (44.881 km)
- Existed: 1935 (present alignment)–present

Major junctions
- West end: US 20 in West Springfield
- I-90 in West Springfield; I-79 near Edinboro
- East end: US 6 / US 19 in Mill Village

Location
- Country: United States
- State: Pennsylvania
- Counties: Erie

Highway system
- United States Numbered Highway System; List; Special; Divided; Pennsylvania State Route System; Interstate; US; State; Scenic; Legislative
← PA 6	→ PA 7

U.S. Route 6N (US 6N) is a 28-mile-long (45 km) auxiliary route of US 6 that is located in Erie County, Pennsylvania in the United States. The western terminus is situated at US 20 in West Springfield, one-half mile (0.80 km) north of Interstate 90 (I-90) exit 3. Its eastern terminus is located at US 6 and US 19, west of Mill Village.

The highway was officially designated as State Route 3006 (SR 3006) by the Pennsylvania Department of Transportation (PennDOT), except along its concurrency with Pennsylvania Route 18 (PA 18), where it is part of SR 0018.

== Route description ==
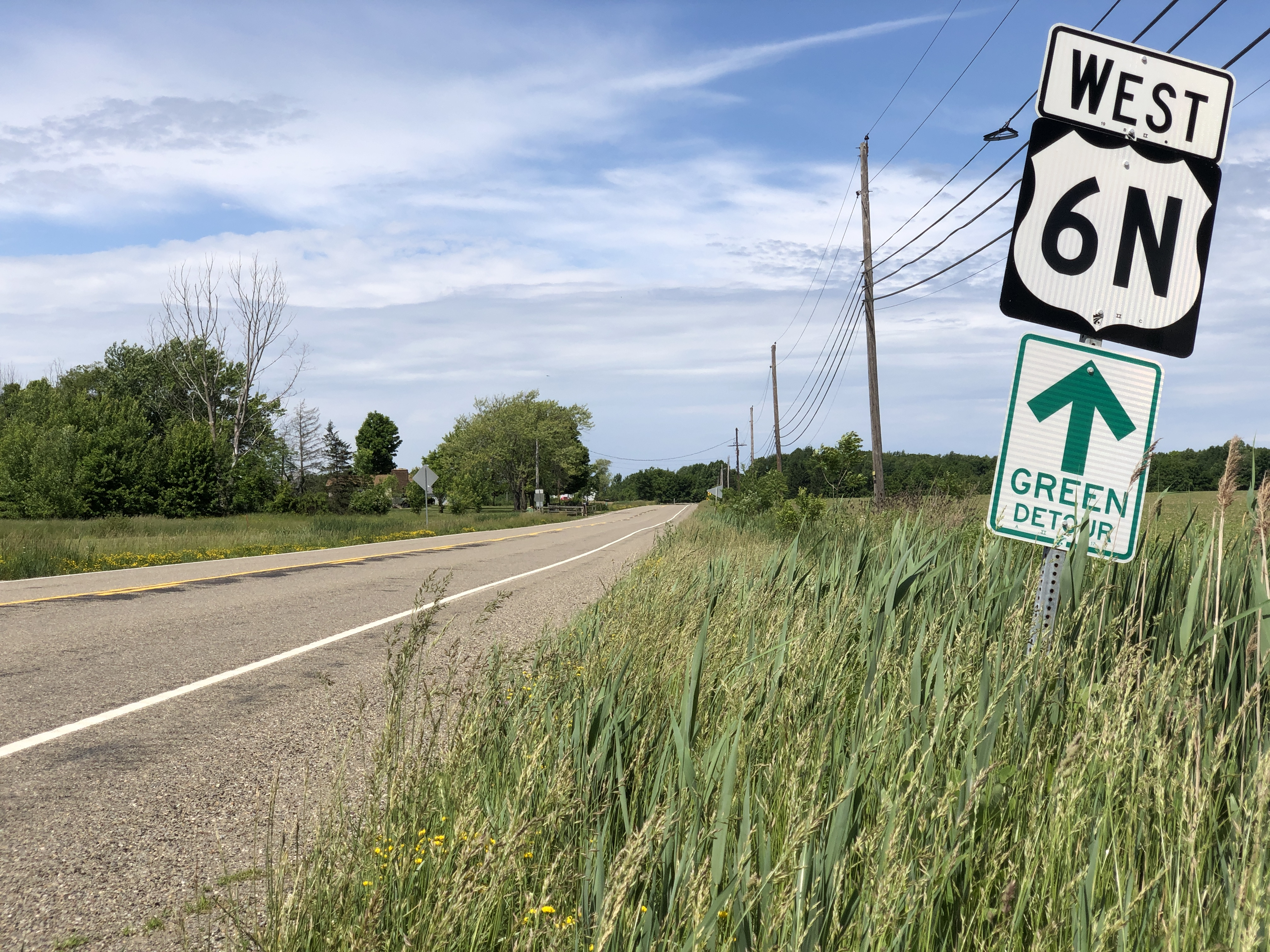
US 6N westbound past PA 215 in Conneaut Township

US 6N begins at an intersection with US 20 in Springfield Township, heading southeast on a four-lane divided highway. The road heads through wooded areas and reaches an interchange with I-90. From here, US 6N continues south, narrowing to a two-lane undivided road and crossing under the Canadian National Railway's Bessemer Subdivision railroad line before running through forested areas with some fields and homes. The road crosses the Conneaut Creek into Conneaut Township and passes through Cherry Hill, continuing south through a mix of farmland and woodland with a few residences. The route curves southeast and intersects PA 226, at which point it turns east. US 6N passes through more rural areas as it comes to a junction with the southern terminus of PA 215. The road continues east into the borough of Albion, where it becomes West State Street and passes homes. The route intersects PA 18, at which point that route turns east for a concurrency with US 6N on East State Street, passing through the commercial downtown and crossing the Bessemer Subdivision. The road passes through more residential areas, briefly crossing back into Conneaut Township before coming into Elk Creek Township and becoming an unnamed road that runs through rural areas. PA 18 splits from US 6N in Wellsburg by heading to the north, and US 6N continues east through areas of farms and woods with some homes. In the community of Lavery, the route crosses PA 98.

Farther east, the road crosses into Washington Township and comes to an interchange with I-79, at which point the road is a four-lane divided highway that runs near businesses. Past this interchange, US 6N becomes a two-lane undivided road again passes through more rural surroundings before heading into more residential areas and entering the borough of Edinboro. Here, the name of the road becomes West Plum Street and it turns southeast past more homes. The route turns east into the commercial downtown, gaining a center left-turn lane, and intersects PA 99. Past this junction, the road name becomes East Plum Street and it becomes a two-lane road that passes more businesses. US 6N turns east-northeast onto Waterford Street and runs through more residential areas with PennWest Edinboro to the south. The route continues back into Washington Township and curves northeast through agricultural areas with some residential and commercial development. The road heads east and passes through more farmland with occasional woods and homes. The route crosses into LeBoeuf Township and runs through more forested areas with some fields and residences. US 6N turns southeast and comes to an intersection with US 6 and US 19, where the route ends and the road continues east as part of US 6.

== History ==
From 1931 to 1935, US 6N occupied a different alignment through Erie County, occupying present-day PA 97 from PA 8 in downtown Erie to PA 8 in Union City. In an overlapping period starting earlier, from 1928 to 1933, another US 6N followed what is now US 209 between Kingston and Port Jervis, New York.

== Major intersections ==
The entire route is in Erie County.

Location	mi	km	Destinations	Notes
Springfield Township	0.000– 0.034	0.000– 0.055	US 20 (West Ridge Road) – Conneaut, Erie	Western terminus
Springfield Township	0.434– 0.616	0.698– 0.991	I-90 – Cleveland, Erie	I-90 exit 3; diamond interchange
Conneaut Township	4.581	7.372	PA 226 west	Eastern terminus of PA 226
Conneaut Township	5.946	9.569	PA 215 north (Kidders Corner Road) / SR 3011 (Knapp Road) – East Springfield	Southern terminus of PA 215
Albion	8.140	13.100	PA 18 south / SR 3013 (Main Street)	Western end of PA 18 concurrency
Elk Creek Township	9.477	15.252	PA 18 north (Meadville Road) – Girard	Eastern end of PA 18 concurrency
Elk Creek Township	15.123	24.338	PA 98 – Fairview, Meadville	
Washington Township	18.167– 18.345	29.237– 29.523	I-79 – Pittsburgh, Erie	I-79 exit 166; diamond interchange
Edinboro	20.664	33.255	PA 99 (Erie Street) – Edinboro University	
LeBoeuf Township	27.888	44.881	US 6 / US 19 (Grand Army of the Republic Highway) – Erie, Meadville, Corry	Eastern terminus
1.000 mi = 1.609 km; 1.000 km = 0.621 mi: Concurrency terminus
