= Edinboro Lake =

245-acre lake located in Erie County, Pennsylvania, United States

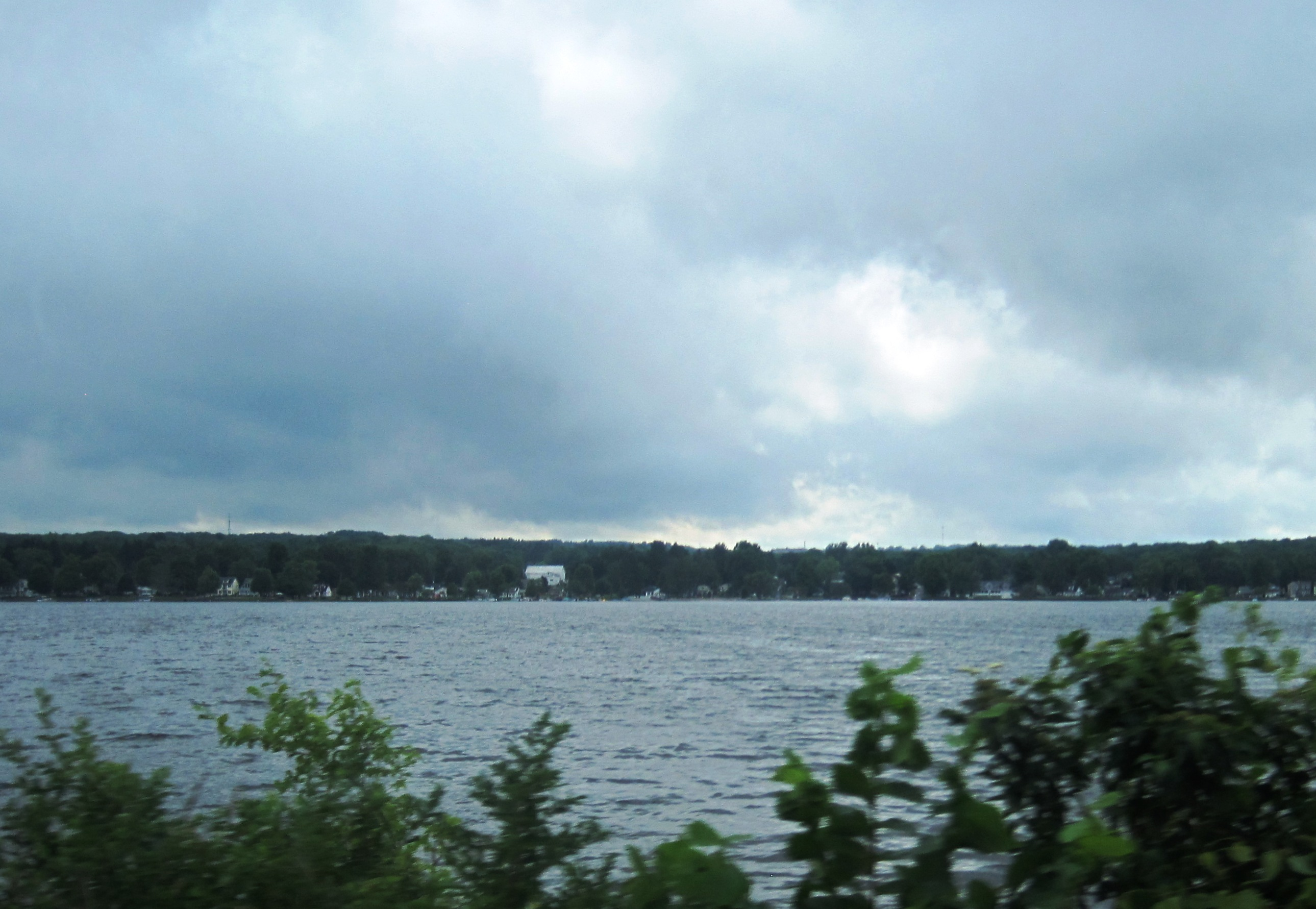
- Lake from PA 99

- Location within Pennsylvania Location within the United States
- Location: Edinboro, Pennsylvania
- Coordinates: 41°53′05″N 80°8′10″W
- Lake type: Glacial
- Primary inflows: Shenango Creek, Whipple Creek, Lakeside Run (local name)
- Primary outflows: Conneautee Creek
- Basin countries: United States
- Managing agency: Edinboro Township
- Built: Formed approximately 19,000 years ago
- Surface area: 245 acres (99 ha)
- Average depth: 11 ft (3.4 m)
- Max. depth: 30 ft (9.1 m)
- Water volume: 4,500 acre-feet (5.6×10^{6} m^{3})
- Residence time: 5.1 years
- Surface elevation: 1,197 ft (365 m) above sea level
- Frozen: Late October Early November–March yearly
- Islands: 4
- Settlements: Edinboro, Pennsylvania

Edinboro Lake is a 245 acres (99 ha) lake which is located in Erie County, Pennsylvania, United States. It is surrounded on three sides by the town of Edinboro and the State Route 99 runs along the shore for a short stretch.

== Description ==
The lake has two established beach areas, as well as a public park which provide public access to the lake. The lake's primary output is Conneauttee Creek which in turn flows into French Creek. The lake's outflow is controlled by a small dam.

The current lake level is approximately eight feet higher than the natural lake's level. The historical lake level is marked by numerous stump lines at the historical shoreline.

Edinboro Lake supports a diverse fishery. The lake is targeted by fishermen seeking largemouth bass, smallmouth bass, crappie, bluegill, sunfish, and muskellunge.

It is included in the Pennsylvavia Fish and Boat Commission's Brood Stock Lake program for musky production. When Surveyed in 2008 the commission (Pennsylvania Fish and Boat Commission) netted a significant number of muskies. Most of the fish were in the 30 to 34 inches (760 to 860 mm) range with the largest being 40 inches (1,000 mm).
