= Little Conneauttee Creek =

Stream in Pennsylvania, USA

Little Conneauttee Creek Tributary to Conneauttee Creek
- Location of Little Conneauttee Creek mouth Little Conneauttee Creek (the United States)

Location
- Country: United States
- State: Pennsylvania
- County: Crawford; Erie

Physical characteristics
- Source: Trout Run divide
  - location: about 2 miles southeast of Reeds Corners, Pennsylvania
  - coordinates: 41°57′39″N 080°05′12″W
  - elevation: 1,490 ft (450 m)
- Mouth: Conneauttee Creek
  - location: about 1 mile south of Drakes Mills, Pennsylvania
  - coordinates: 41°48′45″N 080°04′31″W
  - elevation: 1,130 ft (340 m)
- Length: 14.27 mi (22.97 km)
- Basin size: 25.64 square miles (66.4 km^{2})
- Discharge
  - location: Conneauttee Creek
  - average: 45.83 cu ft/s (1.298 m^{3}/s) at mouth with Conneauttee Creek

Basin features
- Progression: generally south
- River system: Allegheny River
- Tributaries
  - left: unnamed tributaries
  - right: unnamed tributaries
- Bridges: E Stancliff Road, McLaughlin Road, Old State Road, Draketown Road, Leacock Road, Crane Road, Old Route 86, US 6N, Conneauttee Road, Kinter Hill Road, Kreitz Road, PA 99

Little Conneauttee Creek is a 14.27 mi (22.97 km) long 3rd order tributary to Conneauttee Creek in Crawford County, Pennsylvania and Erie County, Pennsylvania. This is the only stream of this name in the United States.

== Variant names ==
According to the Geographic Names Information System, it has also been known historically as:

- Little Conneautte Creek

== Course ==
Little Conneautee Creek rises about 2 miles southeast of Reeds Corners, Pennsylvania, and then flows generally south to join Conneauttee creek about 1 mile south of Drakes Mills.

== Watershed ==
Little Conneauttee Creek drains 25.64 square miles (66.4 km^{2}) of area, receives about 45.4 in/year of precipitation, has a wetness index of 445.07, and is about 45% forested.

== See also ==
- List of rivers of Pennsylvania
