= Edinboro, Pennsylvania =

Borough in Pennsylvania, United States

- Home-rule borough
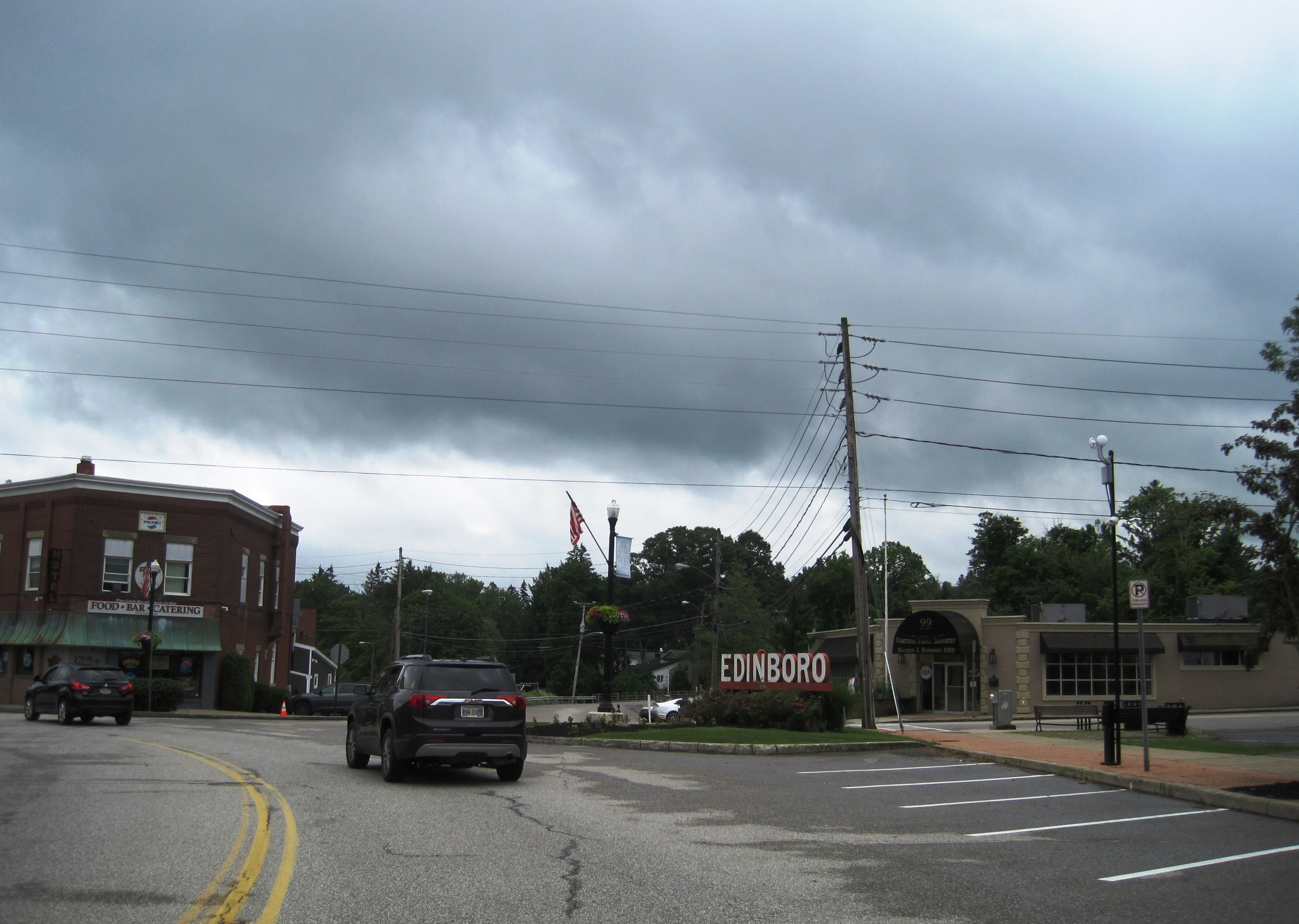
- Downtown Edinboro along Erie Street

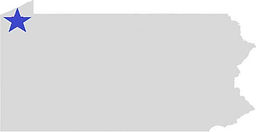
- Logo

- Location in Erie County and the U.S. state of Pennsylvania.
- Coordinates: 41°52′56″N 80°7′54″W
- Country: United States
- State: Pennsylvania
- County: Erie

Government
  - Mayor: Aaron L. Gast

Area
  - Total: 2.41 sq mi (6.23 km^{2})
  - Land: 2.29 sq mi (5.92 km^{2})
  - Water: 0.12 sq mi (0.31 km^{2})
- Elevation (center of downtown): 1,200 ft (370 m)
- Highest elevation (southeast corner of borough): 1,305 ft (398 m)
- Lowest elevation (Conneauttee Creek): 1,180 ft (360 m)

Population (2020)
  - Total: 4,964
  - Density: 2,170.2/sq mi (837.91/km^{2})
- Time zone: UTC-4 (EST)
  - Summer (DST): UTC-5 (EDT)
- ZIP code: 16412
- Area code: 814
- FIPS code: 42-22608
- Website: www.edinboro.net

Edinboro is a borough in Erie County, Pennsylvania, United States. The population was 4,920 at the 2020 census. It is a small college town, home to Pennsylvania Western University, Edinboro. It is part of the Erie metropolitan area.

== History ==
Members of the Eriez, Iroquois, and Cornplanter Native tribes were the first known inhabitants of the area that is now known as Edinboro. These nations called the region Conneauttee, meaning "land of the living snowflake". William Culbertson moved to the area in 1801, building a gristmill near Conneauttee Lake.

From 1801 to 1825, the roots of the town were formed when congregations of Presbyterian and Methodist churches began moving to the area and building houses and churches, some of which are still standing today. The first settler, William Culbertson, built the first school around 1825. The first post office was built around 1837 when it was included in the Erie and Crawford counties' postal routes. The farms helped the area grow during this time, and the area was incorporated in 1840 with a population of 232 at about 500 acres (200 ha). A turnpike between Erie and Meadville was constructed in the 1840s; it was made of wooden planks, and completed in 1852. In 1857, an academy was started, which was renamed the State Normal School in 1861, and which would eventually become Pennsylvania Western University, Edinboro.

A trolley station was built by the Erie Traction Company, which built an electric railway in the 1900s which drew more traffic to the area. Fires in 1902, 1905, and 1909, destroyed most of the wood-framed, commercial buildings, many of which were replaced with brick structures that are still standing today. Many more houses, condominiums, and apartments were constructed from 1910 through the 1950s, as Edinboro promoted itself, mainly to the surrounding populations in Pittsburgh and Erie as a resort area by the lake. This promotion boosted tourism, while the college gained enrollment and drew more residents to the town.

The 1960s was a significant growth period for the town, as around 400 building permits were issued for both housing and business. A post office was built in 1960, and evolved to first class status by 1966. The demand for water consumption had tripled throughout this period, and prompted the construction of a new sewage plant in 1970.

The borough's home rule charter was adopted in 1974, with a new municipal building being constructed in 1975. In 1980, the census placed Edinboro first in population growth in Erie County, with a population increase of 30% from 1970 to 1980 to a total of 6,324. Today, Edinboro is known as a college town in the winter and lake resort during the summer.

Academy Hall was listed on the National Register of Historic Places in 2006.

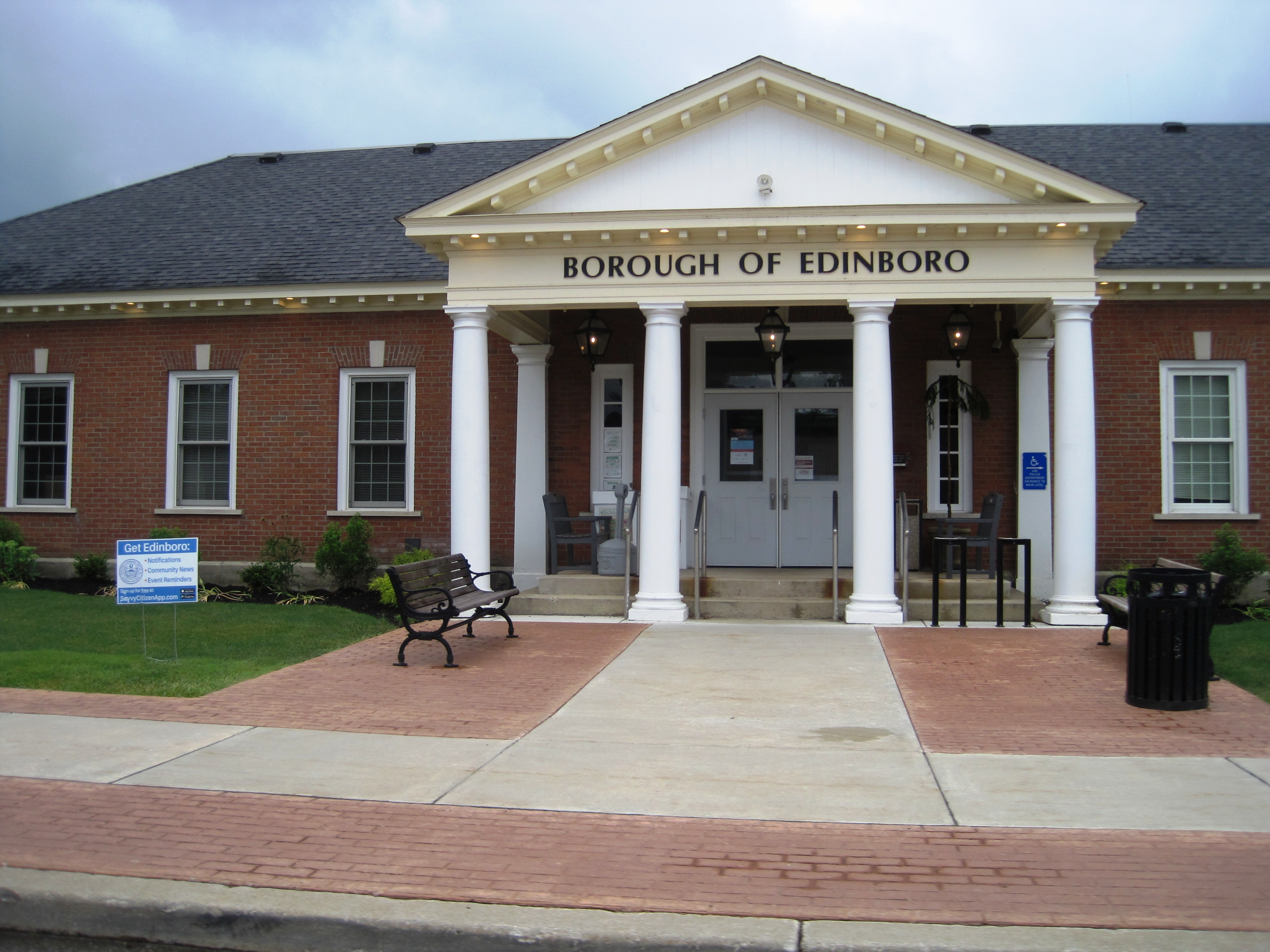
Edinboro Borough Hall

== Geography ==
Edinboro is located in southern Erie County, and is surrounded by Washington Township.

According to the United States Census Bureau, the borough has a total area of 2.4 square miles (6.2 km^{2}), of which 2.3 square miles (5.9 km^{2}) is land and 0.12 square miles (0.3 km^{2}), or 4.95%, is water. The center of the borough is at the south end of Edinboro Lake and around its outlet, Conneauttee Creek, a south-flowing tributary of French Creek and part of the Allegheny River/Ohio River/Mississippi River watershed. Darrows Creek, a tributary of Conneauttee Creek, rises east of town and flows south through the campus of the Edinboro University of Pennsylvania.

U.S. Route 6N passes through the center of Edinboro, leading east 7 miles (11 km) to U.S. Routes 6 and 19 near Mill Village, and west 2.5 miles (4.0 km) to Interstate 79. Pennsylvania Route 99 crosses US 6N in the center of Edinboro, leading north 8 miles (13 km) to McKean and southeast 7 miles (11 km) to Cambridge Springs. The city of Erie is 23 miles (37 km) north via US 6N and I-79.

== Demographics ==
Historical population
Census	Pop.	Note	%±
1850	264		—
1860	474		79.5%
1870	801		69.0%
1880	876		9.4%
1890	1,107		26.4%
1900	691		−37.6%
1910	666		−3.6%
1920	835		25.4%
1930	789		−5.5%
1940	804		1.9%
1950	1,567		94.9%
1960	1,703		8.7%
1970	4,871		186.0%
1980	6,324		29.8%
1990	7,736		22.3%
2000	6,950		−10.2%
2010	6,438		−7.4%
2020	4,964		−22.9%
2021 (est.)	4,889	▼	−1.5%

=== 2020 census ===
As of the 2020 census, Edinboro had a population of 4,964. The median age was 23.8 years. 15.3% of residents were under the age of 18 and 13.3% of residents were 65 years of age or older. For every 100 females there were 83.9 males, and for every 100 females age 18 and over there were 80.7 males age 18 and over.

99.4% of residents lived in urban areas, while 0.6% lived in rural areas.

There were 1,727 households in Edinboro, of which 24.1% had children under the age of 18 living in them. Of all households, 33.5% were married-couple households, 23.1% were households with a male householder and no spouse or partner present, and 35.0% were households with a female householder and no spouse or partner present. About 37.9% of all households were made up of individuals and 10.6% had someone living alone who was 65 years of age or older.

There were 2,267 housing units, of which 23.8% were vacant. The homeowner vacancy rate was 1.4% and the rental vacancy rate was 24.6%.

Racial composition as of the 2020 census
Race	Number	Percent
White	4,350	87.6%
Black or African American	249	5.0%
American Indian and Alaska Native	12	0.2%
Asian	40	0.8%
Native Hawaiian and Other Pacific Islander	0	0.0%
Some other race	50	1.0%
Two or more races	263	5.3%
Hispanic or Latino (of any race)	168	3.4%

=== 2000 census ===
As of the census of 2000, there were 6,950 people, 2,087 households, and 830 families residing in the borough. The population density was 3,000.6 inhabitants per square mile (1,158.5/km^{2}). There were 2,242 housing units at an average density of 968.0 per square mile (373.7/km^{2}). The racial makeup of the borough was 92.29% White, 4.45% African American, 0.16% Native American, 1.61% Asian, 0.03% Pacific Islander, 0.52% from other races, and 0.95% from two or more races. Hispanic or Latino of any race were 0.99% of the population.

There were 2,087 households, out of which 19.3% had children under the age of 18 living with them, 29.9% were married couples living together, 8.3% had a female householder with no husband present, and 60.2% were non-families. 29.9% of all households were made up of individuals, and 5.7% had someone living alone who was 65 years of age or older. The average household size was 2.37 and the average family size was 2.93.

In the borough the population was spread out, with 10.8% under the age of 18, 56.6% from 18 to 24, 15.0% from 25 to 44, 10.7% from 45 to 64, and 6.8% who were 65 years of age or older. The median age was 22 years. For every 100 females age 18 and over, there were 84.4 males.

The median income for a household in the borough was $26,652, and the median income for a family was $48,516. Males had a median income of $33,750 versus $24,821 for females. The per capita income for the borough was $12,209. About 11.0% of families and 34.4% of the population were below the poverty line, including 10.8% of those under age 18 and 2.5% of those age 65 or over.

== Education ==
Pennsylvania Western University, Edinboro, a member of the Pennsylvania State System of Higher Education formerly known as Edinboro University of Pennsylvania, was founded in 1857.

=== 1998 Parker Middle School dance shooting ===
On April 24, 1998, James Parker Middle School experienced a school shooting at a banquet facility. Andrew Jerome Wurst, 14, fatally shot 48-year-old John Gillette and wounded another teacher and two students at Nick's Place, a nearby banquet hall during an 8th-grade dinner dance.

== Notable people ==
- Bruce Baumgartner, 1984 Olympic gold medalist in freestyle wrestling
- Clarence B. Culbertson, former Wisconsin state legislator
- William Constantine Culbertson, former U.S. Congressman
- John R. Evans, former Pennsylvania State Representative
- John Randolph Lewis, former Freedmen's Bureau administrator
- Allison McAtee, actress
- Scott Douglas Miller, Virginia Wesleyan University president
- Blidi Wreh-Wilson, former professional football player, Tampa Bay Buccaneers
- David F. Winder, Vietnam War Medal of Honor recipient
- Ali Zaidi, first White House National Climate Advisor
