= List of defunct Massachusetts newspapers =

This is a list of defunct newspapers in Massachusetts, including print and online.

== List of defunct newspapers ==
=== Assonet ===
Newspapers published in Assonet, Massachusetts:

- Village Voice

=== Boston ===
Newspapers published in Boston, Massachusetts:

- American Apollo
- The American Herald
- The American Journal, and Suffolk Intelligencer

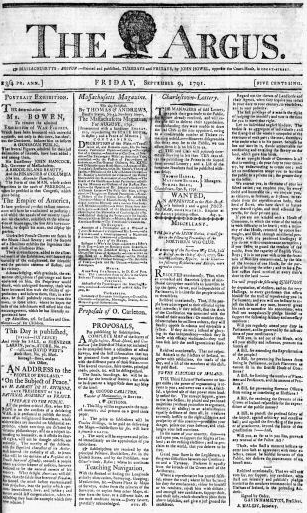
The Argus (Boston), 1791

- The Argus
- Avatar
- The Boston Chronicle
- Boston Courier, 1824–1915
- The Boston Daily Advertiser, 1862
- The Boston Evening-Post, 1735–1775
- Boston Evening Transcript, 1830–1941
- The Boston Evening-post: and the General Advertiser
- The Boston Gazette
- Boston Gazette, Commercial and Political
- The Boston Journal
- The Boston News-Letter
- The Boston Post, 1831–1956
- The Boston Post-Boy, 1734–1754, 1757–1775
- The Boston Post-boy & Advertiser
- The Boston Price Current and Marine Intelligencer
- The Boston Phoenix
- The Boston Record, 1884–1961
- The Boston Transcript
- Boston Traveler, 1845–1967
- The Boston Weekly Advertiser
- The Boston Weekly News-letter
- Boston Weekly News-letter
- The Boston Weekly Post-boy

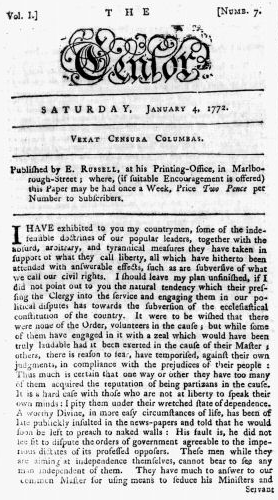
The Censor (Boston), 1772

- The Censor
- The Columbian Centinel
- The Commercial Bulletin, 1859-1990
- The Constitutional Telegraph
- Continental Journal, and Weekly Advertiser
- The Courier
- The Courier. Boston Evening Gazette and Universal Advertiser
- The Courier. Boston Evening Gazette, and General Advertiser
- The Courier and General Advertiser
- Courier de Boston: affiches, announces, et avis
- Editorial Humor
- The Evening Post; and the General Advertiser
- The Exchange Advertiser
- Federal Gazette and Daily Advertiser
- Federal Gazette and General Advertiser

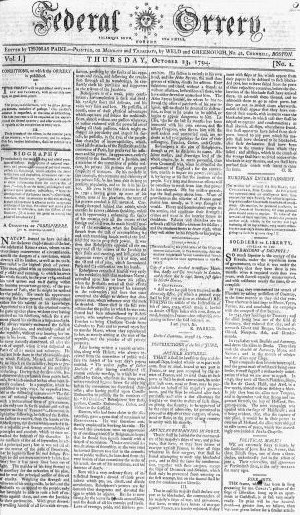
Federal Orrery (Boston), 1794

- Federal Orrery
- Green & Russells Boston Post-boy & Advertiser
- The Herald of Freedom
- The Independent Advertiser
- Independent Chronicle
- The Independent Ledger and the American Advertiser
- J. Russell's Gazette, Commercial and Political
- The Liberator, 1831–1865, abolitionist
- The Massachusetts Centinel
- The Massachusetts Centinel: and the Republican Journal
- The Massachusetts Gazette
- The Massachusetts Gazette. And Boston News-letter
- The Massachusetts Gazette, and the Boston Post-boy and Advertiser
- The Massachusetts Gazette; and the Boston Weekly News-letter
- Massachusetts Mercury
- Massachusetts Spy
- The Mercury
- The Morning Chronicle; and the General Advertiser
- The New-England Chronicle
- The New-England Courant

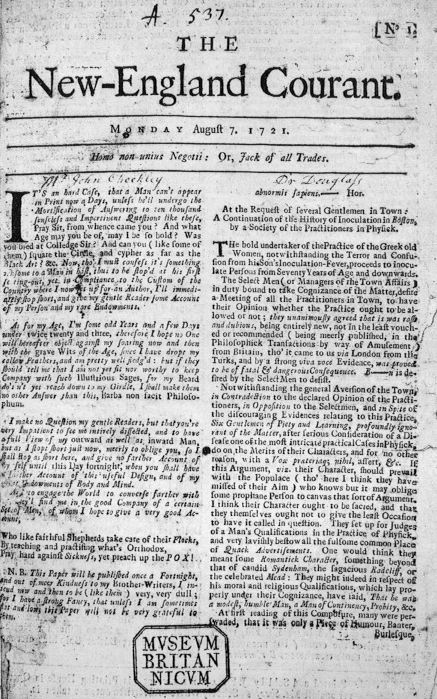
New England Courant (Boston), 1721

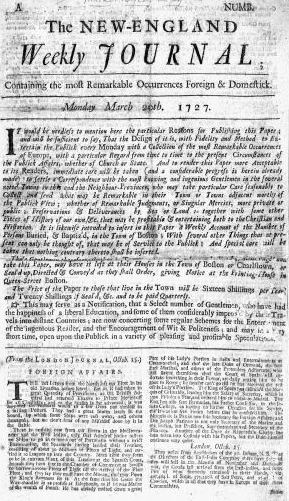
New England Weekly Journal (Boston), 1727

- The New England Weekly Journal
- Nocturnal Mail.
- Publick Occurrences Both Foreign and Domestick
- Polar Star and Boston Daily Advertiser
- Polar-Star: Boston Daily Advertiser
- Russell's Gazette, Commercial and Political
- Saturday Evening Herald, and the Washington Gazette
- The Times, or, The Evening Entertainer
- The Weekly News-letter
- The Weekly Rehearsal

=== Brookfield ===
Newspapers published in Brookfield, Massachusetts:

- The Moral and Political Telegraphie, or, Brookfield Advertiser
- The Political Repository, or, Farmer's Journal
- The Worcester County Intelligencer, or, Brookfield Advertiser
- The Worcester Intelligencer, or, Brookfield Advertiser

=== Cambridge ===
Newspapers published in Cambridge, Massachusetts:

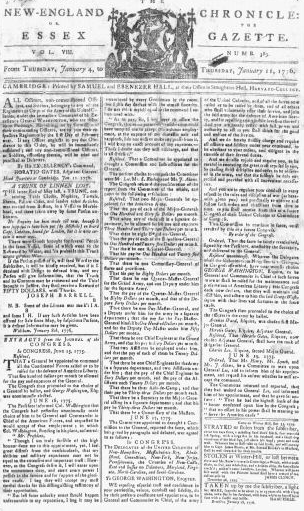
New England Chronicle (Cambridge), January 4, 1776

- Cambridge Chronicle
- The New-England Chronicle, or, The Essex Gazette
- The Broadside

=== Charlestown ===
Newspapers published in Charlestown, Massachusetts:

- The American Recorder, and the Charlestown Advertiser

=== Dedham ===
Newspapers published in Dedham, Massachusetts:

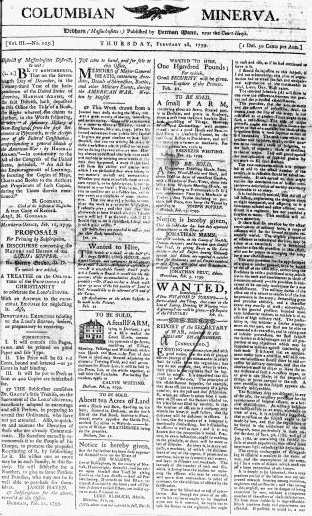
Columbian Minerva (Dedham), 1799

- Columbian Minerva
- Minerva

=== Fall River ===
Newspapers published in Fall River, Massachusetts:

- Fall River Daily Evening News 1870-1926

=== Greenfield ===
Newspapers published in Greenfield, Massachusetts:

- Greenfield Gazette
- Greenfield Gazette. A Register of Genuine Federalism
- Greenfield Gazette. An impartial Register of the Times
- Greenfield Gazette, or, Massachusetts and Vermont Telegraphe
- The Impartial Intelligencer

=== Haverhill ===
Newspapers published in Haverhill, Massachusetts:

- Guardian of Freedom
- Haverhill Federal Gazette
- Impartial Herald
- The Observer

=== Holyoke ===
Newspapers published in Holyoke, Massachusetts:

- The Artisan
- Courrier de Holyoke; French language.
- Der Beobachter; German language, merged into Neu England Rundschau.
- Die Biene; German language.
- Gwiazda; Polish language.
- Holyoke Democrat.
- Holyoke Free Press.
- Holyoke Journal; German language, merged into Neu England Rundschau.
- Holyoke Transcript-Telegram
- Holyoke Weekly Mirror
- L'Annexioniste; French language.
- La Justice; French language.
- La Nueva Era; Spanish language.
- La Presse; French language.
- La Vérité, French language.
- Le Défenseur; French language.
- Le Progrès, French language.
- Le Ralliement; French language.
- Neu England Rundschau; German language.
- Teutonia; German language.
- Voice of Greece.; (Note: Not to be confused with other publications and broadcasting of that name, published by the New England Greek-American Publishing Company, of South Holyoke.) Greek language.
- Zeitgeist; German language.

=== Leominster ===
Newspapers published in Leominster, Massachusetts:

- Political Focus
- The Rural Repository
- The Telescope, or American Herald

=== Leominster ===
Newspapers published in Lowell, Massachusetts:

- The Lowell Courier

=== Nantucket ===
- The Nantucket Beacon (weekly)

=== New Bedford ===
Newspapers published in New Bedford, Massachusetts:

- Columbian Courier
- The Medley, or, Newbedford Marine Journal

=== Newburyport ===
Newspapers published in Newburyport, Massachusetts:

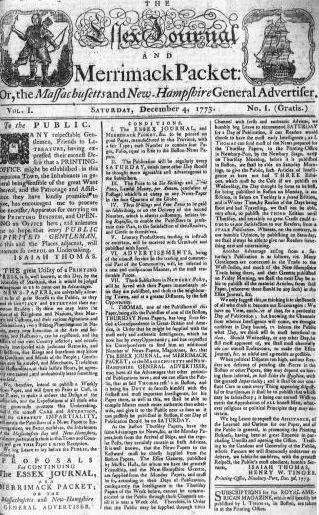
Essex Journal and Merrimack Packet (Newburyport), 1773

- The Essex Journal
- The Essex Journal and Merrimack Packet, or, The Massachu-setts and New-Hampshire general Advertiser
- The Essex Journal and New-Hampshire Packet
- The Essex Journal and the Massachusetts and New-Hampshire General Advertiser
- The Essex Journal, or, New-Hampshire Packet
- The Essex Journal, or, The Massachusetts and New-Hampshire general Advertiser
- The Essex Journal, or, The New-Hampshire Packet and the weekly Advertiser
- Impartial Herald
- The Morning Star
- The Newburyport Herald and Country Gazette
- Political Gazette

=== Northampton ===
Newspapers published in Northampton, Massachusetts:

- Hampshire Gazette
- Patriotic Gazette

=== Pittsfield ===
Newspapers published in Pittsfield, Massachusetts:

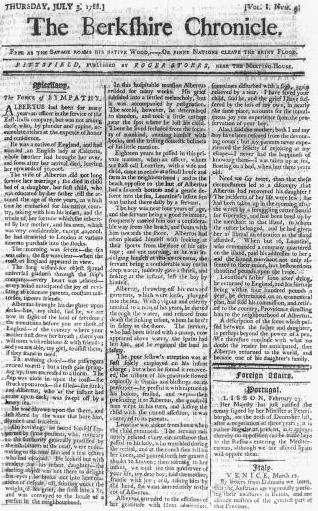
Berkshire Chronicle (Pittsfield), 1788

- Berkshire Chronicle
- Berkshire Chronicle, and the Massachusetts Intelligencer
- The Sun

=== Plymouth ===
Newspapers published in Plymouth, Massachusetts:

- The Plymouth Journal, and the Massachusetts Advertiser
- Plymouth Rock and County Advertiser

=== Provincetown ===
Newspapers published in Provincetown, Massachusetts:

- Provincetown Advocate

=== Salem ===
Newspapers published in Salem, Massachusetts:

- The American Gazette, or, The Constitutional Journal
- The Essex Gazette
- The Impartial Register
- The Salem Gazette
- The Salem Gazette, and General Advertiser
- The Salem Gazette, or, Newbury and Marblehead Advertiser
- The Salem Impartial Register
- The Salem Mercury
- The Salem Mercury: Political, Commercial, and Moral

=== Springfield ===
Newspapers published in Springfield, Massachusetts:

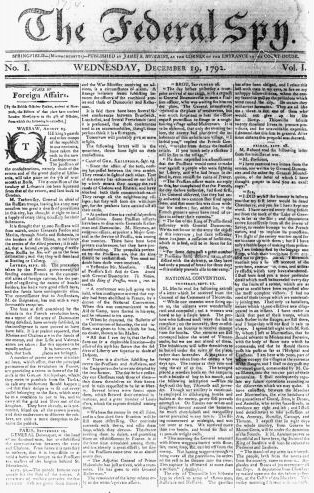
Federal Spy (Springfield), 1792

- Federal Spy
- The Federal Spy and Springfield Advertiser
- Hampshire and Berkshire Chronicle
- The Hampshire Chronicle
- The Hampshire Herald
- The Hampshire Herald, or, The Weekly Advertiser
- The Massachusetts Gazette, or, The General Advertiser
- The Massachusetts Gazette, or, The Springfield and North-ampton weekly Advertiser

=== Stockbridge ===
Newspapers published in Stockbridge, Massachusetts:

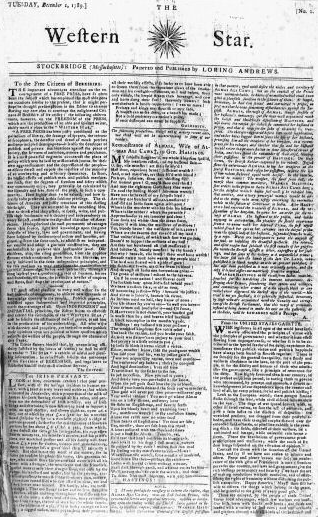
Western Star (Stockbridge), 1789

- Andrews's Western Star
- The Western Star

=== Taunton ===
Newspapers published in Taunton, Massachusetts:

- The Taunton Democrat
- Union Gazette and Democrat
- Taunton Weekly Gazette
- The Household Gazette

=== Watertown ===
Newspapers published in Watertown, Massachusetts:

- The Boston-Gazette, and Country Journal

=== Worcester ===
Newspapers published in Worcester, Massachusetts:

- American Herald, and the Worcerster Recorder
- Haswell's Massachusetts Spy, or, American Oracle of Liberty
- The Independent Gazetteer
- The Massachusetts Spy, or, American Oracle of Liberty
- Thomas's Massachusetts Spy, or, the Worcester Gazette
- Worcester Evening Gazette
- Worcester Telegram
- The Worcester Transcript

== See also ==
- List of current newspapers in Massachusetts
