= Do They Miss Me at Home? =

1852 song written by Caroline Atherton Mason and composed by S. M. Grannis

Song
- Language: English
- Published: 1852
- Composer(s): S. M. Grannis
- Lyricist(s): Caroline Atherton Mason

"Do They Miss Me at Home?" is a song composed by S. M. Grannis with lyrics by Caroline Atherton Mason. The song was published in 1852 and enjoyed great popularity upon its publication. It was later popular among soldiers during the American Civil War.

== Background and composition ==
The lyrics to the song were written as a poem by Mason and published in the Salem Register in 1844, where young Mason published a number of poems under the name "Caro". Her first volume of verse appeared in January 1852, Utterance; Or, Private Voices to the Public Heart, and "Do They Miss Me at Home?" appeared as the first poem. Utterance received a fairly warm reception from literary reviewers.

The poem was set to music by Grannis, and the song published by Oliver Ditson's music publishing house by mid-1852. The original sheet music was credited to Grannis with no mention of the author of the lyrics. The sheet music touted that it was being "sung by the Ampheons", a singing group which included Grannis, "at their principal concerts throughout the country".

== Reception ==
The song was "universally popular in its time", and its popularity carried into the Civil War, where Mason's lyrics, written as a homesick girl away from home at school, readily translated to the plight of the soldiers on both sides, and was among the songs soldiers would sing.

The song generated a number of responses, as well as a parody titled "Do They Miss Me in the Trenches?" Poet James Whitcomb Riley wrote of its lasting popularity in an 1885 poem titled "A Old-Played Out Song".
