= Powars =

Powars is a surname. Notable people with the surname include:

- David S. Powars (fl. 1999), American geologist
- Edward Eveleth Powars (fl. c. 1776–c. 1813), American newspaper publisher
- Page Powars (fl. 2023), American romance writer
