= John Dabney =

American businessman (1752–1819)

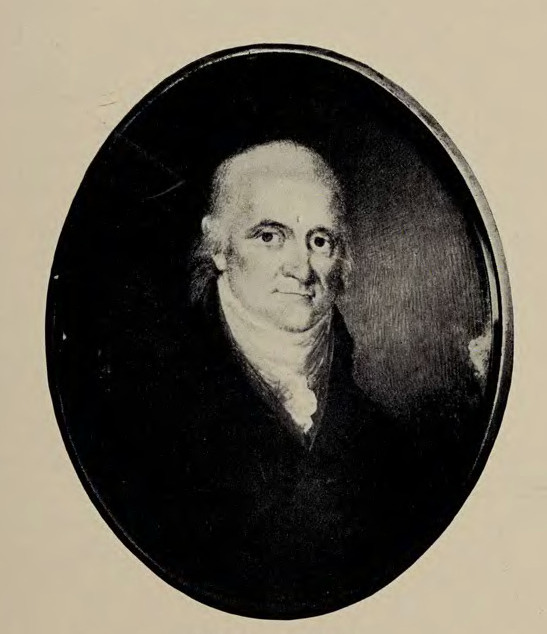
John Dabney

John Dabney (1752–1819) was a postmaster, publisher, and bookseller in Salem, Massachusetts, in the late 18th and early 19th centuries. He was born in Boston in 1752 to Charles Dabney and Elizabeth Gardner. With Thomas C. Cushing, John Dabney published the Salem Mercury newspaper, 1787-1789. In 1790 he married Abigail Mason Peale (1767-1834). Beginning around 1790 he ran the "Salem Book-Store" which offered books for sale or short-term rental; customers included William Bentley. Dabney also served as Salem postmaster ca.1792-1815. He belonged to the North Church in Salem and the Essex Lodge of the Freemasons. Dabney sold the contents of his shop at auction in 1818. He died in 1819.

== Selected titles in Dabney's bookstore & library ==
In 1813, Dabney's stock included:

- Aikin's Annual Review and History of Literature
- Bygge's Travels in the French Republic
- Mrs. Chapone's Works
- M.C. Dallas' Morelando
- Charles Didbin's Song Smith; or, Rigmarole Repository
- Sarah Fielding's Cry, a new dramatick fable
- William Godwin's Fleetwood
- T. Harral's Scenes from Life
- Henry Home's Art of Thinking
- William Jay's Sermons
- Lives of Illustrious Seamen
- Richard Parkinson's Tour in America
- Susanna Rowson's Charlotte Temple
- Anna Seward's Life of Dr. Darwin
- Tabitha Tenney's Female Quixotism, or History of Dorcasina Sheldon
- Maria Tharmott's Sans Souci Park
- Mrs. Thicknesse's School for Fashion
- Richard Twiss's Miscellanies
- Walter Scott's Ballads and Lyrical Pieces

== See also ==
- Books in the United States
