= United Tailoresses Society =

19th-century American trade union

The United Tailoresses Society of New York (UTS) was a trade union established in 1825 to represent female textiles workers in New York. In 1825 and 1831, the UTS organised two strikes calling for improved wages and working conditions; while both strikes were ultimately unsuccessful, they are widely considered to be the first female-led strikes in the United States.

== History ==
In the early 19th century, the majority of tailoresses were widows or single women who lacked specialised skills and training. They primarily worked from home at piece work rates, with their work often supplemented by their children if they had them. During the 1820s, the average weekly income of a tailoress working in New York City for 16 hours a day was $1.25; this was not enough to live on, and many tailoresses required support from charitable organisations in order to survive.

The UTS was established by at least April 1825, when its first meetings were recorded. It was notable among early trade unions by having an exclusively female membership. The UTS called for higher wages and better working conditions for women working in the textiles industry and has retrospectively been described as one of the earliest attempts to organise female workers in the United States.

The first strike organised by the UTS is understood to have happened in 1825, though it did not draw much attention and did not lead to any sustained changes for workers. UTS members struggled to meet en masse during its early years; the majority of tailoresses worked from home due to a lack of factories and sweat shops, making it difficult to achieve consensus and momentum. Outside of its strike, the UTS worked to raise awareness of the poor conditions experienced by textiles workers. They were also notable for blaming in part the circumstances of tailoresses on the dominance of men within the industry. By 1831, the UTS had 600 registered members.

In February 1831, a UTS conference was convened where its secretary, Lavinia Waight, presented a list of their concerns and demands ahead of any potential strike action, triggered by a reduction in piecework rates. The conference was not reported on favourably in the press; the Boston Transcript, for example, while supportive of trade unions, criticised the UTS for its "bitterness of spirit" in the way it presented its concerns. In June 1831, the UTS started a strike; its length has been various described as lasting between four and eight weeks, with it appearing to have concluded by the end of July. 1600 textile workers were estimated to have gone on strike, demanding equal pay to their male counterparts. The UTS called on solidarity from other female tailoresses who were not financially dependent on their income from piece work, asking them not to pick up jobs that would have gone to striking workers. The strike struggled to achieve popular support; the Salem Gazette suggested that women's financial difficulties would be alleviated if they married or remarried. Even among supporters of the strike, this did not extend to the UTS' calls for the liberation of women workers; the Working Man's Advocate, while supportive of the strike, did not agree with the UTS' demands for female independence, and instead supported workers due to its concerns that they would turn to "crime and disgrace", including prostitution, if financial support was not given. The strike was not successful, and the women returned to work with none of their demands met.

While the 1831 was unsuccessful, the actions of the UTS inspired other groups, such as the Female Union Society, established by textile workers in Baltimore in 1833.
