= Timothy Alden (educator) =

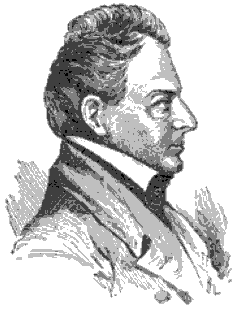
- Born: August 28, 1771; Yarmouth, Massachusetts
- Died: July 5, 1839 (aged 67); Pittsburgh, Pennsylvania
- Resting place: Greendale Cemetery
- Education: Harvard College
- Occupations: Clergyman, educator
- Spouse: Elizabeth Shepherd (Wormsted) Alden (1779–1820) (m. 1797)
- Relatives: John Alden

Timothy Alden (August 28, 1771 – July 5, 1839) was an educator and Christian clergyman. He founded Allegheny College in 1817.

== Early life ==
Timothy Alden was born in Yarmouth, Massachusetts on August 28, 1771. After receiving a theology degree from Harvard College in 1794, he was appointed as a pastor in 1799. As an educator, he held posts in Boston, Cincinnati, and Newark. He founded Allegheny College in 1817 and held the post of president there for 14 years.

== Founder of Allegheny College ==
Allegheny College was founded in April 1815 by Alden, a graduate of Harvard Divinity School. The college was historically affiliated with the United Methodist Church after 1833, although it is currently non-sectarian.

The first class, consisting of four male students, began their studies on July 4, 1816, without any formal academic buildings. Within six years, Alden accumulated sufficient funds to begin building a campus. The first building erected, the library, was designed by Alden himself, and is a notable example of early American architecture. Bentley Hall is named in honor of William Bentley, who donated his private library to the college, a collection of considerable value and significance. In 1824, Thomas Jefferson wrote to Alden, expressing the hope that his University of Virginia could someday possess the richness of Allegheny's library.

Alden served as president of the college until 1831, when financial and enrollment difficulties forced his resignation.

He died in Pittsburgh on July 5, 1839.

== Literary works ==
He wrote Missions among the Senecas, and prepared a catalogue of the New York historical society's library.

=== Courtship of Myles Standish ===
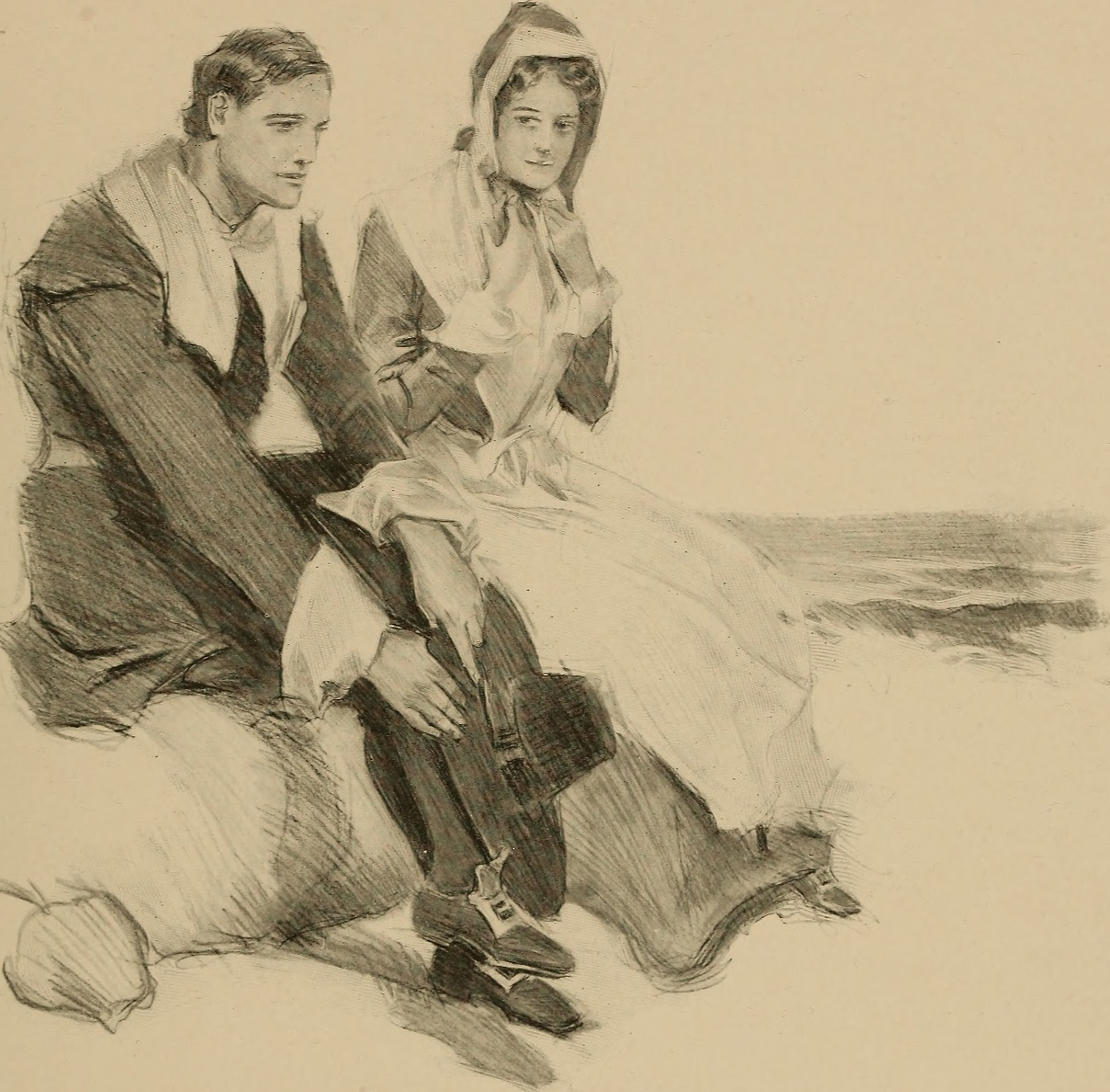
Priscilla Mullins, illustration from a 1903 printing

Set against the backdrop of a fierce Indian war, the tale focuses on a love triangle among three Pilgrims: Myles Standish, Priscilla Mullens, and John Alden. Longfellow claimed the story was true, but the historical evidence is inconclusive. Nevertheless, the ballad was very popular in nineteenth-century America, immortalizing the Mayflower Pilgrims.

In 1814, Alden was the first to publish a popular family tradition about the love triangle of his Mayflower pilgrim ancestors in his book American Epitaphs. This story would later become famous in a poem by Henry Wadsworth Longfellow called The Courtship of Miles Standish. Both are direct descendants of pilgrims John Alden and Priscilla Mullins.

The families of the alleged lovers remained close for several generations, and intermarried, moving together to Duxbury, Massachusetts, in the late 1620s. Descendants still retell the love triangle of their ancestors; the story is nearly 400 years old now.
