= David S. Powars =

- Known for: principal discoverer of the Chesapeake Bay impact crater.
- Awards: Virginia Museum of Natural History’s Thomas Jefferson Award for outstanding contributions to science in Virginia.
- Scientific career
- Fields: Geology

David S. Powars is a Research Geologist with the United States Geological Survey at the Geology and Paleoclimate Science Center, in Reston, Virginia.

He is credited as a principal discoverer of the Chesapeake Bay impact crater. He is the task leader of geological investigation of Coastal Plain (CP) deposits in Chesapeake Bay Region (as part of the Atlantic Watershed Project).

== Awards ==
He received the Virginia Museum of Natural History’s Thomas Jefferson Award for outstanding contributions to science in Virginia.
