= William Bentley =

American journalist and minister

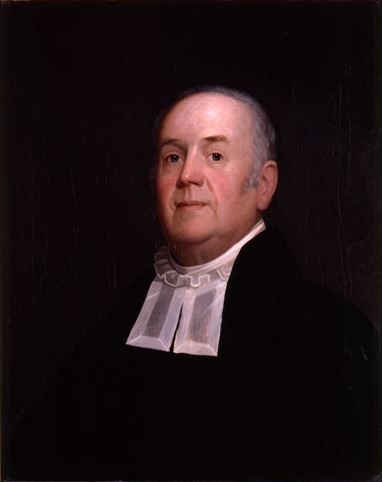
- Born: June 22, 1759; Boston
- Died: December 29, 1819 (aged 60); Salem
- Alma mater: Harvard University
- Occupation: Journalist; Minister

William Bentley (June 22, 1759 – December 29, 1819) was an American Unitarian minister, scholar, columnist, and diarist. He was a polymath who possessed the second best library in the United States (after that of Thomas Jefferson), and was an indefatigable reader and collector of information at the local national and international level. Starting in 1794, he produced a weekly news summary of world events for the local newspaper the Salem Gazette. He provided a highly sophisticated capsule of current political and cultural news, set in a broad historical context. His unsigned reports were widely copied and reproduced in the young nation's newspapers. Bentley believed in Republican enlightenment and the widest possible diffusion of knowledge. He was upset by the increasingly shrill tone of the partisan press, and the superficiality of much journalism.

== Career ==
Bentley graduated from Harvard University in 1777, and worked as a schoolteacher and then a tutor of Latin and Greek at Harvard. On September 24, 1783, he was ordained as a minister and became pastor of the Second Congregational Church in Salem, known as the East Church, where he remained until his death in 1819.

In 1805, Thomas Jefferson asked him to become the first president of the University of Virginia, but Bentley opted to continue with the church. He also declined Jefferson's offer of the role of chaplain for Congress.

In 1811, Bentley was elected a member of the American Philosophical Society in Philadelphia.

Bentley was well liked by his parishioners because of his philosophy of emphasizing good works over rigid doctrine. He himself lived modestly, and was a boarder at the Crowninshield-Bentley House from 1791 until his death in 1819. He gave almost half his salary to help the poorer members of his congregation. He often shared the East Church pulpit with pastors of other sects. He was a strong supporter of public education and frequent tutor and substitute teacher; among the students he taught was Nathaniel Bowditch. The Bentley School in Salem is named for him.

== Scholarship ==
Bentley spoke 21 languages, 7 fluently, and was an inexhaustible reader and book collector. He eventually amassed a library of over 4,000 volumes, one of the largest private libraries in America at the time. In addition to classic Latin and Greek works, Bentley's collection included books on language, philosophy, the sciences, and early Christianity. Bentley had originally drafted his will to leave his collection to Harvard, but withdrew the bequest because of Harvard's failure to award him an honorary Doctor of Divinity degree until just before his death. Bentley was one of the American Antiquarian Society's earliest elected members; elected in 1813, he also left his books on history and natural science to the Antiquarian Society in Worcester, Massachusetts in his revised will. He left the rest of his library to the just-established Allegheny College, founded by fellow Harvard graduate Timothy Alden. Bentley Hall on the Allegheny College campus is named in his memory.

== World news ==
From 1797 to 1817, Bentley wrote columns twice weekly for the Salem Gazette and Salem Register, discussing American and foreign news and politics on current topics such as the China trade, slavery, and the French Revolution, and often reflecting Bentley's Jeffersonian outlook. He twice declined Thomas Jefferson's offers of prominent positions, first as chaplain of the United States Congress, and then as first president of the University of Virginia.

Bentley kept a detailed diary recording not only current events in Salem and the world, but also his own thoughts on a broad range of topics. The diary fills nearly 32 volumes; an abridged 11-volume version was published in 1905.

William Bentley died on December 29, 1819, of a heart attack. The noted orator Edward Everett delivered his eulogy. He is buried in Harmony Grove Cemetery.

== Works on Bentley ==
- Brown, Richard D. Knowledge Is Power: The Diffusion of Information in Early America, 1700-1865 (1991) excerpt and text search pp 197–217
- Ruffin, J. Rixey. 2007. A Paradise of Reason: William Bentley and Enlightenment Christianity in the Early Republic. Oxford: Oxford University Press.
