= Chesapeake Bay impact crater =

Impact crater in the Eastern United States of America

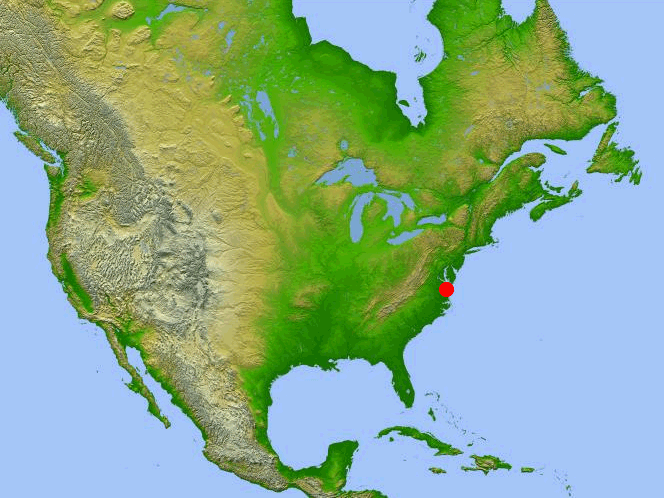
- Location of impact site concerning North America.

- Location within Virginia
- Location: Chesapeake Bay, Cape Charles, Virginia, United States; 37°17′N 76°1′W

Impact crater structure
- Confidence: Confirmed
- Diameter: 53 miles (85 km)
- Depth: 0.81 miles (1.3 km)
- Impactor diameter: 1.9 miles (3 km)
- Age: 35.5 ± 0.3 million
- Exposed: No
- Drilled: Yes
- Bolide type: L chondrite
- Access: U.S. Route 13 to S.R. 184

The Chesapeake Bay impact crater is a buried impact crater, located beneath the mouth of the Chesapeake Bay, United States. It was formed by a bolide that struck the eastern shore of North America about 35.5 ± 0.3 million years ago, in the late Eocene epoch. It is one of the best-preserved "wet-target" impact craters in the world. Continued slumping of sediments over the rubble of the crater has helped shape the Chesapeake Bay.

== Formation and aftermath ==
During the warm late Eocene, sea levels were high, and the tidewater region of Virginia lay in the coastal shallows. The shore of eastern North America, was covered with thick tropical rainforest, and the waters of the gently sloping continental shelf were rich with marine life that was depositing dense layers of lime from their shells.

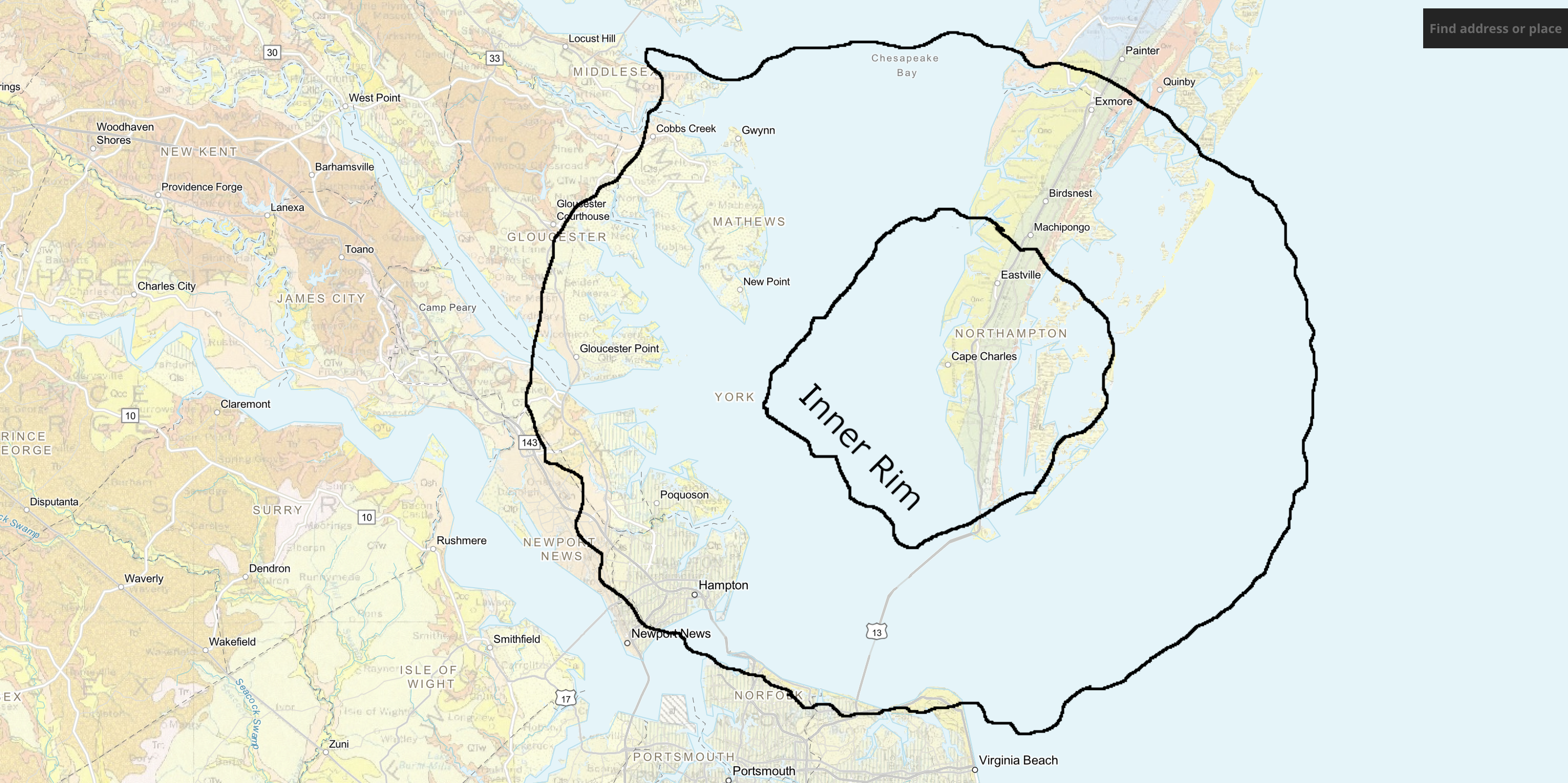
Boundaries of the impact crater

The bolide made impact at a speed of approximately 17.8 kilometers per second (11.1 miles per second), punching a deep hole through the sediment and into the granite continental basement rock. The bolide was completely vaporized, fracturing the basement rock to depths of 8 km (5 mi) and raising a peak ring around it. The crater, 38 km (24 mi) across, is surrounded by a flat-floored terrace-like ring trough with an outer edge of collapsed blocks forming ring faults.

The entire circular crater is about 85 km (53 mi) in diameter and 1.3 km (1,300 m; 0.81 mi; 4,300 ft) deep, an area twice the size of Rhode Island, and nearly as deep as the Grand Canyon. However, numerical modeling techniques by Collins et al. indicate that the post-impact diameter was likely to have been around 40 km (25 mi), rather than the observed 85 km (53 mi).

The surrounding region suffered massive devastation. USGS scientist David Powars, one of the impact crater's discoverers, describes the immediate aftermath: "Within minutes, millions of tons of water, sediment, and shattered rock were cast high into the atmosphere for hundreds of miles along the East Coast." A megatsunami engulfed the land and possibly even reached the Blue Ridge Mountains. The sedimentary walls progressively slumped in, widened the crater, and formed a layer of huge blocks on the floor of the ring-like trough. The slump blocks were then covered with breccia. The entire bolide event, from initial impact to the termination of breccia deposition, lasted only a few hours or days. In the perspective of geological time, the 1.2 km (0.75 mi) thick breccia was an instantaneous deposit. The crater was then buried by additional sedimentary beds that have accumulated during the 35 million years following the impact.

The impact has been identified as the source of the North American tektite field, namely the Georgiaite and Bediasite fields. In 2025, evidence of distal impact signatures were found 380 km distant in the site of Paint Hill (Moore County, North Carolina), with four sedimentary beds, denominated Mount Helicon Formation, containing ejecta, lapilli, tsunami deposits and even black-carbon glass produced by the thermal wave that incinerated biomasses.

== Discovery ==
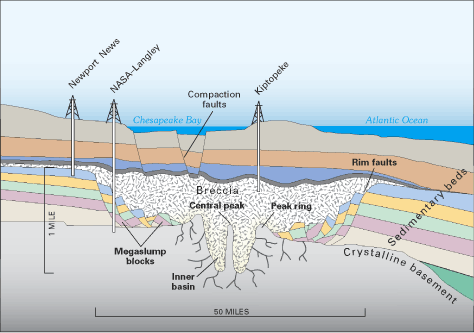
Profile view of the crater

In 1983 evidence of a large impact crater was found buried beneath the lower part of the Chesapeake Bay and its surrounding peninsulas. An 8-inch-thick (20 cm) layer of ejecta was found in a drilling core taken off Atlantic City, New Jersey, about 170 miles (274 km) to the north. The layer contained tektites and shocked quartz grains indicating a bolide impact. In 1993, data from oil exploration revealed the extent of the crater.

== Effects on local rivers ==
The continual slumping of the rubble within the crater has affected the flow of the rivers and shaped the Chesapeake Bay. The impact crater created a long-lasting topographic depression that determined the course of local streams and the eventual location of the Chesapeake Bay. Most important for present-day inhabitants of the area, the impact disrupted aquifers. The present freshwater aquifers lie above a deep salty brine, remnants of 100- to 145-million-year-old Early Cretaceous North Atlantic seawater, making the entire lower Chesapeake Bay area susceptible to groundwater contamination.

== See also ==
- Toms Canyon structure probable impact crater 322 km (200 mi) to the northeast.
- Popigai impact structure of similar age
- Grande Coupure
- Carolina bays

== Bibliography ==
- Poag, C. Wiley. Chesapeake Invader: Discovering America's Giant Meteorite Crater. Princeton, NJ: Princeton University Press, 1999. ISBN 0-691-00919-8
- Post-impact Effects of the Eocene Chesapeake Bay Impact, Lower York-James Peninsula, Virginia, 31st Annual Meeting, Virginia Geological Field Conference, Williamsburg, Virginia, Oct. 19 and 20, 2001, G.H. Johnson et al. (fieldtrip guidebook)
