= Georgiaite =

Rare form of tektite

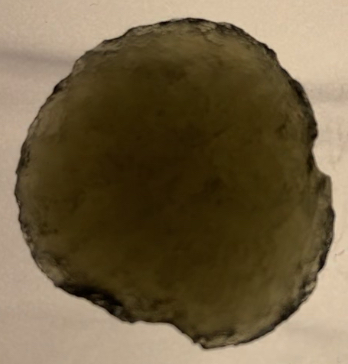
Georgiaite found in Dodge County, GA displaying olive green color.

Georgiaite is a rare form of tektite found only in the state of Georgia in the southeastern United States. These tektites are found in part of the North American strewn field coming from what is believed to be the Chesapeake Bay impact crater in the late Eocene epoch over 35 million years ago. Two strewn fields and tektite groups are currently associated with this impact: the black bediasites in Texas and the green georgiaites in Georgia.

Georgiaite has been found only in the eastern part of central Georgia with only between 1,000 and 2,500 known specimens as of 2018. They are most commonly found as splash-form tektites.

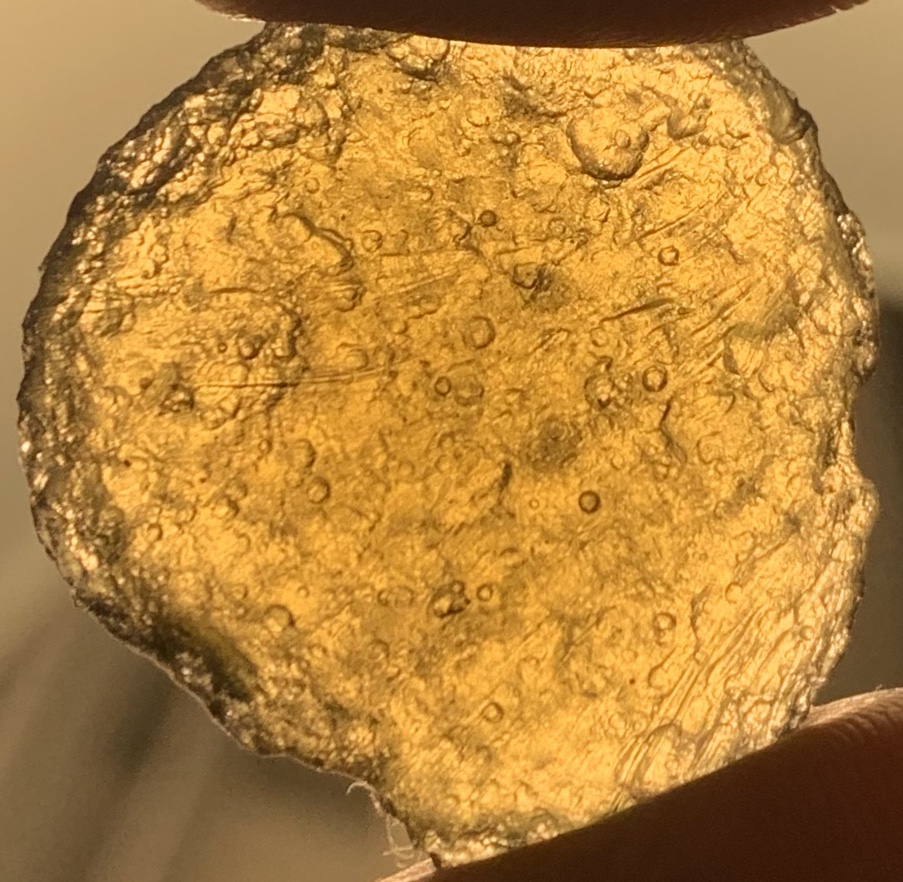
Georgiaite found in Dodge County, GA showing round shape, pock marked surface, and translucence when held up to light.

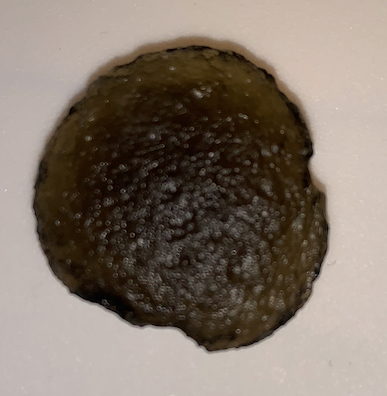
Georgiaite found in Dodge County, GA showing round shape, pock marked surface, and olive green color.

== Characteristics ==
Georgiaite specimens that have been found typically have a round shape and pock marked surfaces caused from the extreme conditions of its formation. Georgiaite most commonly is translucent with an olive green color. The size of Georgiaite can vary but most samples collected average around 2 inches (51 mm) at most. Georgiaite, like other tektites, are silicate glass and most closely resemble obsidian. Unlike other North American tektites, Georgiaite contains silica and potassium while showing no traces of any other major elements.

== Locations ==
Georgiaite has been confirmed to be found only in central and eastern counties in Georgia. The majority of all Georgiaite that has been collected has been from Bleckley County, Georgia and Dodge County, Georgia but other surrounding counties have also found samples in smaller quantities.

== Collections ==
There are several known collections of Georgiaites used for educational purposes, geological study, and for the public to view. One such collection can be found at the Smithsonian Natural History Museum in Washington, D.C. There is also a large donated collection at the Fernbank Museum of Natural History in Atlanta, GA. Georgiaite was first discovered by Dewey Horne and E.P. Henderson in 1938 in Dodge County, GA.
