= Nathaniel Willis (1755–1831) =

American publisher (1755–1831)

Nathaniel Willis (1755–1831) was a publisher and editor in the late 18th century. He participated in the Boston Tea Party in 1773. He issued the Independent Chronicle (1776–1784) and the American Herald in Boston, Massachusetts, and worked for some years with Edward Eveleth Powars as "Powars & Willis."

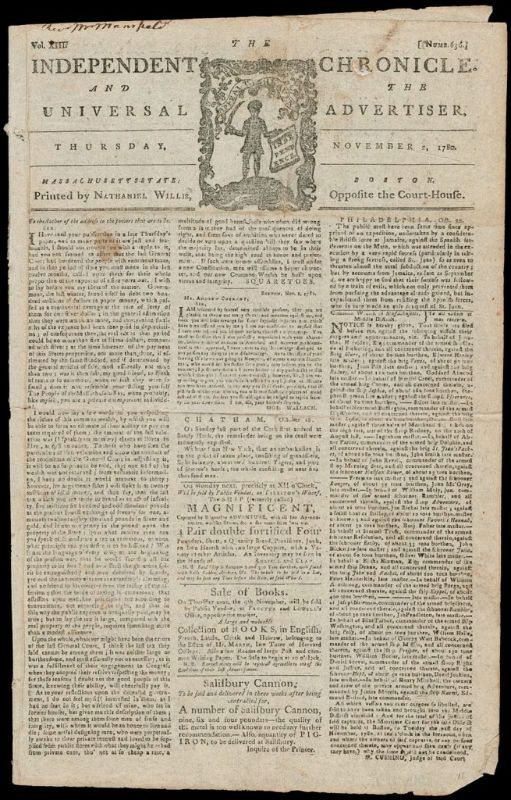
The Independent Chronicle and the Universal Advertiser, Boston, "printed by Nathaniel Willis, opposite the court-house," Queen Street, Boston, 1780 (Museum of Fine Arts, Boston)

"In 1784 he sold his interest in the "Independent Chronicle," and became one of the pioneer journalists of the unsettled West. He removed first to Winchester, Virginia, where he published a paper for a short time; then to Shepardstown, where he also published a paper; and thence in 1790 to Martinsburg, Virginia, where he founded the Potomac Guardian and edited it till 1796. In that year he went to Chillicothe, Ohio, and established the Scioto Gazette, the first newspaper in what was then known as the Northwestern Territory. He was printer to the government of the territory, and afterwards held an agency in the Post Office Department. He bought and cultivated a farm near Chillicothe, on which he ended his days April 1, 1831."

Willis married "Lucy Douglas, of New London, Connecticut;" children included Nathaniel Willis, also a newspaperman.

== See also ==
- Independent Chronicle (Boston, Massachusetts), published by Willis
- American Herald, published by Willis
