= Caroline Atherton Mason =

American writer

- Born: 27 July 1823; Marblehead, Massachusetts, U.S.
- Died: 13 June 1890 (aged 66); Fitchburg, Massachusetts, U.S.
- Occupation: Poet
- Spouse: Charles Mason
- Writing career
- Notable works: Do They Miss Me At Home? The King's Quest; Utterance: or Private Voices to the Public Heart; Lost Ring and other Poems

Caroline Atherton Briggs Mason (27 July 1823 – 13 June 1890) was an American poet whose works include Do They Miss Me At Home? and The King's Quest. Many of her poems became popular hymns in the Unitarian church.

== Early life ==
Mason was born in Marblehead, Massachusetts, the daughter of physician Dr. Calvin Briggs and Rebecca Monroe. She was educated at Bradford Academy in Bradford, Massachusetts, and began writing when quite young. In 1852, her family moved to Fitchburg, Massachusetts.

== Published works ==
Her first poems were published in the Salem Register under the name "Caro". Mason was also published in The Congregationalist, The Liberal Christian, The Monthly Religious Magazine, The Independent and The Christian Union. She contributed largely to the hymnology of the Unitarian church, and her poetry generally is strong in the didactic element.

She published a collection of poetry, Utterance: or Private Voices to the Public Heart in 1852 and a Sunday school story, Rose Hamilton in 1859. In 1891, she published Lost Ring and other Poems in 1891.

She contributed largely to the hymnology of the Unitarian church, and her poetry generally is strong in the didactic element.

== Major works ==
One of her early poems, Do They Miss Me at Home? was set to music by S.M. Grannis and published by mid-1852. It obtained immediate and widespread popularity in the United States and in England. Its popularity carried into the Civil War, where Mason's lyrics, written as a homesick girl away from home at school, readily translated to the plight of the soldiers on both sides, and was among the songs soldiers would sing.

Several of Mason's poems were honored, notably "The King's Quest".

== Personal life ==
Mason married Charles Mason, an attorney in Fitchburg, in 1853.

== Selected works ==
- Do They Miss Me At Home?
- The King's Quest
- Utterance: or Private Voices to the Public Heart
- Lost Ring and other Poems
- I cannot walk in darkness long
- 0 God. I thank Thee for each sight
- The changing years, eternal God
