= Abijah Adams =

American journalist (1754 – 1816)

- Born: August 14, 1740; Canterbury, Connecticut Colony, British America
- Died: March 18, 1816 (aged 75); Boston, Massachusetts, U.S.
- Occupations: Newspaper publisher, printer
- Years active: 1760s–1810s
- Known for: Publisher of the Boston Gazette; American Revolutionary-era journalism

Abijah Adams (c.1754 – May 18, 1816) was a journalist who frequently found himself involved in controversies. He was born in Boston, Massachusetts.

He was trained as a tailor, and married Lucy Ballard in 1790. In 1799, he took a job with the newspaper the Independent Chronicle, a Jeffersonian newspaper controlled by his brother, Thomas Adams. That year he was convicted of libel against the Federalist-controlled state government for his role in the newspaper's vocal opposition to the Alien and Sedition Acts. He was sentenced to thirty days in jail. The following year, he was promoted to the position of editor, which he shared with Ebenezer Rhodes. In 1811, he received a conviction for libel arising from his comments on the conduct in office of Theophilus Parsons, who was at the time the Chief Justice of the Massachusetts Supreme Judicial Court, but was later pardoned.

== Death ==
Adams died in 1816, aged 62.
