= Ruter Hall =

- U.S. National Register of Historic Places
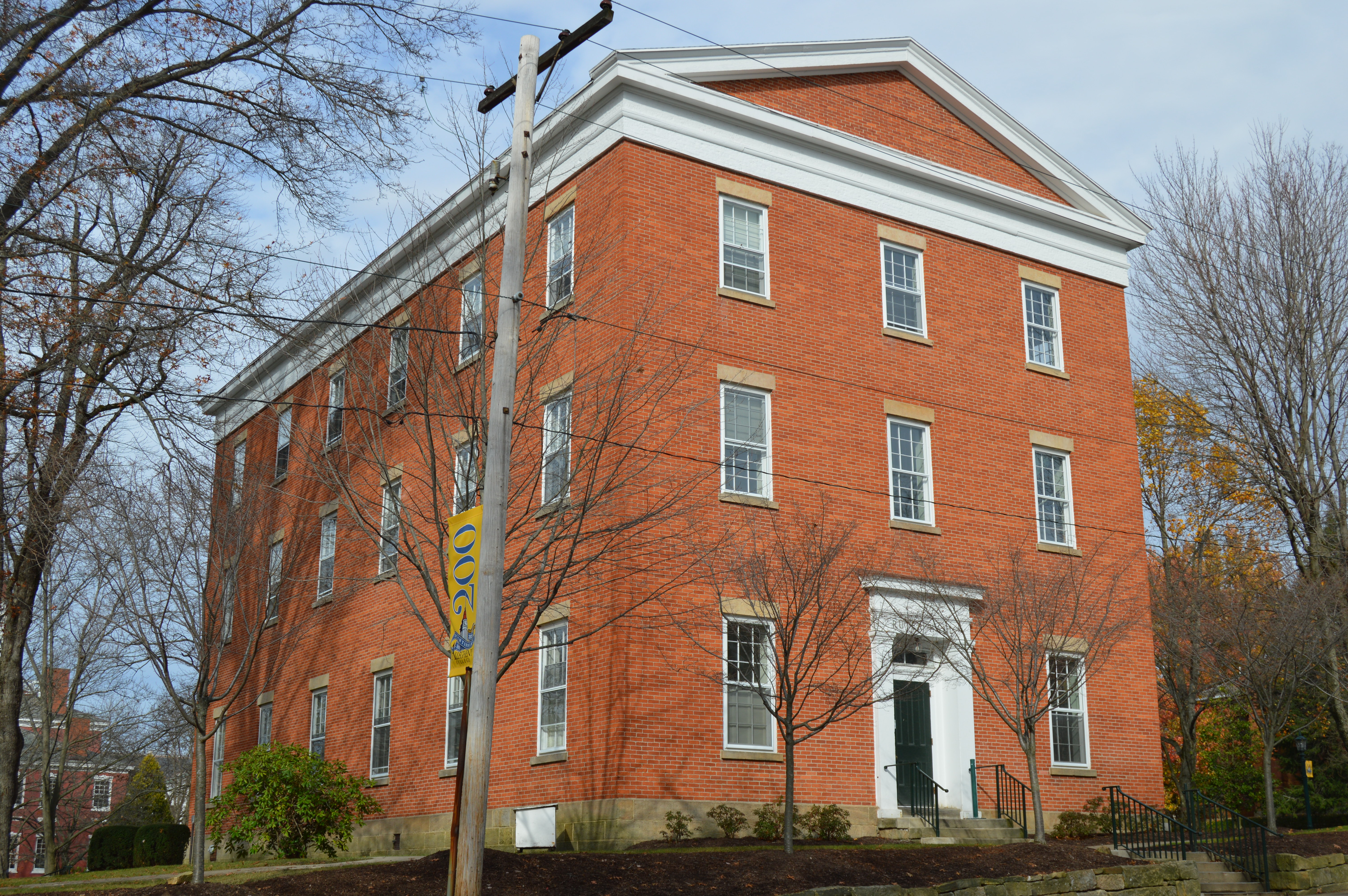
- Front and southern side

- Location within Pennsylvania Location within the United States
- Location: N. Main St. on the Allegheny College campus, Meadville, Pennsylvania
- Coordinates: 41°38′54″N 80°8′46″W
- Area: 1 acre (0.40 ha)
- Built: 1853
- Architectural style: Greek Revival
- NRHP reference No.: 78002382
- Added to NRHP: September 18, 1978

Ruter Hall is an historic building on the campus of Allegheny College at Meadville, Pennsylvania, United States.

It was added to the National Register of Historic Places in 1978.

== History and architectural features ==
Built in 1853, this historic structure is a three-story, rectangular, brick building that was designed in the Greek Revival style, measures fifty feet by ninety feet, and has a low gabled roof and pediment. It was the second building built on the Allegheny College campus, after Bentley Hall, and was named for Rev. Martin Ruter, the first Methodist president of the college from 1834 to 1837. It currently houses the college's Modern and Classical Languages and International Studies departments.
