= Allegheny College =

Private college in Meadville, Pennsylvania, US

Coordinates: 41.6498°N 80.1450°W

- Motto: Greek: Πιστει την αρετιν εν δε τηι αρετιν την γνωσειν Hebrew: תגל ערבה ותפרח כחבצלת
- Motto in English: "Add to your faith virtue, and to your virtue knowledge" (2 Peter 1:5) "The desert shall rejoice and the blossom as the rose" (Isaiah 35:1)
- Type: Private liberal arts college
- Established: 1815; 211 years ago
- Accreditation: MSCHE
- Academic affiliations: GLCA; Annapolis Group
- Endowment: $279.5 million (2025)
- President: Ron Cole
- Faculty: 151 (2025)
- Students: 1,068 (fall 2025)
- Location: Meadville, Pennsylvania, United States
- Campus: Small town, 542 acres (219 ha) total
- Colors: Blue and gold
- Nickname: Gators
- Sporting affiliations: NCAA Division III – PAC
- Mascot: Chompers
- Website: allegheny.edu

Pennsylvania Historical Marker
- Designated: November 19, 1946

Allegheny College is a private liberal arts college in Meadville, Pennsylvania, United States. Founded in 1815, Allegheny is the oldest college in continuous existence under the same name west of the Allegheny Mountains. It is a member of the Great Lakes Colleges Association and the Presidents' Athletic Conference and it is accredited by the Middle States Commission on Higher Education.

== History ==
=== Early history ===
Allegheny College was founded in April 1815 by Timothy Alden, a graduate of Harvard's School of Divinity. The college had been affiliated with the United Methodist Church from 1833 until the relationship was suspended in 2020, but has not integrated religion into the classroom or pedagogy.

The first class, consisting of four male students, began their studies on July 4, 1816, without any formal academic buildings. Within six years, Alden accumulated sufficient funds to begin building a campus. The first building erected, the library, was designed by Alden himself, and is a notable example of early American architecture. Bentley Hall is named in honor of William Bentley, who donated his private library to the college, a collection of considerable value and significance. In 1824, Thomas Jefferson wrote to Alden, expressing the hope that his University of Virginia could someday possess the richness of Allegheny's library. Alden served as president of the college until 1831 when financial and enrollment difficulties forced his resignation. Ruter Hall was built in 1853.

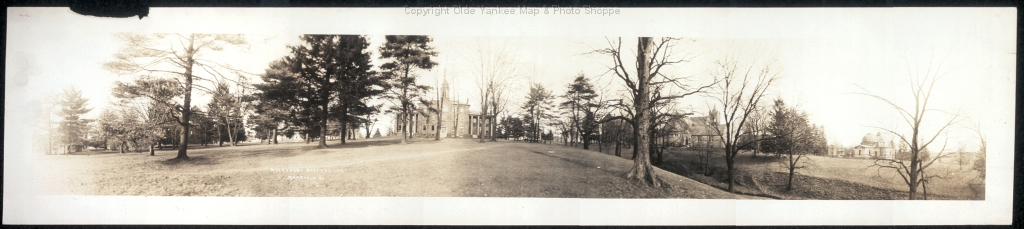
Allegheny College in 1909

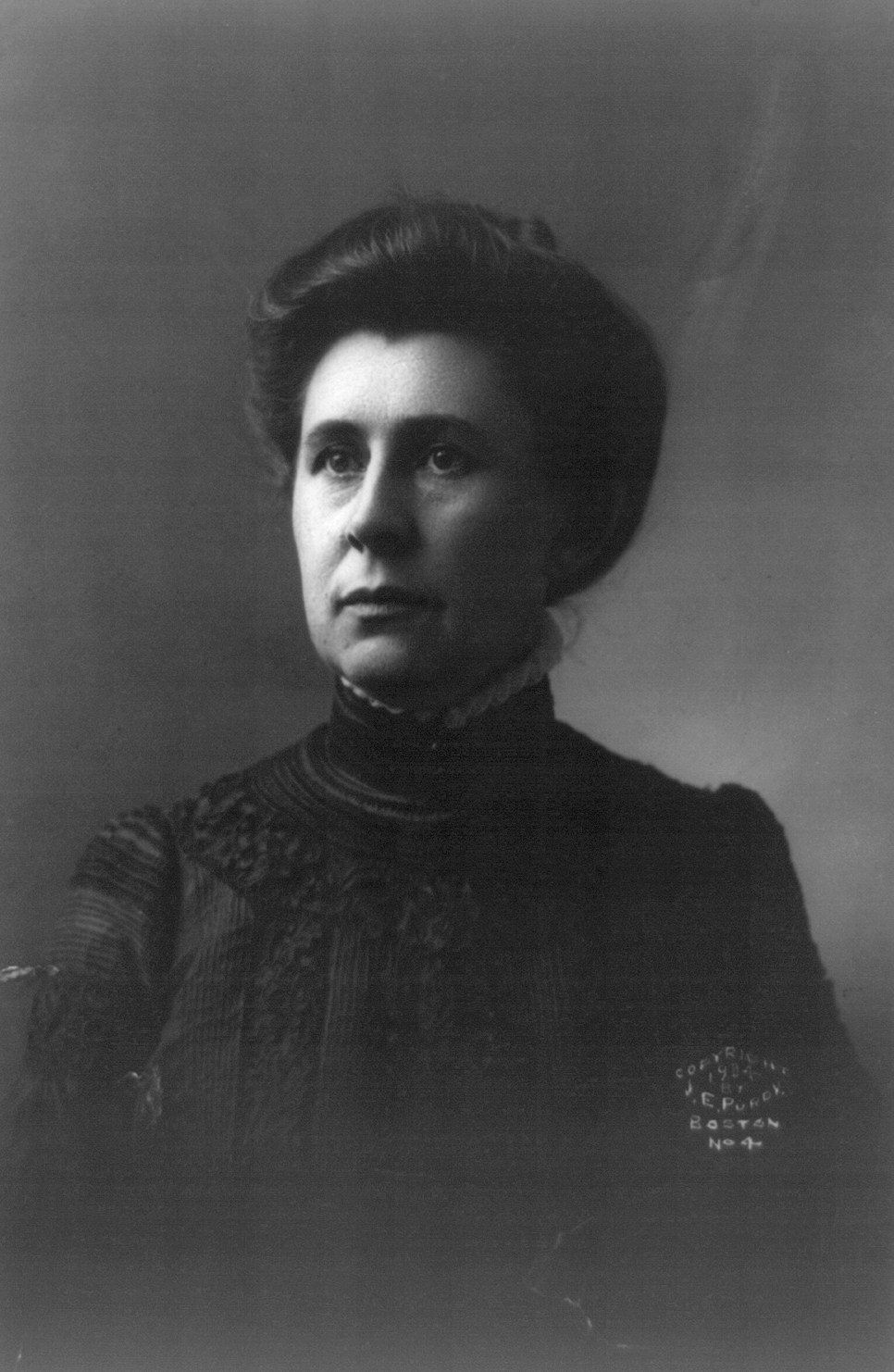
Allegheny graduate Ida M. Tarbell, crusading muckraking journalist who exposed abuses by Standard Oil. Allegheny began admitting women in 1870

Allegheny began admitting women in 1870, early for a US college; a woman was valedictorian of the Allegheny class of 1875. By the time Ida Tarbell, future journalist, arrived in 1876, nineteen women had attended Allegheny and only two had graduated. Tarbell described Ruter Hall in her writing, "...looking out on the town in the valley, its roofs and towers half hidden by a wealth of trees, and beyond it to a circle of round-breasted hills. Before I left Allegheny I had found a very precious thing in that severe room--the companionship there is in the silent presence of books."

In 1905, Allegheny built Alden Hall as a new and improved preparatory school. Over the decades, the college has grown in size and significance while still maintaining ties to the community.

=== Recent history ===
In 1970, the film Been Down So Long It Looks Like Up to Me based on the Richard Fariña novel was filmed on college grounds.

While the word "Allegheny" is a brand for the college, it is also the name of a county, a river, and a mountain range, and the school has tried to prevent other entities from using this word. For example, Allegheny objected in 2006 when Penn State tried to rename one of its campuses "Allegheny". Allegheny president Richard Cook said 'Allegheny' was "our brand." It sued the Philadelphia's Allegheny Health and Research Foundation in 1997 to change its name.

Under president Richard J. Cook, Allegheny was reported to have had a "stronger endowment, optimal enrollment, record retention rates, innovative new programs and many physical campus improvements." These years were marked by significant growth in the endowment, marked by a $115-million fund-raising drive, bringing the endowment to $150 million. In 2008, James H. Mullen Jr. took office as the 21st president of Allegheny.

The college and the town cooperate in many ways. One study suggested the Allegheny College generates approximately $93 million annually into Meadville and the local economy.

== Campus ==
The campus has 40 principal buildings on a 79-acre (32 ha) central campus located just north of downtown Meadville, a 203-acre (0.82 km^{2}) outdoor recreational complex north of campus, called the Robertson Athletic Complex, and the 283-acre (115 ha) Bousson nature reserve, protected forest, and experimental forest.

=== Non-residential buildings ===
- The Pelletier Library (in 2008) had 922,540 volumes (491,284 microform titles). Another estimate was that the library had 420,000 bound volumes, 227,000 microform titles, 1,000 periodicals, and 261,000 U.S. government and Pennsylvania state documents. The library has noteworthy Americana and Ida Tarbell collections, as well as materials concerning abolitionist John Brown's years in Crawford County. computer lab, audiovisual center, and music listening system are there too. It is named after past president Lawrence L. Pelletier who served from 1955 to 1980. The Learning Commons, which is located in Pelletier Library, assists students with writing, research, public speaking and study skills, and also offers disability services.
- Newton Observatory houses a nine-inch refracting telescope and a computer-interfaced 10-inch Meade LX200 telescope with CCD camera. The Office of Public Safety and Security is also housed in the Newton Observatory.
- The Allegheny College Center for Experiential Learning (ACCEL) coordinates career internships, off-campus study programs, service-learning, pre-professional advising, and leadership development.
- A Counseling Center, which has joined the Winslow Health Center in Schultz Hall, offers guidance for students in adjusting to student life. The center is staffed by registered therapists and provides crisis and walk in hours to students, free of charge.
- Winslow Health Center is staffed by a registered nurse and offers routine diagnosis and treatment. The center also offers free STI testing to students on a monthly basis.
- The main dining facility is in Brooks Hall, and students can also dine at McKinley's Food Court in the campus center. There have been efforts by students to support the relationship between food services and local farmers. Allegheny won a $79,545 grant in May 2009 to buy equipment to help with composting food waste, including a shredder mill, screening plant, conveyor, skid-steer loader and leaf collection system.
- The Center for Political Participation was founded at Allegheny in 2002 by political science professor Daniel M. Shea, following concerns about low youth voter turnout in the 2000 presidential election. The CPP conducts scholarly research related to youth political participation; sponsors on-campus events related to politics and the electoral process, such as panel discussions; and conducts community-outreach efforts, including the Model Campaign USA program, a campaign simulation designed to get high school students interested in electoral politics.
- Henderson Campus Center was recently renovated and includes McKinley's food court, the bookstore, the game room, Grounds for Change—the student-run coffee house, the post office, and campus offices of college departments as well as student organizations. Also included in the Henderson Campus Center are the Bowman, Penelac & Megahan Art Galleries. Allegheny has auctioned art at times to raise money to renovate other projects, such as the college's Doane School of Art.
- Sports facilities include the $13 million David V. Wise Sport & Fitness Center, which opened in 1997.
- A Women's Center which is located in the basement of Walker Hall was established in 2003 to be a resource for research on gender issues and women's history.
- The college established the Center for Economic and Environmental Development in 1997.
Allegheny campus buildings

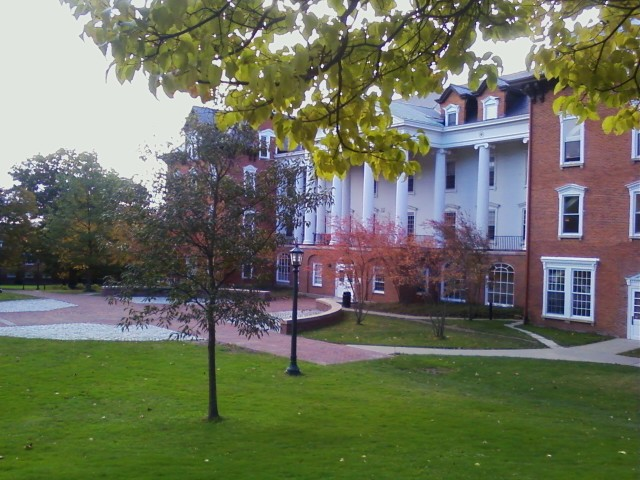
Brooks Hall

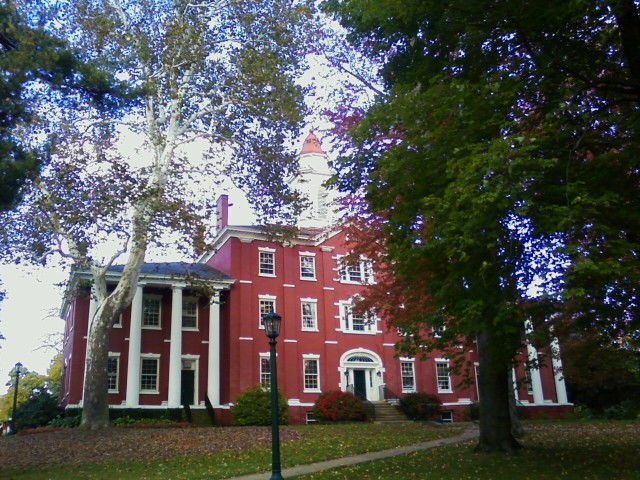
Bentley Hall

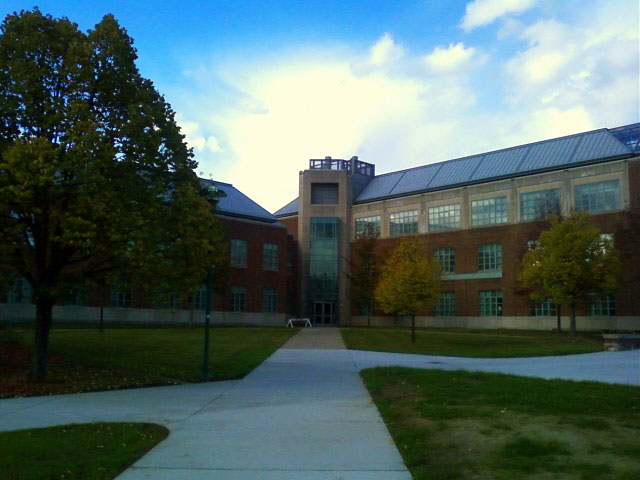
The Doane Hall of Chemistry

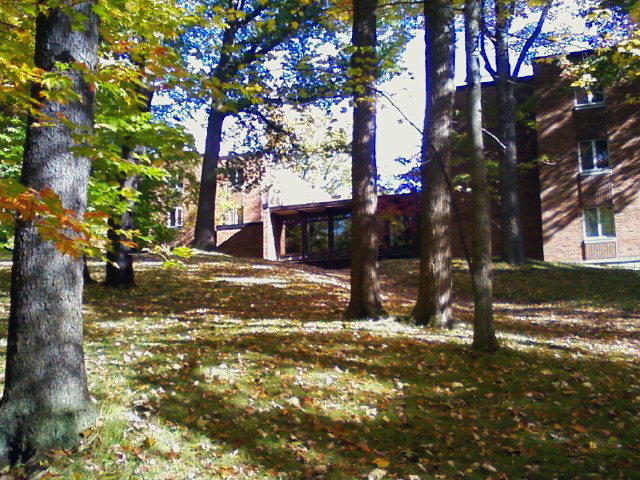
Ravine Hall

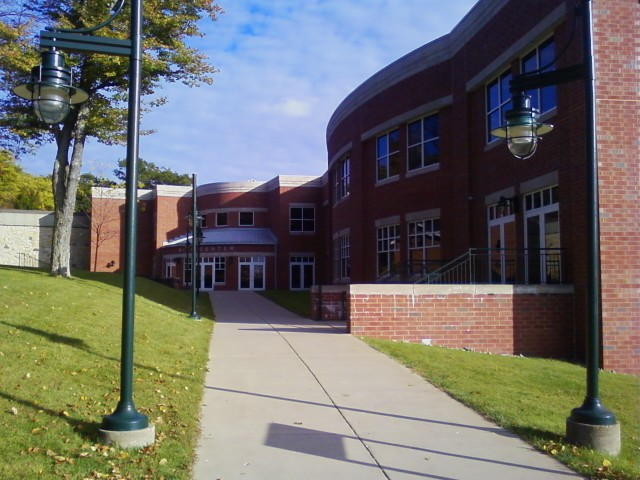
Student entrance to the Wise Center

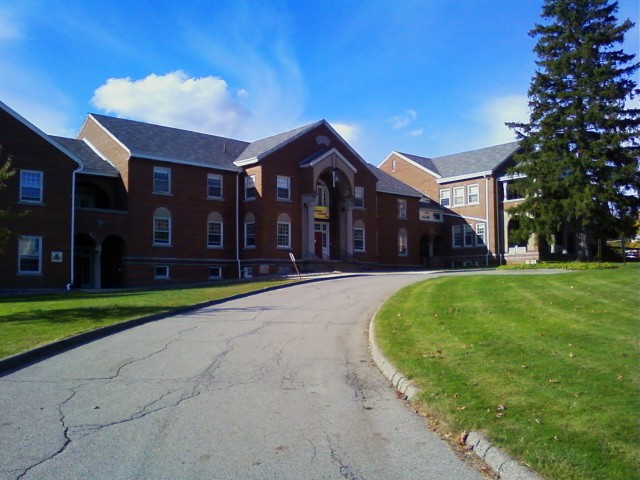
The Oddfellows building

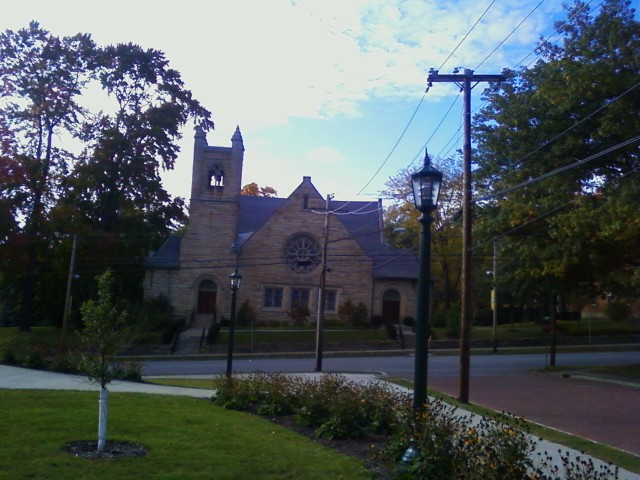
Ford chapel

== Academics ==
Allegheny College's majors and minors fall into three spheres: Humanities, Natural Sciences, and Social Sciences. There are some majors, such as Environmental Studies or International Studies, which fall into the interdisciplinary category. The college requires students to choose a minor as well as a major and encourages "unusual combinations" of majors and minors. A student's major can be in the humanities, social sciences or natural sciences, but that student's minor must be in a different division than their major.

Allegheny is accredited by the Middle States Commission on Higher Education (MSCHE).

About 30% of the college's 2,100 students graduate in one of the STEM disciplines—science, technology, engineering, and math. Students must take at least two courses (8 semester credit hours) in a discipline other than their major or minor.

The most popular majors, in terms of 2021 graduates, were Biology/Biological Sciences (35), Psychology (34), and Environmental Science (33).

Total credits for graduation are 128 semester credit hours and no more than 64 credit hours can be from any one department. Almost all courses carry four semester hours of credit.

The college requires all students to take a three-seminar series which "encourages careful listening and reading, thoughtful speaking and writing, and reflective academic planning and self-exploration," to be completed in their first two years. Sophomores typically meet with faculty advisers eight times a year.

Allegheny requires seniors to complete a senior project in their major. Some senior projects can be quite ambitious; in 2007, one senior project involved comprehensive instructions for installing solar panels on the roof of a campus building.

Allegheny divides its academic calendar into two 15-week semesters. The school year typically runs from the last week of August to mid-May, with a short fall break in mid-October, a Wednesday-to-Sunday Thanksgiving break, a month-long winter break from mid-December to mid-January, and a week-long spring break in the third week of March.

It formerly had a Chinese language minor, which was discontinued with the Chinese program itself in 2022.

=== Study abroad ===
Allegheny offers direct enrollment programs at Lancaster University, England; James Cook University, Australia; University of Natal, South Africa; Capital Normal University, China; and Karl-Eberhard University, Germany. It also offers language and area studies programs in Seville, Spain; Angers, France; Karls-Eberhard University, Germany; and Querétaro, Mexico and internship programs in London, England; Paris, France; and Washington D.C. Programs geared to specific majors are also available, including environmental studies at the Arava Institute for Environmental Studies, Israel; and the Center for Sustainable Development, Costa Rica; marine biology at the Duke University Marine Lab in North Carolina; and political science at American University. Allegheny faculty members have led domestic summer-study tours to New York, Yellowstone, Austria, Costa Rica, and South Africa.

=== Cooperative and reciprocal programs ===
Allegheny has medical school cooperative programs available with three institutions: Philadelphia College of Osteopathic Medicine, Drexel University and Jefferson Medical College. Allegheny offers pre-professional programs in law and health. It has an arrangement with Drexel University College of Medicine to admit two Allegheny students who meet specific criteria (grades, MCAT scores). It has an arrangement with the William E. Simon School of Business Administration at the University of Rochester to have preferred admission to selected students by the end of their junior year. Allegheny offers cooperative 3–2 liberal arts/professional programs in engineering with Case Western Reserve University, Columbia University, the University of Pittsburgh, and Washington University in St. Louis. There is also a 3–2 Master of Information Systems Management (MISM) program reciprocal agreement with Carnegie Mellon University.

=== Faculty ===
Four faculty won Fulbright Awards in March 2001. Faculty sometimes focus on the local area; for example, economics professor Stephen Onyeiwu conducted a study of manufacturing in the northwestern Pennsylvania region. Ninety percent of faculty have terminal degrees in their respective fields. Books by faculty include Congressional Women and Comedy from Shakespeare to Sheridan. Faculty actively publish on a wide range of subjects from the biology of woodpeckers, to structural features of ribosomal RNA, to freshwater invertebrates. In 2018, Professor Shannan Mattiace won a Fulbright Award to teach and conduct research in Chile.

=== Admissions ===
There were 5,479 applications for admission to the class of 2022 (enrolling fall 2018): 3,485 were admitted (63.6%) and 474 enrolled (an admissions yield of 13.6%). The average high school GPA of enrolled freshmen was 3.51, and 35% had a high school GPA of 3.75 or higher. The middle 50% range of enrolled freshmen on SAT scores was 560–680 for reading and writing, and 560-660 for math, while the ACT Composite middle 50% range was 24–30.

=== Rankings ===
Academic rankings

Liberal arts
- U.S. News & World Report: 80
- Washington Monthly: 42

National
- Forbes: 403
- WSJ/College Pulse: 164

Times Higher Education World University Rankings ranked Allegheny 60th among the top 100 U.S. liberal arts colleges for 2022.

U.S. News & World Report ranked Allegheny as tied for 80th among liberal arts colleges, 16th in "Best Undergraduate Teaching," tied for 38th in "Top Performers for Social Mobility", and 58th in "Best Value Schools" in the United States for 2025.

Washington Monthly, which rates schools based on the degree to which they "contribute to the public good" by improving social mobility, producing research, and promoting service, ranked Allegheny 42nd among 203 liberal arts colleges in 2022.

== Student life ==
=== Students ===
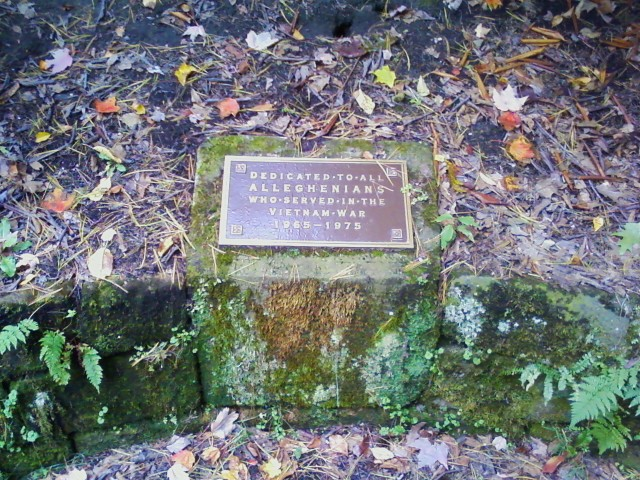
One of many war memorials on campus (some dating back to the time of the Civil War). This memorial honors Allegheny students who fought in the Vietnam War

Students generally are required to live on campus for all four years, and may reside in traditional dormitories, apartment-style housing, or college-owned houses.

The demographics of students as of fall 2015 were: White (non-Hispanic) 75.9%; Hispanic/Latino 7.0%, Black (non-Hispanic) 5.9%; Two or more races 4.7%, Non-resident alien 2.8%, Asian & Pacific Islander 2.4%; American Indian or Alaskan native 0.1%; Unknown 1.2% .

Allegheny students in 2008 come from 33 states and 25 other countries. Allegheny had a "diversity index" of .15 on a scale of .99=extremely diverse to .01=not diverse.

Students participate in volunteer activities: in the fall semester of 2011, the student body contributed 25,000 hours of volunteer service to the community. Some Allegheny students volunteered to help restore businesses in hurricane-ravished New Orleans. Residence halls and classrooms are closed during summers. An Allegheny Student Government has an active role in formulating college policy, curriculum choices, personal conduct, promoting cultural programs, and making decisions about the school's calendar.

Information about students is generally kept private in keeping with the 1974 "Family Educational Rights and Privacy Act" which prohibits colleges from releasing information about their students without student permission. Accordingly, parents can not learn about their son's or daughter's grades unless a waiver is signed permitting release of such information. The privacy policy can sometimes lead to problems, particularly when students have mental health problems but the school is prevented legally from contacting parents. In 2002, one Allegheny student committed suicide, and his parents sued the school; a jury in 2006 found that the school was not liable or negligent. This case helped focus national attention on the competing issues of student privacy and parental rights.

Official college policy is to discourage underage drinking, although there have been incidents of violations at off-campus parties. Incoming students are required to take an online course about the dangers of alcohol abuse. The school punishes transgressions with disciplinary action.

=== Media ===
Students run a campus radio station WARC 90.3 FM and a publication called "The Allegheny Review" of undergraduate literature. The college hosts outside speakers. Allegheny has numerous student groups and organizations such as an astronomy club, a College Choir, an Outing Club, and a Peace Coalition. There are over 100 clubs and organizations offered at Allegheny. The Allegheny newspaper is called The Campus. It is distributed weekly at locations all over the college. It covers campus news, features, opinion and a wrap-up of the college sports. The Campus is entirely student-run, with an editorial board of students in charge of making all executive decisions for the publication. The Allegheny alternative magazine is called Overkill. It is tri-semester student publication distributed in unconventional locations around campus, such as in vending machines, fireplaces, and chandeliers. It features student editorials, poetry, non-fiction and fiction pieces, art, and photography with a highly distinctive design and attitude.

Allegheny has welcomed a variety of entertainers and guest speakers over the last several years including John Updike, Dave Matthews, Dick Cheney, Bill Clinton, W.D. Snodgrass, Adam Sandler, George Carlin, The Vienna Choir Boys, Rusted Root, Ben Folds, The Roots, Stephen Lynch, The Fray, Jimmy Fallon, and comedian Wayne Brady. There have been "live" art shows in which invited artists, over an eight-hour period, created 10-by-10-foot "drawings" on gallery walls while spectators watched.

=== Athletics ===
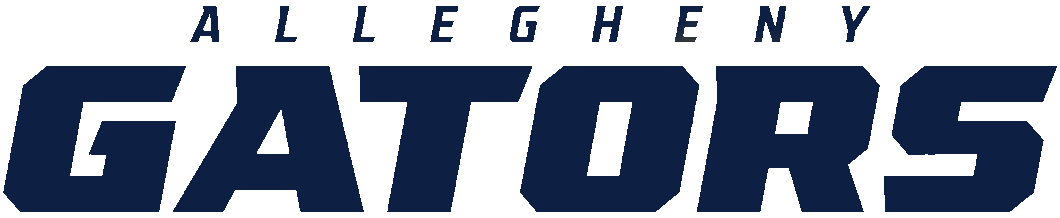
Allegheny athletics wordmark

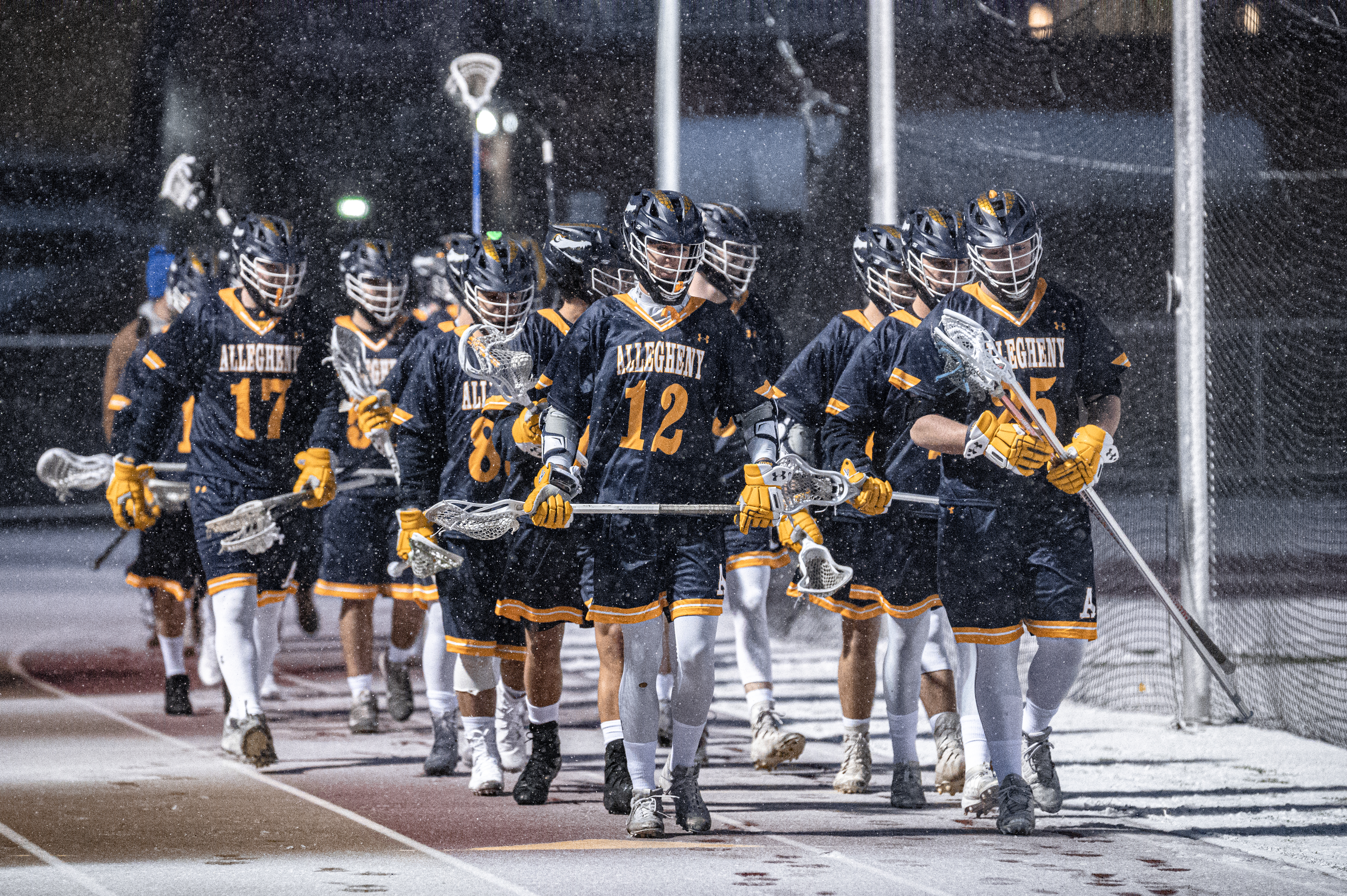
The Allegheny Gators men's lacrosse team in 2020

Allegheny, known athletically as the Gators, belongs to the Presidents' Athletic Conference (PAC) and has NCAA Division III teams. The Gators returned to the PAC in 2022 after a 38-year absence spent in the North Coast Athletic Conference (NCAC); the field hockey team remains in the NCAC because the PAC does not sponsor that sport. Men's sports are baseball, basketball, cross country, football, golf, soccer, swimming and diving, tennis, and track & field. Women's sports are basketball, cross country, golf, lacrosse, soccer, softball, swimming & diving, tennis, track & field, and volleyball. Sports facilities include the Wise Center and the Robertson Complex. 75 percent of students play intramural sports.

Branch Rickey was Allegheny College Athletic Director from 1904 to 1905, and coached baseball, basketball, and football. Rickey also served as instructor of Shakespeare, English, and History.

The 1990 Allegheny football team, led by first-year head coach Ken O'Keefe, won the Division III football national championship with a 13–0–1 record and a 21–14 victory over Lycoming in the Stagg Bowl.

=== Green Initiatives ===
Allegheny College has undertaken several projects to become more a sustainable campus. One such project is the October Energy Challenge, in which students are encouraged to save electricity for a one-month period. The difference in cost between that month and the previous month's electrical power is then reinvested back into sustainable campus infrastructure. Previous energy challenge have resulted in the addition of water-bottle stations to encourage use of reusable water bottles and solar panels on the biology building.

Other projects include the Carrden, a student-led garden that grows organic produce, multiple rain gardens, a green box program for reusable takeout containers, as well as the college itself becoming the first college in Pennsylvania to achieve Carbon Net-Neutrality

There are multiple student groups dedicated to environmental protection including SEA (Students for Environmental Action), AC Food Rescue, and Creek connections.

=== Traditions ===
One tradition is that a female student is not a "real co-ed" until she's been kissed on the thirteenth plank of the Rustic bridge over the stream. Legend states that there is a competition among residence halls during Orientation Week to steal the thirteenth plank and display it, though this rarely happens today; random students take the plank instead, with maintenance keeping a supply of replacement planks on hand.

=== Fraternities and sororities ===
Allegheny College also has a number of fraternities and sororities on campus. These include Kappa Kappa Gamma, Kappa Alpha Theta, Delta Delta Delta, Alpha Delta Pi, and Alpha Chi Omega for the sororities. The fraternities include Phi Kappa Psi, Phi Gamma Delta (FIJI), and Delta Tau Delta. In 2026, 28% of Allegheny students belonged to Greek Life on campus.https://allegheny.edu/student-life/clubs-and-organizations/fraternities-and-soroities/

== Administration ==
=== Location and transportation ===
Allegheny is located in northwestern Pennsylvania 90 miles (140 km) north of Pittsburgh, 90 miles (140 km) east of Cleveland, and 35 miles (56 km) south of Erie, in the town of Meadville, Pennsylvania.

=== Administration and staff ===
The acting president since September 2022 is Ron Cole, the college's former provost and Dean of college. There are approximately 150 administration and staff personnel in 2008. The staff breakdown is as follows: 157 full-time employees doing instruction, research, and public service; 43 executive, administrative, and managerial personnel; 103 other professionals (support/service); 9 technical and paraprofessionals; 68 clerical and secretarial employees; 12 skilled craftspersons; and 27 service & maintenance staff. In addition, part-time staff included 36 instructors, 23 other professionals, 10 secretaries, and 4 service and maintenance staff. Of the 157 full-time faculty, 87 have tenure, and 41 are on a tenure track. The average salaries of professors (in 2007) was $83K, associate professors was $63K, assistant professors was $51K, instructors was $38K. Allegheny is a member of the Higher Education Data Sharing Consortium, or HEDS, in which member institutions share information relating to improvement of higher education.
