= Bediasite =

Form of tektite

Bediasite is a form or type of tektite, which is a body of natural glass formed from earth debris during meteorite impact events. It originates in an area in the eastern part of the U.S. state of Texas centered on the small town of Bedias which is 74 miles (119 km) northwest of Houston. They are found in about nine Texas Counties in an area of over 7,000 square miles (18,000 km^{2}). The largest specimen ever found is just over 7.1 ounces (200 g).

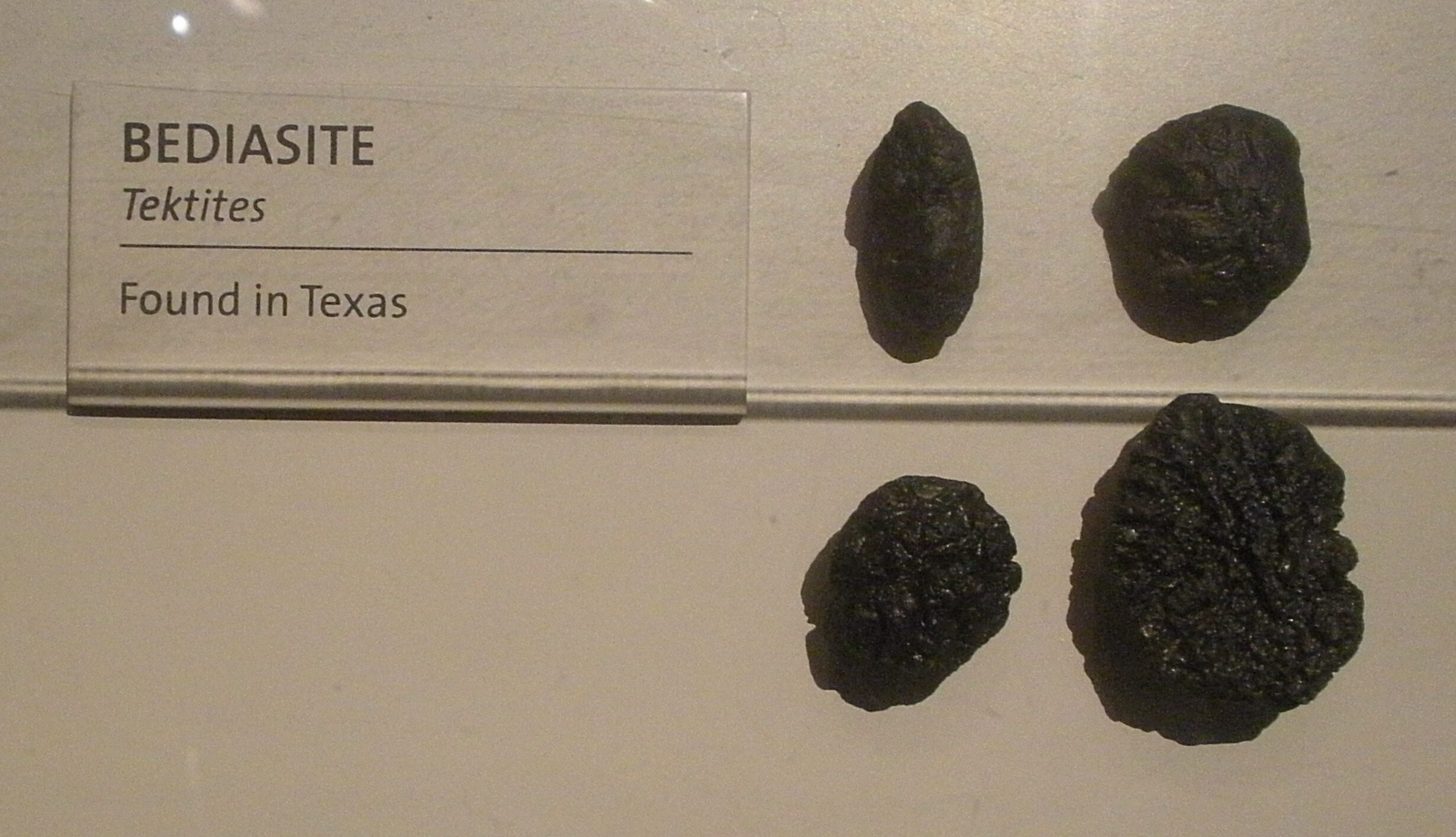
Bediasite samples at Griffith Observatory

Virgil Barnes was one of the first scientists to study Bediasites in depth. The first identified Bediasite was brought to the University of Texas at Austin in 1936 by George D. Ramsey and was identified by Virgil Barnes.

Bediasites are part of the 34-million-year-old North American strewnfield coming from the Chesapeake Bay impact crater. Two strewnfields and tektite groups are associated with this impact: the black Bediasites in Texas and the green Georgiaites in Georgia.

== Bibliography ==
- (1938). Contributions to Geology. University Of Texas, Austin.
- Koeberl, Christian, et al. (1996). "Impact Origin of the Chesapeake Bay Structure and the Source of the North American Tektites." Science 271 (1996).
- Ridpath, Ian, ed. (1997). Encyclopedia of Astronomy. Oxford: Oxford University Press.
