= North American tektite strewn field =

Debris from bolide impact in North Americ

The North American tektite strewn field is a large area, known as a strewn field, in North America defined by the presence of tektites consistent with having come from the same bolide. The field is believed to be associated with the Chesapeake Bay impact crater. Tektites from the strewn field have been dated to about 34.86 million years ago which is consistent with that of the Chesapeake Bay impact, and isotopic analysis has established a correlation between tektite material from the strewn field and material from the impact crater.
