= American Herald =

18th-century newspaper in Boston, US

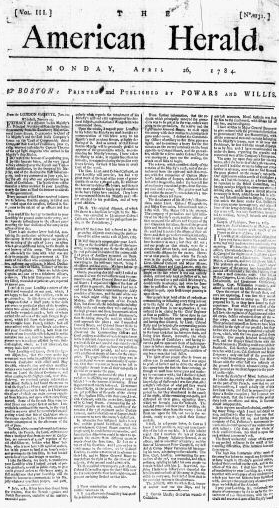
The American Herald, 1784

The American Herald (1784-1790) was a newspaper in Boston and Worcester, Massachusetts, published by Edward Eveleth Powars and Nathaniel Willis.

== Variant titles ==
- The American Herald: and the General Advertiser (Jan. 19, 1784-Mar. 29, 1784)
- The American Herald: and Federal Recorder (1788)
- American Herald; and the Worcester Recorder (1788)
- The American Herald, and the Washington Gazette (August 1790-Dec. 13, 1790)
