= Edward Eveleth Powars =

Late 18th-century American publisher

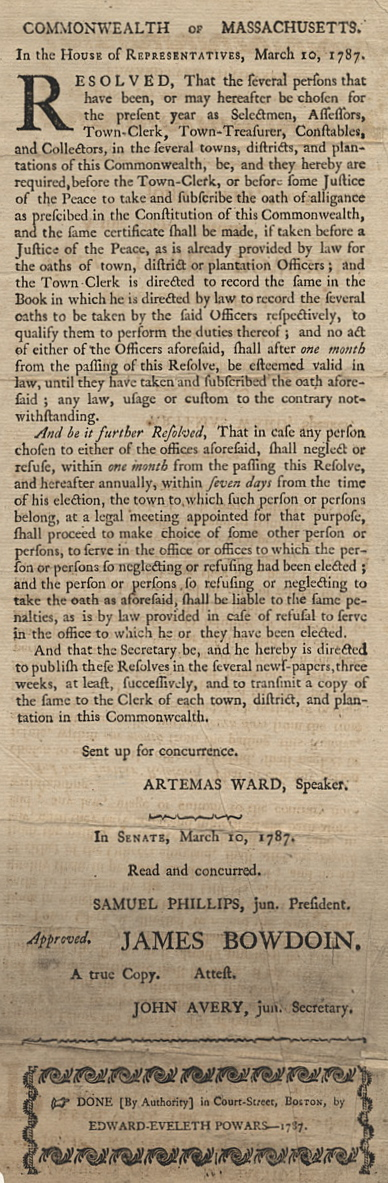
Massachusetts House of Representatives, 1787; printed by Powars, Court Street, Boston, 1787 (State Library of Massachusetts)

Edward Eveleth Powars was a printer in Boston and Worcester, Massachusetts, in the late 18th century. He published the Independent Chronicle (1776–c.1779), the Boston Evening-Post (1781–1784), the American Herald (1784–1790), and The Argus. He worked with Nathaniel Willis as "Powars & Willis."

In 1781 he kept his printing-office in Boston, at "the lower end of State-Street, over Mr. Simon Eliot's snuff-store". He moved to Worcester in 1788, "having been humiliatingly neglected ... for printing a free paper". By 1791 he had returned to Boston. Around 1796 he lived on Temple Street.

Around 1803 he worked "as a compositor in the office of Samuel Etheridge, in Charlestown". In 1813 "he held the office of Messenger to the Governor and Council of the Commonwealth."

He later became a traveling bookseller. He died on an expedition to the Western States.
