= Virginia Museum of Natural History =

Natural history museum in Martinsville, Virginia, U.S.

Coordinates: 36.6866°N 79.8633°W

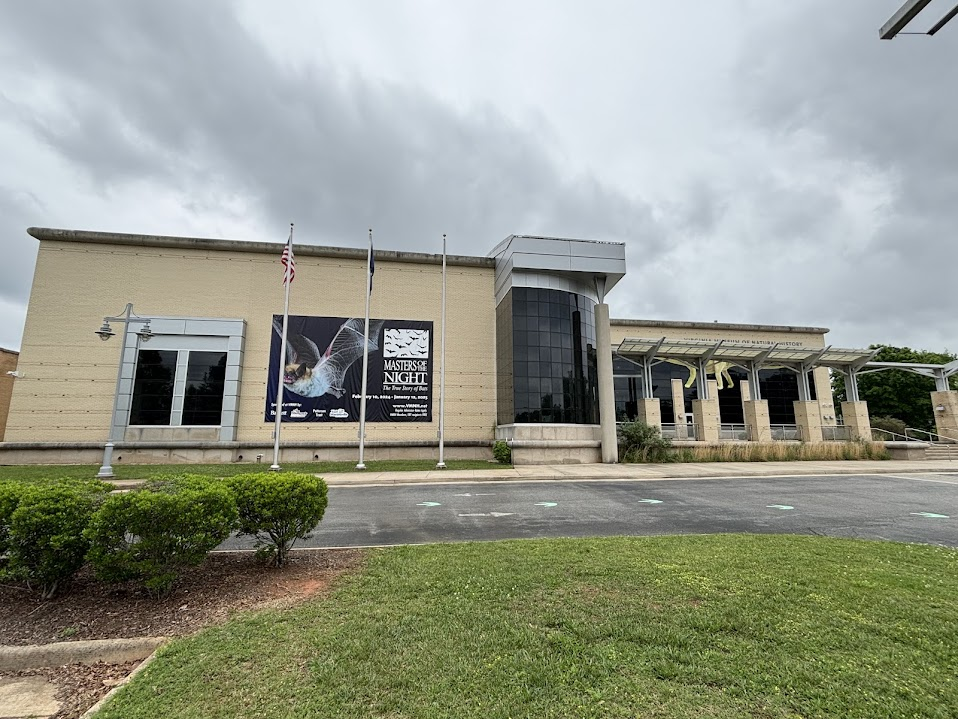
- Established: 1984
- Location: 21 Starling Avenue, Martinsville, Virginia, 24112
- Directors: Joe B. Keiper, Ph.D.
- Website: www.vmnh.net

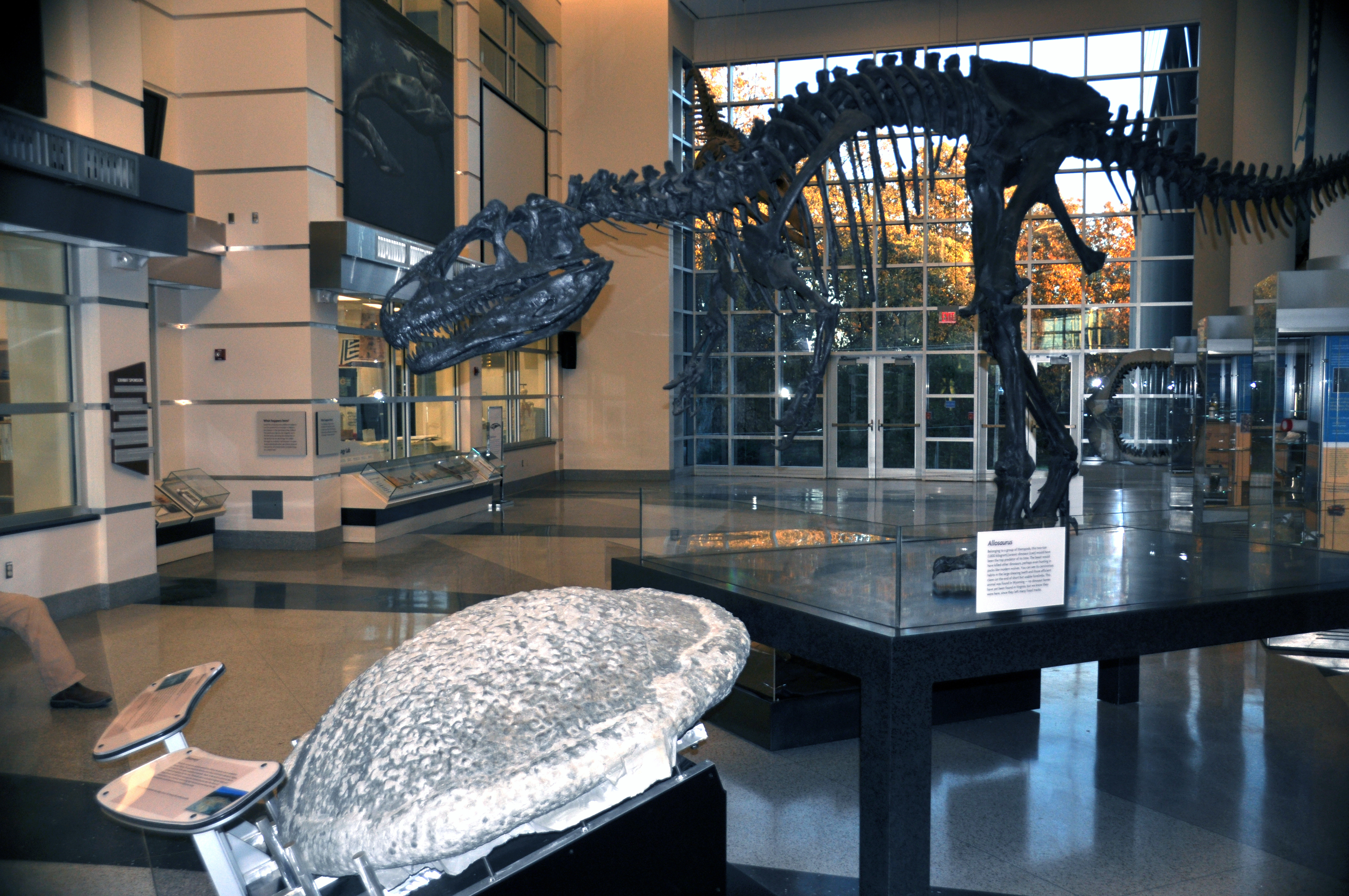
Fossil displays at the Virginia Museum of Natural History. In the foreground is a large Thrombolite-stromatolite (1.9 m diameter). In the background, the skeleton of a theropod dinosaur.

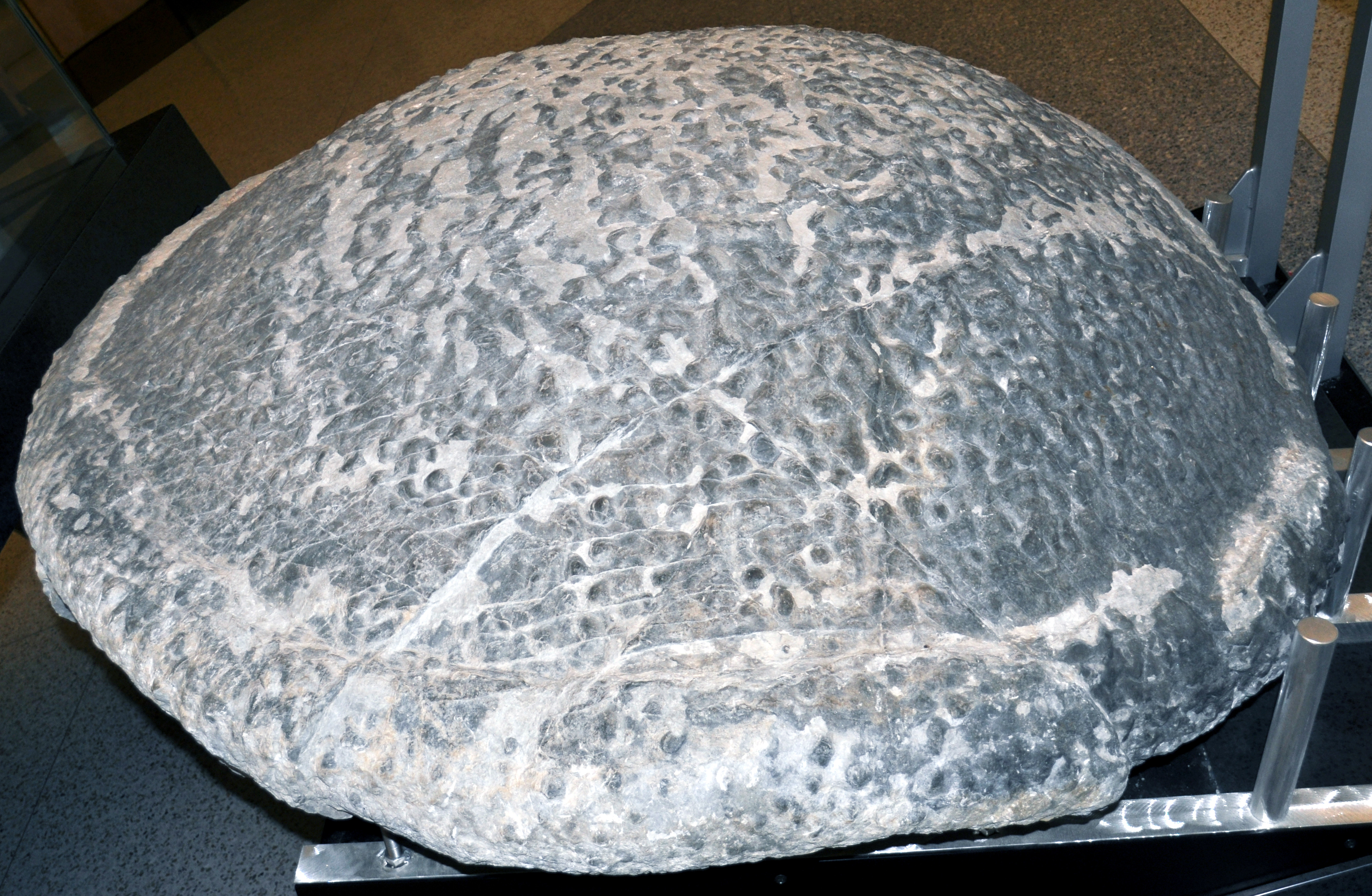
Closeup of the enormous fossil Thrombolite-stromatolite above, found in a quarry in Bedford, Virginia in 2008.

The Virginia Museum of Natural History is the state's natural history museum located in Martinsville, Virginia founded in 1984. The museum has several different award-winning publications, is affiliated with the Smithsonian Institution, and has more than 22 million items. This includes the first intact stromatolite head ever found in Virginia, which is one of the largest complete 'heads' in the world, at over 5 feet in diameter and weighing over 2 tons.

== History ==
The Virginia Museum of Natural History was founded in 1984 as The Boaz Foundation, named after Dr. Noel T. Boaz, Founding Director, along with co-founder Dr. Dorothy Dechant Boaz. The museum was founded as a private institution, but on June 2, 1985, the museum opened to the public with the new and current name. Three years later in 1988, local and statewide leaders such as Speaker of the Virginia General Assembly, A. L. Philpott, helped the museum become an agency of the Commonwealth of Virginia. The first meeting of the Board of Trustees was also held in the same year. In 1994, the museum was accredited by the American Alliance of Museums. On March 31, 2007, the new museum facility was opened at its current location. In 2010, the museum was re-accredited by the American Alliance of Museums, a high honor as fewer than 5% of the museums in America receive re-accreditation.

== Exhibits ==
=== Traveling exhibits ===
The Virginia Museum of Natural History features award-winning permanent and temporary exhibits. VMNH exhibits and items are also featured throughout the Commonwealth of Virginia in different museums, state parks, and other facilities.

=== Special exhibits ===
VMNH hosts a variety of temporary exhibits focusing on different topics throughout the year. The current special exhibit, Exploring Virginia, is open through June 11, 2017. The exhibit highlights how archaeologists study the past through investigation and interpretation.

The special exhibit to open after Exploring Virginia is Dinosaurs, opening Friday, July 21 at 9 a.m.

=== Permanent exhibits ===
==== The Harvest Foundation Hall of Ancient Life ====
The Harvest Foundation Hall of Ancient Life welcomes visitors as they enter to the museum pass the ticket booth. The museum website offers this account regarding the exhibit hall: "Visitors are greeted by the enormous skeleton of an Allosaurus dinosaur, while a skeleton of a 14 million-year-old baleen whale hangs beneath a vaulted ceiling of skylights. Windows offer a peek into the museum's active laboratories where researchers and volunteers work, and award-winning displays and graphic presentations greet visitors at every turn." Along with the Allosaurus and Eobalaenoptera, visitors can see a Pteranodon and Stromatolite. Visitors can also see six column cases that feature special exhibits on a rotating basis. Stories From Skeletons is currently on display in these cases.

==== Uncovering Virginia ====
The museum website states, "Uncovering Virginia features recreations of six research sites in Virginia where VMNH scientists and their colleagues have worked or are working. There is a range of geographic locations around the Commonwealth that span a broad interval of time from 700 million years ago to 300 years ago. At each exhibit, there is: a recreation of the site as it is today; a lab experience where visitors can examine fossil or archaeological evidence and use the same tools as scientists to interpret that evidence; and video animation that brings to life the animals and plants that were alive at that time and in at that place."

==== How Nature Works ====
"The Lee & George W. Lester, II How Nature Works gallery demonstrates how energy from within the Earth's crust and energy from the sun have shaped the Earth as we know it today. Visitors view and interact with the exhibits to better understand the magnificent forces and processes that have helped create the world today," states the museum website.

==== The Hahn Hall of Biodiversity ====
Information for this gallery can be found on the museum website:"The Hahn Hall of Biodiversity opened to the public in August 2010.The Hahn Hall of Biodiversity features the spectacular African mammal collections of Dr. Thomas Marshall Hahn Jr., President Emeritus of Virginia Tech. Dr. Hahn generously donated his extensive collections to VMNH for the enjoyment and education of countless future visitors of all ages."

==== Fossil Overlook ====
From the museum's website: "the museum's Fossil Overlook is a new prehistoric life exhibit that includes a variety of fossils, detailed models, casts, and interactive multi-media programs for visitors of all ages. This new exhibit is located on the museum's upper-level."

==== Hooker Furniture Discovery Reef ====
This exhibit opened to the public in 2010 and is an interactive play area for children ages 8 and under.

==== Three Cultures, Three Stories ====
This is an interactive online exhibit featured on the museum's website that showcases the cultures of three North American Native American tribes: the Pueblo, Powhattan, and Lakota.

== Research and collections ==
The Virginia Museum of Natural History is known for its research on Invertebrate Paleontology, Vertebrate Paleontology, Recent Invertebrates, Archaeology, Mammalogy, Marine Science, and Earth Science. These researchers can draw information from over 10 million cataloged items or specimens in the VMNH collections.

== Education ==
The VMNH has many programs for students and teachers. Throughout the year, the museum has many programs that include activities, games, and crafts for children. The museum also hosts sleepovers and is available for birthday parties or other events. Children can also participate in the museum's Boy and Girl Scouts program. During the summer, the museum offers fun and educational Adventure Camps for young students. The VMNH is also involved in the community by providing service to the MHC After 3 Program, a program created to give children a safe place to go after school and to improve children's math and other skills. Through the outreach program, educators visit schools and community sites to present natural history to students hands-on activities. Teachers are also trained by the museum in programs such as VSSI, VSISE: Virginia Science Institute for STEM Education, GLOBE: Global Learning and Observation to Benefit the Environment, and Trout in the Classroom.
