= Independent Chronicle =

Newspaper in Boston, Massachusetts

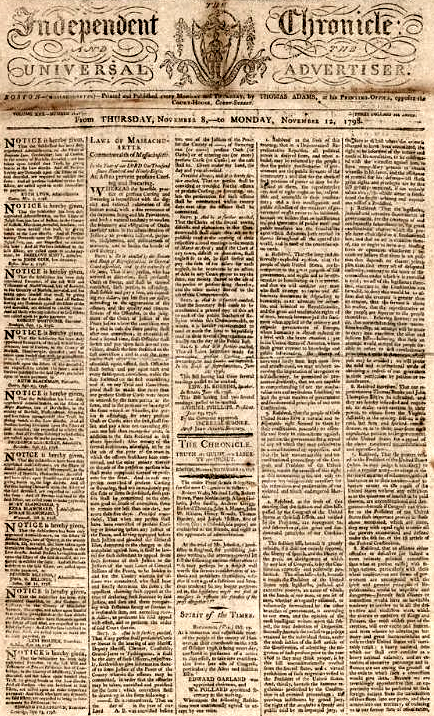
The Independent Chronicle and the Universal Advertiser (Boston: 1798)

The Independent Chronicle (1776–1840) was a newspaper in Boston, Massachusetts. It originated in 1768 as The Essex Gazette, founded by Samuel Hall (v.1–7) in Salem, and The New-England Chronicle (v.7–9) in Cambridge, before settling in 1776 in Boston as The Independent Chronicle. Publishers also included Edward E. Powars, Nathaniel Willis, and Adams & Rhoades; Capt. Thomas Adams (ca.1757–1799) was the editor prior to his death in 1799. For some time it operated from offices on Court Street formerly occupied by James Franklin. As of the 1820s, "the Chronicle [was] the oldest newspaper ... published in Boston; and has long been considered one of the principal republican papers in the state; and its influence has, at all times, been in exact proportion to the popularity of the cause which it has so warmly espoused." After 1840 the paper continued as the Boston Semi-weekly Advertiser published by Nathan Hale.

== Variant titles ==
Volumes 1–9

- The Essex Gazette (Salem): Vol. 1, no. 1 (Aug. 2, 1768)-v. 7, no. 353 (Apr. 25 – May 2, 1775)
- The New-England Chronicle, or, the Essex Gazette (Cambridge): Vol. 7, no. 354 (May 2–12, 1775)-v. 8, no. 400 (Mar. 28-Apr. 4, 1776)
- The New-England Chronicle (Boston): Vol. 8, no. 401 (Apr. 25, 1776)-v. 9, no. 411 [i.e. 421] (Sept. 12, 1776)

Volumes 9–77

- The Independent Chronicle: Vol. 9, no. 422 (Sept. 19, 1776)-v. 9, no. 428 (Oct. 31, 1776)
- The Independent Chronicle and the Universal Advertiser: Vol. 9, no. 429 (Nov. 7, 1776)-v. 33, no. 2162 (Dec. 14–17, 1801)
- The Independent Chronicle: Vol. 33, no. 2163 (Dec. 21, 1801)-v. 49, no. 3768 (May 29, 1817)
- Independent Chronicle & Boston Patriot: Vol. 49, no. 3769 (June 4, 1817)-v. 77, no. 6166 (May 23, 1840)

== Image gallery ==
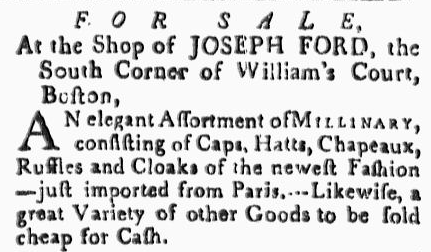
Ad for "millinary, consisting of caps, hatts, chapeaux, ruffles and cloaks of the newest fashion-- just imported from Paris," Feb. 1782

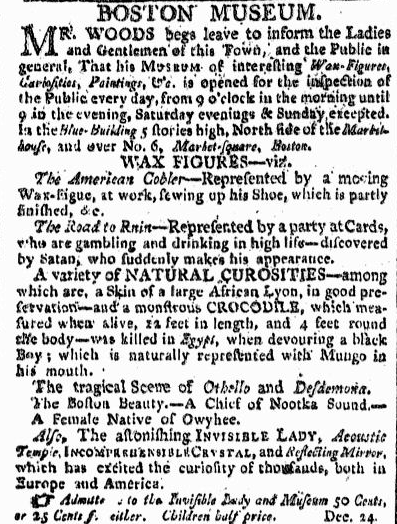
Advertisement for Phillip Woods' Market Museum, 1804

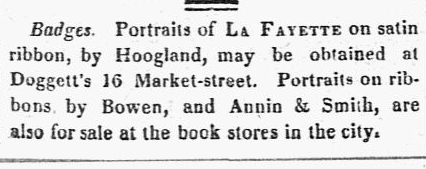
"Badges. Portraits of La Fayette on satin ribbon, by Hoogland, may be obtained at Doggett's 16 Market-street. Portraits on ribbons by Bowen, and Annin & Smith, are also for sale at the book stores in the city," August 1824

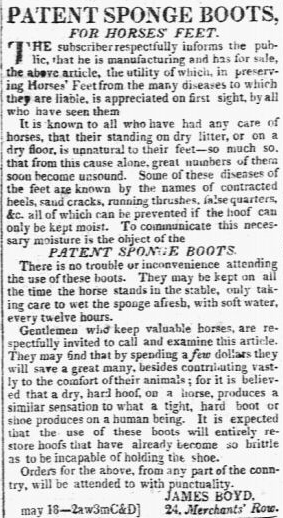
Advertisement for sponge boots for horses' feet, James Boyd, Merchants Row, Boston, 1825

== See also ==
- Abijah Adams, a journalist for the newspaper
- Columbian Centinel
- Early American publishers and printers
- Bibliography of early American publishers and printers
