= Bentley Hall =

- U.S. National Register of Historic Places
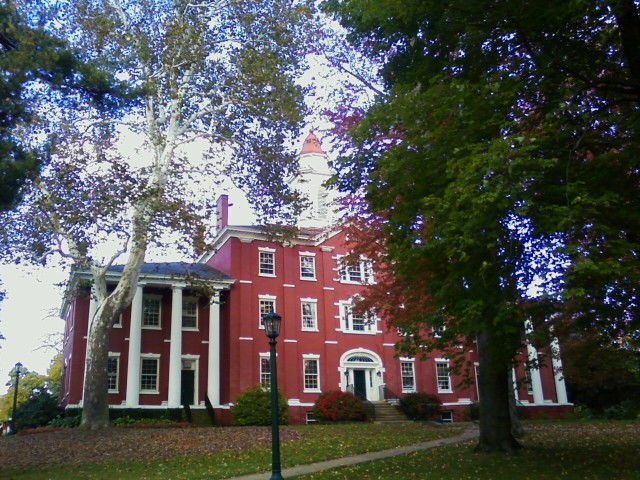
- Bentley Hall, October 2009

- Location within Pennsylvania Location within the United States
- Location: Allegheny College campus, Meadville, Pennsylvania
- Coordinates: 41°38′55″N 80°8′51″W
- Area: 0.5 acres (0.20 ha)
- Built: 1820-1835
- Built by: Alden, Rev., Timothy
- Architectural style: Colonial, Greek Revival
- NRHP reference No.: 77001156
- Added to NRHP: May 6, 1977

Bentley Hall is a historic building located on the campus of Allegheny College at Meadville, Crawford County, Pennsylvania. It was built between 1820 and 1835, and is a vernacular brick and stone building with a Federal style center building and Greek Revival style wings. The central section measures three stories and 60 feet wide and the two-story wings are 30 feet wide each. It is topped by a distinctive cupola. It was the first building built on the Allegheny College campus, and the only building until Ruter Hall was built in 1853. It is named for Rev. William Bentley, an early benefactor.

It was added to the National Register of Historic Places in 1977.
