= Salem Register =

19th-century newspaper in Salem, Massachusetts, U.S.

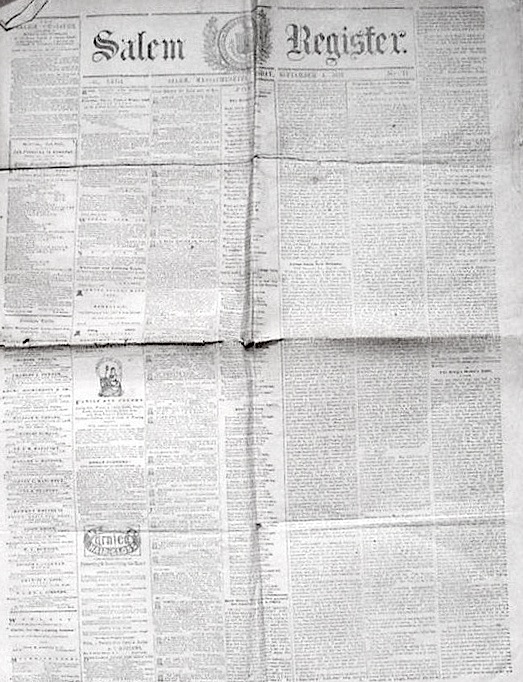
Salem Register, 1862

The Salem Register (1800-c. 1911) was a newspaper published in Salem, Massachusetts, in the 19th century. William Carlton established it in 1800; subsequent publishers included his wife Elizabeth Carlton, John Chapman, Charles W. Palfray, Warick Palfray Jr., Haven Poole, Eben N. Walton. Among the contributing writers: William Bentley, Andrew Dunlap, Joseph E. Sprague, Joseph Story. Its office was at no. 185 Essex Street.

In the 1800s the Register "began its career as an advocate for the election of Mr. Jefferson to the presidency. With all the ability of its editor and his friends -- among whom were the Rev. William Bentley and some of the wealthiest families in Salem -- it opposed the doctrines and the measures of the federal party. The political warfare between the Register and the Salem Gazette was carried on with great vigor and bitterness."

From 1807 to 1840 the paper was called the Essex Register, then again called the Salem Register. "The reason for altering the title from Essex to Salem was that letters and packages directed to their office were carried to the town of Essex and thus caused considerable inconvenience." In the 1820s-1830s, "prior to the amalgamation of distinct parties in politics under the names of Whig and Democrat the Register sustained those who called themselves Republicans."

== Variant titles ==
- The Impartial Register, 1800-1800
- Salem Impartial Register, 1800-1801
- Salem Register, 1802-1807, 1841-1903, 1906-c. 1911
- Essex Register, 1807-1840
- Salem Register and Essex County Mercury, 1903-1906
