= Salem Gazette =

Weekly American newspaper

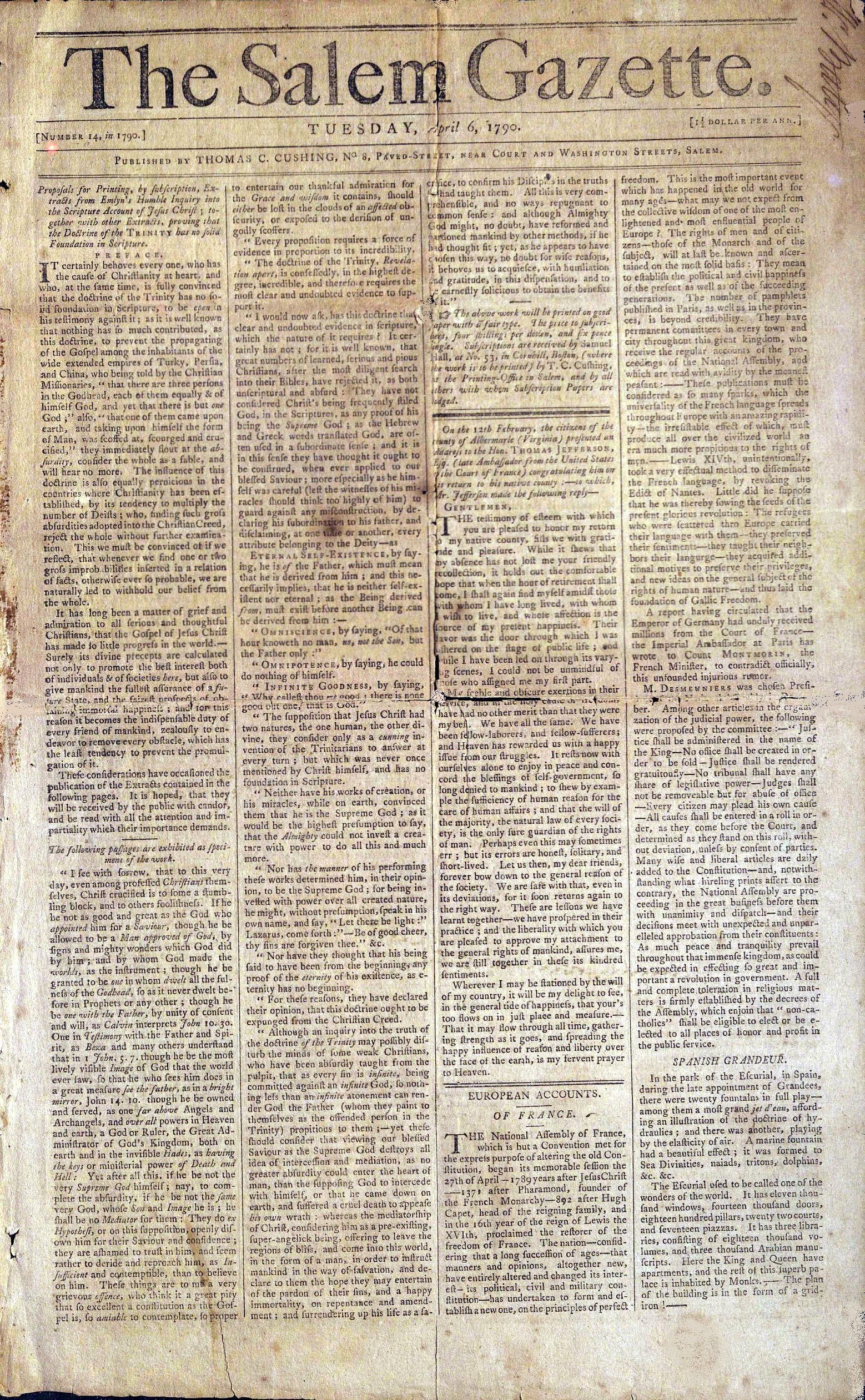
- Salem Gazette, April 6, 1790 issue
- Type: Weekly Newspaper
- Owner: USA Today Co.
- Publisher: Thomas C. Cushing
- Founded: Jan. 5, 1790
- Headquarters: Beverly, Massachusetts
- Circulation: 13,000
- Price: Free weekly
- Website: salem.wickedlocal.com

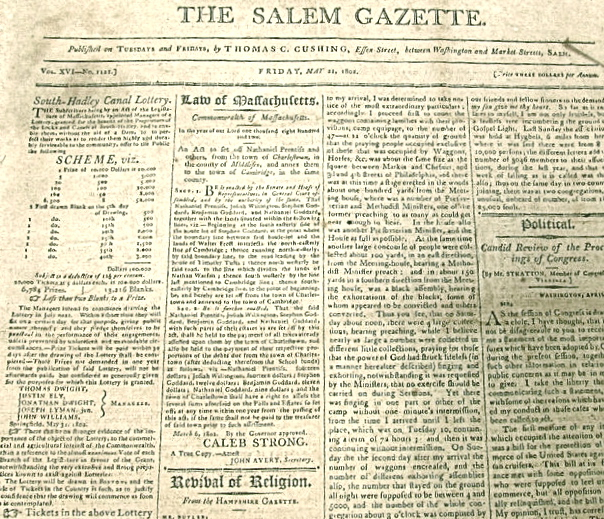
Salem Gazette, 1802

The Salem Gazette is an American newspaper serving Salem residents. The weekly newspaper comes out on Fridays. The Salem Gazette, first published on January 5, 1790, used to be known as the Salem Mercury, and briefly The American Eagle. The first issue of the Salem Gazette is technically the only issue of The American Eagle published.

Thomas C. Cushing was the original publisher of the Salem Gazette, however he relinquished the publication to William Carleton on October 14, 1794. The next issue of the Gazette contains a few words from the new publisher and a special section from Rev. William Bentley, an outspoken columnist known at the time for his eccentric, but unspotted character in writing.

== History ==
The Salem Mercury was a newspaper that was published by John Dabney and Thomas Cushing. It began production around 1786 and ended in 1790 after the name of the paper was changed. It printed weekly on Tuesday onto demy sheet, four columns to a page, and predominantly on Long Primer type. Editors took great care in ensuring the intellectual quality of the content published. The editors were ardent friends to the Union of the States and advocates for the US Constitution.

The first paper then issued by Cushing in 1790 had the title The American Eagle, and was designated as "Number 1, in 1790." The next paper was entitled "The Salem Gazette, Number 2 in 1790." This numbering pattern and name continued until the beginning of 1791, where the numbering was changed to contain the full number of issues since the first number of the Mercury. The name Salem Gazette continues to this day.

In June, 1796, the Gazette was published as a semi-weekly paper on Tuesday and Friday. Cushing resumed publication of the Gazette on July 25, 1797. William Bentley's columns were never published again, most likely due to political tensions between Cushing and Carleton.

Thomas Cushing left the paper in 1822 due to poor health and relinquished the paper to Caleb Cushing and Ferdinand Andrews. Five years later, Caleb Cushing departed, leaving the paper under the sole ownership of Ferdinand Andrews, who later sold the paper to Caleb Foote.

In 2006, the Salem Gazette was resurrected under the banner of GateHouse Media, and currently operates as a free weekly newspaper focusing on culture, daily life and human interest in Salem. New editions of the paper are distributed on Fridays. The paper prints approximately 13,000 copies per week. The first editor of the new Salem Gazette was Bill Woolley.

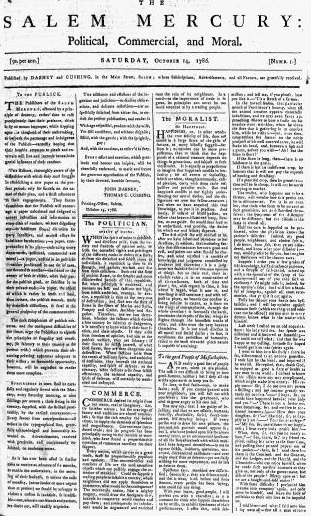
Salem Mercury, 1786

== See also ==
- The Essex Gazette, Salem's first newspaper
- Samuel Hall, first printer and newspaper editor of Salem
