= Iowa's 13th Senate district =

American legislative district

Iowa's 13th State Senate district
Senator
Cherielynn Westrich; R

The 13th District of the Iowa Senate is located in southern Iowa, and is currently composed of Davis, Monroe and Wapello Counties, and portions of Appanoose County.

== Current elected officials ==
Cherielynn Westrich is the senator currently representing the 13th District.

The area of the 13th District contains two Iowa House of Representatives districts:

- The 25th District (represented by Hans Wilz)
- The 26th District (represented by Austin Harris)

The district is also located in Iowa's 3rd congressional district, which is represented by U.S. Representative Zach Nunn.

== List of representatives ==
Representative	Party	Dates	Residence	Notes
Samuel Bissell	Democrat	1846-1847	Cedar County	
John Parsons Cook	Whig	1848-1851	Tipton, Iowa	
Joseph Lowe	Democrat	1852-1853	Springfield, Iowa	
James Hogin	Whig	1854-1855	Sigourney, Iowa	
Hiram Cleaver	Republican	1856-1857	Louisa County	
Samuel Reiner	Republican	1858-1861	Louisa County	
James Hurley	Republican	1862-1863	Wapello, Iowa	
William Castlebury Shippen	Republican	1864-1867	Monroe County	
Augustus Hamilton	Republican	1868-1871	Ottumwa, Iowa	
Joseph Merrill	Republican	1872-1877	Ottumwa, Iowa	
Gregg Madison	Democrat	1878-1881	Ottumwa, Iowa	
Joseph Hutchison	Republican	1882-1885	Ottumwa, Iowa	
James Dooley	Democrat	1886-1887	What Cheer, Iowa	
Joseph Hutchison	Republican	1888-1889	Ottumwa, Iowa	
Peter Ballingall	Democrat	1890-1891	Ottumwa, Iowa	Senator Ballingall "died while on an ocean voyage, near the port of Hong Kong, on his second trip around the world" while in office in 1891.
James Joseph Smith	Republican	1892-1893	Ottumwa, Iowa	
Harrison Waterman	Republican	1894-1897	Ottumwa, Iowa	
William Anderson McIntire	Democrat	1898-1901	Ottumwa, Iowa	
Samuel Houston Harper	Republican	1902-1906	Ottumwa, Iowa	
Edwin Moon	Democrat	1907-1910	Ottumwa, Iowa	
John Francis Webber	Democrat	1911-1914	Ottumwa, Iowa	
Chester Whitmore	Republican	1915-1922	Ottumwa, Iowa	
Frank Shane	Republican	1923-1930	Ottumwa, Iowa	
Roy E. Stevens	Democrat	1931-1938	Ottumwa, Iowa	
Elmer Bekman	Republican	1939-1954	Ottumwa, Iowa	
Samuel Burton	Democrat	1955-1958	Ottumwa, Iowa	
Jacob Mincks	Democrat	1959-1962	Ottumwa, Iowa	
	1963-1964			No senator from district 13 is listed on the Iowa Official Register for General Assembly 60. This is the combined result of redistricting and election cycles and affected multiple districts.
Joseph Flatt	Republican	1965-1966	Winterset, Iowa	
Thomas Frey	Republican	1967-1970	Pottawattamie County	In 1964, after previous amendments to the Iowa Constitution were determined to violate the 14th Amendment, an interim plan increased the number of senators and representatives in the state by apportioning additional senators and representatives to the most populous districts/counties. This plan existed from 1965 to 1970, when a new districting and apportionment plan was adopted.
Gilbert Klefstad	Democrat	1967-1968	Council Bluffs, Iowa	
James W. Griffin	Republican	1969-1970	Council Bluffs, Iowa	
John Wesley Graham	Republican	1971-1972	Ida Grove, Iowa	
Tom Riley	Republican	1973-1974	Cedar Rapids, Iowa	
James Redmond	Democrat	1975-1978	Cedar Rapids, Iowa	
Arthur Kudart	Republican	1979-1982	Linn County	
Thomas Lind	Republican	1983-1986	Waterloo, Iowa	Senator Lind died while in office in 1986 and was succeeded by his son, Jim Lind.
Jim Lind	Republican	1987-1997	Waterloo, Iowa	Senator Lind resigned from office in 1997.
Patricia Harper	Democrat	1998-2002	Black Hawk County	
Roger Stewart	Democrat	2003-2010	Jackson County	
Tod Bowman	Democrat	2011-2012	Maquoketa, Iowa	
Kent Sorenson	Republican	2013	Milo, Iowa	Senator Sorenson resigned in 2013 after pleading guilty to obstruction of justice and other felonies related to campaign finances.
Julian Garrett	Republican	2014-2022	Warren County	
Cherielynn Westrich	Republican	2023-present	Wapello County	

== Historical district boundaries ==
Map	Description	Years effective	Notes
	Benton County Cedar County; Linn County	1846-1849	From 1846 to 1857, district numbering was not utilized by the Iowa State Legislature. This convention was added with the passing of the 1857 Iowa Constitution. Numbering of districts pre-1857 is done as a matter of historic convenience.
	Benton County Cedar County; Linn County; Tama County	1850-1851	
	Keokuk County	1852-1855	
	Louisa County	1856-1863	
	Monroe County	1864-1867	
	Wapello County	1868-1885	
	Iowa County Keokuk County	1886-1887	
	Wapello County	1888-1962	
	Adair County Clarke County; Madison County	1963-1966	
	Pottawattamie County	1967-1970	
	Calhoun County (partial) Cherokee County; Ida County; Sac County	1971-1972	In 1970, the Iowa Legislature passed an amendment to the Iowa Constitution setting forth the rules for legislative redistricting in order to abide by the rules established by the Reynolds v. Sims Supreme Court case. The first reapportionment map created by the Republican controlled legislature was deemed unconstitutional, but was still used for the 1970 election.
	Johnson County (partial) Linn County	1973-1982	
	Black Hawk County (partial)	1983-1992	
	Black Hawk County (partial)	1993-2002	
	Clinton County (partial): Bloomfield Township; Brookfield Township; Center Township; Deep Creek Township; Elk River Township; Hampshire Township; Waterford Township; Andover; Charlotte; Clinton; Delmar; Goose Lake; Dubuque County (partial): Mosalem Township; Table Mound Township; Washington Township; Jackson County	2003-2012	
	Madison County Warren County (partial): Excluding; Linn Township (partial); Cumming	2013-2022	
	Appanoose County (partial): Excluding; Independence Township; Johns Township; Lincoln Township; Plano; Davis County; Monroe County; Wapello County	2023-present	

== See also ==
- Iowa General Assembly
- Iowa Senate
