= Davenport–Moline combined statistical area =

Greater Quad Cities CSA
- CSA
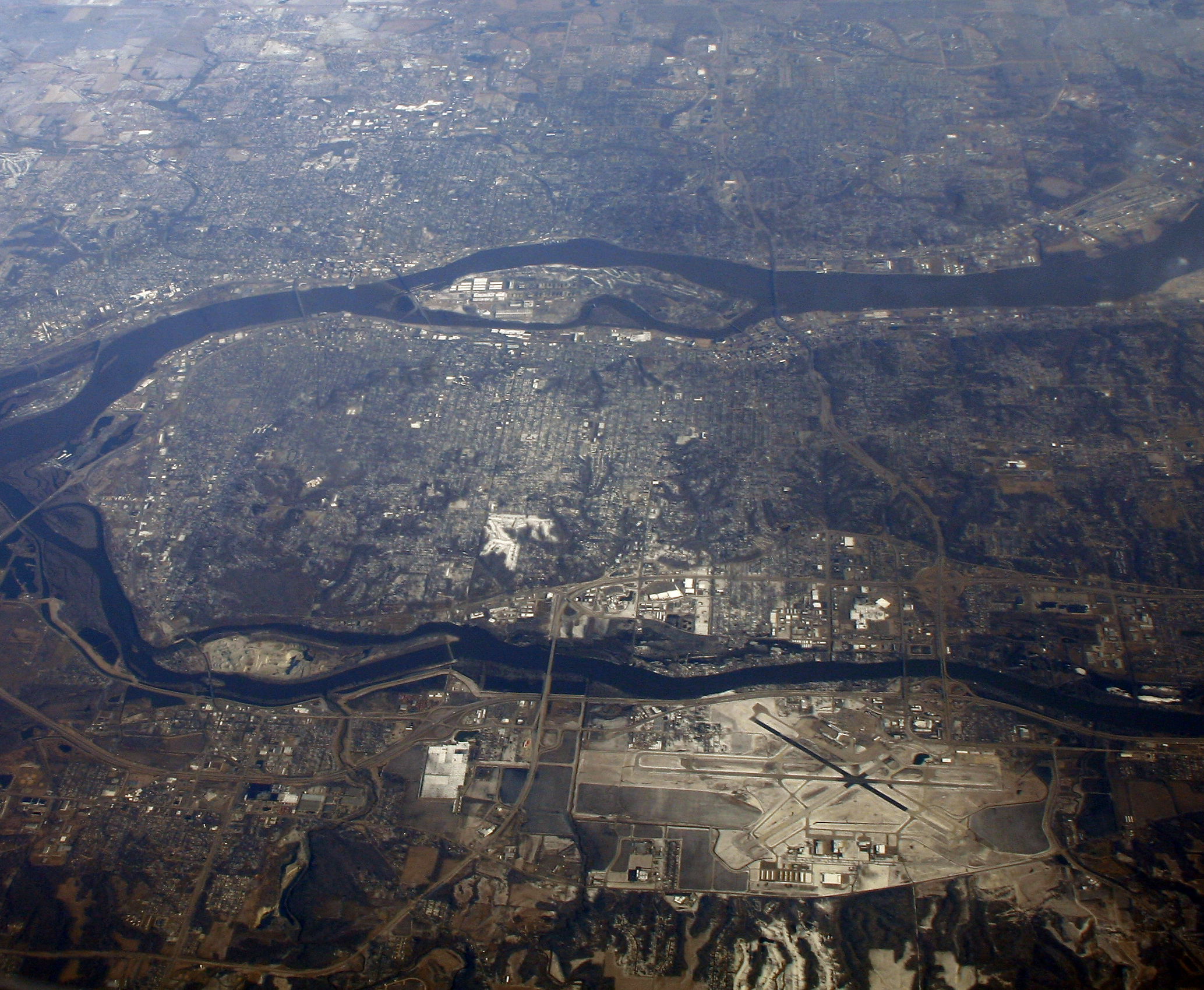
- Aerial view of the Quad Cities
Map of Davenport–Moline, IA–IL CSA
City of Davenport, IA
City of Bettendorf, IA
City of Moline, IL
City of Rock Island, IL
Davenport–Moline–Rock Island, IA–IL MSA
Muscatine, IA µSA
Clinton, IA µSA
- Country: United States
- State: Iowa; Illinois
- Largest city: Davenport, Iowa
- Other cities: Moline, Illinois; Bettendorf, Iowa; Rock Island, Illinois; East Moline, Illinois

Area
  - Total: 170 sq mi (440 km^{2})
- Highest elevation: 850 ft (259 m)
- Lowest elevation: 590 ft (180 m)

Population
  - Total: 379,374 (147th)
  - Rank: 147th in the U.S.
  - Density: 1,600/sq mi (618/km^{2})
- Time zone: UTC-06:00 (CST)
  - Summer (DST): UTC-05:00 (CDT)

Greater Quad Cities, IA–IL is a nickname for the Davenport–Moline, IA–IL Combined Statistical Area, an area that is made up of four counties in Iowa and three in Illinois. The statistical area includes one metropolitan areas and two micropolitan areas. As of the 2010 Census, the CSA had a population of 471,551 (though a March 2017 estimate placed the population at 472,153).

The area consists of the:

- Quad Cities Metropolitan Area, population 383,681
- Clinton, IA Micropolitan Statistical Area, population 48,420
- Muscatine, Iowa micropolitan area, population 54,118

== Counties ==
=== In Iowa ===
- Scott County pop. 170,385
- Clinton County pop. 48,420
- Muscatine County pop. 42,836
- Louisa County pop. 11,282

=== In Illinois ===
- Rock Island County pop. 147,258
- Henry County pop. 49,860
- Mercer County pop. 16,178

== Communities ==
The communities (both incorporated and unincorporated) in the combined statistical area are as follows:

In Iowa

- Davenport
- Andover
- Bettendorf
- Blue Grass
- Bryant
- Buffalo
- Calamus
- Camanche
- Charlotte
- Clinton
- Columbus City
- Columbus Junction
- Cotter
- Cranston
- Creekville
- Delmar
- DeWitt
- Dixon
- Donahue
- Eldridge
- Elvira
- Elwood
- Fairport
- Fredonia
- Goose Lake
- Grand Mound
- Grandview
- Le Claire
- Letts
- Long Grove
- Lost Nation
- Low Moor
- Maysville
- McCausland
- Midway Beach
- Montpelier
- Morning Sun
- Moscow
- Mount Joy
- Muscatine
- New Liberty
- Oakville
- Panorama Park
- Park View
- Petersburg
- Princeton
- Riverdale
- Teeds Grove
- Toolesboro
- Toronto
- Walcott
- Wapello
- Welton
- West Liberty
- Wheatland
- Wilton

In Illinois

- Moline
- Aledo
- Annawan
- Barstow
- Cambridge
- Carbon Cliff
- Cleveland
- Coal Valley
- Dayton
- East Moline
- Geneseo
- Hampton
- Kewanee
- Lynn Center
- Matherville
- Milan
- Nekoma
- North Henderson
- Ophiem
- Orion
- Osco
- Port Byron
- Rock Island
- Sherrard
- Silvis

== Education institutes ==
=== Higher education ===
Eastern Iowa Community Colleges

== Transportation ==
=== Airports ===
Below is a list of the airports in the greater area, followed by their number of enplanements (commercial passenger boardings) that occurred at the airport in calendar year 2013.

==== Public ====
- Quad City International Airport (IATA: MLI, ICAO: KMLI, FAA LID: MLI), 49,170
- Davenport Municipal Airport (IATA: DVN, ICAO: KDVN, FAA LID: DVN), 28,251
- Muscatine Municipal Airport (IATA: MUT, ICAO: KMUT, FAA LID: MUT), 14,106
- Clinton Municipal Airport (IATA: CWI, ICAO: KCWI, FAA LID: CWI), 14,106

=== Transit ===
- Bettendorf Transit
- Clinton Municipal Transit Administration
- Davenport Citibus
- MuscaBus
- Quad Cities MetroLINK
- River Bend Transit

=== Interstates ===
- Interstate 80
- Interstate 74
- Interstate 88
- Interstate 280

=== Principal Highways ===
- U.S. Highway 30
- U.S. Highway 61
- U.S. Highway 67
- U.S. Highway 6
- U.S. Highway 150

=== State Highways ===
- Iowa State Route 22
- Iowa State Route 38
- Iowa State Route 70
- Iowa State Route 78
- Iowa State Route 92
- Iowa State Route 130
- Iowa State Route 136
- Illinois State Route 5
- Illinois State Route 17
- Illinois State Route 78
- Illinois State Route 81
- Illinois State Route 82
- Illinois State Route 84
- Illinois State Route 92
- Illinois State Route 93
- Illinois State Route 94
- Illinois State Route 192

== Shopping ==
Below are some notable shopping centers in the area:

- NorthPark Mall (Davenport, Iowa)
- SouthPark Mall (Moline, Illinois)
- Muscatine Mall (Muscatine, Iowa)
