= List of churches in the Diocese of Davenport =

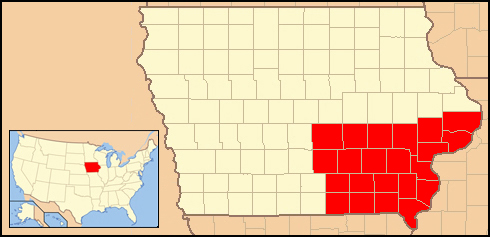
Diocese of Davenport in red

This is a list of current and former churches in the Roman Catholic Diocese of Davenport, in the U.S. state of Iowa. The diocese includes 80 churches located throughout southeastern Iowa. The cathedral church of the diocese is Sacred Heart Cathedral in Davenport. This list also includes two university chapels.

== Burlington Deanery ==
Name	Image	Location	Description/Notes
St. John the Baptist		Burlington	St. John's founded 1852; Built 1883–1885; listed on the National Register of Historic Places (NRHP); Now in Divine Mercy Parish, founded 2017
St. Paul		Burlington	St. Paul's founded 1839; Built 1892–1855; listed on NRHP; Now in Divine Mercy Parish, founded 2017
St. Mary		Dodgeville	Founded 1850; Built 1904; Divine Mercy Parish
St. Mary		Fairfield	Founded 1857; Built 2009
St. Boniface		Farmington	Founded 1863
Sacred Heart		Fort Madison	Founded 1893; Built 1900; Holy Family Parish, founded in 2009
Ss. Mary & Joseph		Fort Madison	Founded as St. Mary of the Assumption 1839; Built 1866–1870; listed on NRHP; Now in Holy Family Parish, founded in 2009
St. John the Baptist		Houghton	Founded 1895; Built 1951
All Saints		Keokuk	Founded as St. Peter's Parish 1839; Built 1879–1885; listed on NRHP; All Saints founded in 1982
St. Joseph		Montrose	Founded 1860; Built 1969
St. Alphonsus		Mount Pleasant	Founded 1857; Built 2005
St. James the Less		St. Paul	Founded 1838; Built 1892
St. Mary		West Burlington	Founded 1886; Built 1916; Now in Divine Mercy Parish, founded 2017
St. Mary of the Assumption		West Point	Founded 1841; Built 1863

== Clinton Deanery ==
Name	Image	Location	Description/Notes
Visitation		Camanche	Founded 1967; Built 1970
Assumption & St. Patrick		Charlotte	Founded 1882 as Assumption Parish; Built 1882; St. Patrick, Villa Nova was a separate parish founded in 1852. The two parish were merged at Charlotte in the 1990s.
Jesus Christ, Prince of Peace		Clinton	Founded 1990; Built 2007–2009; The parish is a merger of the five parishes in Clinton.
St. Patrick		Delmar	Founded 1880; Built 1928
St. Joseph		DeWitt	Founded 1850 as Ss. Simon & Jude Parish; Built 1880
Ss. Philip & James		Grand Mound	Founded 1857; Built 1969
Our Lady of the River		LeClaire	Founded 1969 as a merger of St. James in Princeton and St. Henry in LeClaire; Built 1979
St. Ann		Long Grove	Founded 1840; Built 1984-1985
Sacred Heart		Lost Nation	Founded 1895; Built 1965–1966; Now in Our Lady of the Holy Rosary Parish
St. Mary		Mechanicsville	Founded 1857; Built 1969
Immaculate Conception		Petersville	Founded 1853; Built 1904
St. Joseph		Sugar Creek	Founded 1855; Built 1896
St. Mary		Tipton	Founded 1855; Built 1969
St. James		Toronto	Founded 1855; Built 1883; Now in Our Lady of the Holy Rosary Parish
St. Bernadette		West Branch	Founded 1856; Built 1960

== Davenport Deanery ==
Name	Image	Location	Description/Notes
Our Lady of Lourdes		Bettendorf	Founded 1902; Built 1963
St. John Vianney		Bettendorf	Founded 1867; Built 1970
St. Andrew		Blue Grass	Founded 1976; Built 1990-1991
St. Peter		Buffalo	Founded 1859; Built 1867
Christ the King		Davenport	Built 1952–1953; Renovated 2006; Chapel at St. Ambrose University
Holy Family		Davenport	Founded 1897; Built 1909
Our Lady of Victory		Davenport	Founded 1967; Built 1967-1968
Sacred Heart Cathedral		Davenport	Founded 1856 as St. Margaret's Parish; Built 1889–1891; listed on NRHP
St. Alphonsus		Davenport	Founded 1908; Built 1912-1913
St. Anthony		Davenport	Founded 1837; Built 1850–1853; listed on NRHP
St. Paul the Apostle		Davenport	Founded 1909; Middle section of church built in 1909 with subsequent additions
Ss. Mary & Mathias		Muscatine	Founded 1841 as St. Mathias; Built 1911
St. Mary		Wilton	Founded 1857; Built 2006-2007

== Iowa City Deanery ==
Name	Image	Location	Description/Notes
St. Joseph		Columbus Junction	Founded 1853; Built 1957
St. Thomas More		Coralville	Founded 1944 as Catholic Student Center in Iowa City; Built 2024-2025
St. Peter		Cosgrove	Founded 1840; Built 1893
St. Joseph		Hills	Founded 1902; Built 1903
Newman Catholic Student Center		Iowa City	Founded 1944; Built 1989; University of Iowa
St. Mary of the Visitation		Iowa City	Founded 1841; Built 1867–1869; listed on NRHP
St. Patrick		Iowa City	Founded 1872; Built 2008-2009
St. Wenceslaus		Iowa City	Founded 1891; Built 1893
St. Mary		Lone Tree	Founded 1872; Built 1915
St. Patrick		Marengo	Founded 1860; Built 1881
St. Mary		Nichols	Founded 1874; Built 1920; listed on NRHP
St. Mary		Oxford	Founded 1859; Built 1914
Holy Trinity		Richmond	Founded 1854; Built 1877
St. Mary		Riverside	Founded 1876; Built 1907; listed on NRHP
St. Mary		Solon	Founded 1846; Built 1998
St. Bridget		Victor	Founded 1873; Built 1927
St. James		Washington	Founded 1859; Built 1962
St. Joseph		Wellman	Founded 1912; Built 1962
St. Joseph		West Liberty	Founded 1858; Built 1950
St. Mary		Williamsburg	Founded 1887; Built 1920

== Ottumwa Deanery ==
Name	Image	Location	Description/Notes
St. Mary		Albia	Founded 1874; Built 1980
St. Mary Magdalen		Bloomfield	Founded 1853; Built 1953
St. Patrick		Brooklyn	Founded 1860; Built 1912
St. Mary		Centerville	Founded 1870; Built 1967
Immaculate Conception		Colfax	Founded 1893; Built 1919
St. Joseph		East Pleasant Plain	Founded 1902; Built 1960; Now in Ss. Joseph & Cabrini Parish founded in 2009
St. Patrick		Georgetown	Founded 1851; Built 1860–1865; listed on NRHP
St. Mary		Grinnell	Founded 1864; Built 1927
Holy Trinity		Keota	Founded 1877 as St. Mary; Built 1950; Holy Trinity Parish was founded in 1992 with the Merger of St. Mary's, St. Elizabeth in Harper (non-extant), and Ss. Peter and Paul, Clear Creek
St. Anthony		Knoxville	Founded 1870; Built 1977
St. Peter		Lovilia	Founded 1904; Built 1906
Sacred Heart		Melcher-Dallas	Founded 1913; Built 1971
St. Patrick		Melrose	Founded 1870; Built 1972
St. Joseph		North English	Founded 1904; Built 1964
St. Mary		Oskaloosa	Founded 1908; Built 1912
St. Mary of the Visitation		Ottumwa	Founded 1849; Built 1931 The two Ottumwa parishes merged in 2025 to form St. Joseph parish.
St. Patrick		Ottumwa	Founded 1879; Built 1956 The two Ottumwa parishes merged in 2025 to form St. Joseph parish.
St. Mary		Pella	Founded 1869; Built 2009
St. Francis Xavier Cabrini		Richland	Founded 1944; Built 1951; Now in Ss. Joseph & Cabrini Parish founded in 2009
St. Mary		Sigourney	Founded 1873; Built 1962

== Former churches ==
Name	Image	Location	Description/Notes
St. Joseph		Bauer	Founded 1853; Built 1875–1876; listed on NRHP
Ss. Peter & Paul		Clear Creek	Founded 1857; Built 1898–1899; listed on NRHP
Sacred Heart		Clinton	Founded 1891; Built 1891; now a chapel at Prince of Peace Preparatory
St. Boniface		Clinton	Founded 1861; Built 1908; listed on NRHP
St. Irenaeus		Clinton	Founded 1852; Built 1864–1871; listed on NRHP
St. Joseph		Davenport	Founded 1855 as St. Kunegunda Parish; Built 1881–1883; listed on NRHP
St. Mary		Davenport	Founded 1867; Built 1867; listed on NRHP
St. Joseph		Fort Madison	Founded 1840; Built 1886; listed on NRHP
St. Michael		Holbrook	Founded 1843; Built 1867; listed on NRHP
St. Mary		Muscatine	Founded 1867; Built 1877
Ss. Peter & Paul		Solon	Founded 1861; Built 1916–1917; listed on NRHP
Sacred Heart		Valeria	Founded 1873; Built 1896
St. Anne		Welton	Founded 1910; Built 1912
