= Almont, Iowa =

Almont
- Unincorporated community
- Location within the state of Iowa Almont (the United States)
- Country: United States
- State: Iowa
- County: Clinton
- Elevation: 656 ft (200 m)
- Time zone: UTC-6 (Central (CST))
  - Summer (DST): UTC-5 (CDT)
- Area code: 563
- GNIS feature ID: 464441

Almont is an unincorporated community in Elk River Township, Clinton County, in the U.S. state of Iowa.

== History ==
A post office was established as Almont Station in 1871, renamed Almont in 1883, and was discontinued in 1934. The community was named by Supt. Isaac B Howe of the Iowa Midland railroad, for the Mexican general Juan Almonte. Almost's population was 50 in 1925. The population was 20 in 1940.
