= Welton Township, Clinton County, Iowa =

Township in Iowa, US

Welton Township
- Township
- Location in Clinton County
- Coordinates: 41°54′26″N 090°36′45″W
- Country: United States
- State: Iowa
- County: Clinton

Area
  - Total: 32.15 sq mi (83.28 km^{2})
  - Land: 32.15 sq mi (83.28 km^{2})
  - Water: 0 sq mi (0 km^{2}) 0%
- Elevation: 790 ft (240 m)

Population (2000)
  - Total: 528
  - Density: 16/sq mi (6.3/km^{2})
- GNIS feature ID: 0468968

Welton Township is a township in Clinton County, Iowa, United States. As of the 2000 census, its population was 528.

== History ==
Welton Township was organized in 1858.

== Geography ==
Welton Township covers an area of 32.15 square miles (83.3 km^{2}) and contains one incorporated settlement, Welton. According to the USGS, it contains three cemeteries: Oak View, Walrod and Welton.

The stream of Negro Creek runs through this township.
