= Hampshire Township =

Hampshire Township may refer to the following townships in the United States:

- Hampshire Township, Kane County, Illinois
- Hampshire Township, Clinton County, Iowa
