= Orange Township, Clinton County, Iowa =

Township in Iowa, US

Orange Township
- Township
- Location in Clinton County
- Coordinates: 41°48′52″N 090°38′08″W
- Country: United States
- State: Iowa
- County: Clinton

Area
  - Total: 29.53 sq mi (76.47 km^{2})
  - Land: 29.49 sq mi (76.38 km^{2})
  - Water: 0.035 sq mi (0.09 km^{2}) 0.12%
- Elevation: 669 ft (204 m)

Population (2000)
  - Total: 1,253
  - Density: 42/sq mi (16.4/km^{2})
- GNIS feature ID: 0468469

Orange Township is a township in Clinton County, Iowa, United States. As of the 2000 census, its population was 1,253.

== History ==
Orange Township was organized in 1846. It was first known as Union Township until 1854, when the name was changed to its present form.

== Geography ==
Orange Township covers an area of 29.53 square miles (76.5 km^{2}) and contains one incorporated settlement, Grand Mound. According to the USGS, it contains five cemeteries: Allison, Barber, Calvary, Evergreen and Smith.

The stream of Barber Creek runs through this township.
