= Washington Township, Clinton County, Iowa =

Township in Iowa, US

Washington Township
- Township
- Location in Clinton County
- Coordinates: 41°54′43″N 090°28′50″W
- Country: United States
- State: Iowa
- County: Clinton

Area
  - Total: 32.04 sq mi (82.98 km^{2})
  - Land: 32.04 sq mi (82.98 km^{2})
  - Water: 0 sq mi (0 km^{2}) 0%
- Elevation: 833 ft (254 m)

Population (2000)
  - Total: 460
  - Density: 14/sq mi (5.5/km^{2})
- GNIS feature ID: 0468911

Washington Township is a township in Clinton County, Iowa, United States. As of the 2000 census, its population was 460.

== History ==
Washington Township was organized in 1856. It is named for George Washington.

== Geography ==
Washington Township covers an area of 32.04 square miles (83.0 km^{2}) and contains no incorporated settlements. According to the USGS, it contains four cemeteries: Clinton County Farm, Rossiter, Saint Patricks and White.
