= Malone, Iowa =

- Unincorporated community
- Location within the state of Iowa Malone, Iowa (the United States)
- Country: United States
- State: Iowa
- County: Clinton
- Elevation: 663 ft (202 m)
- Time zone: UTC-6 (Central (CST))
  - Summer (DST): UTC-5 (CDT)
- Area code: 563
- GNIS feature ID: 1828967

Malone is an unincorporated community in Clinton County, in the U.S. state of Iowa.

== History ==
Malone was originally called Ramessa, but after a fire, the railroad station was moved and renamed Malone, after Malone, New York. A post office was established as Ramessa in 1857, renamed Malone in 1867; the post office was discontinued in 1922.

Malone's population was 57 in 1902, and 67 in 1925. The population was 15 in 1940.
