= Waterford Township, Clinton County, Iowa =

Township in Iowa, US

Waterford Township
- Township
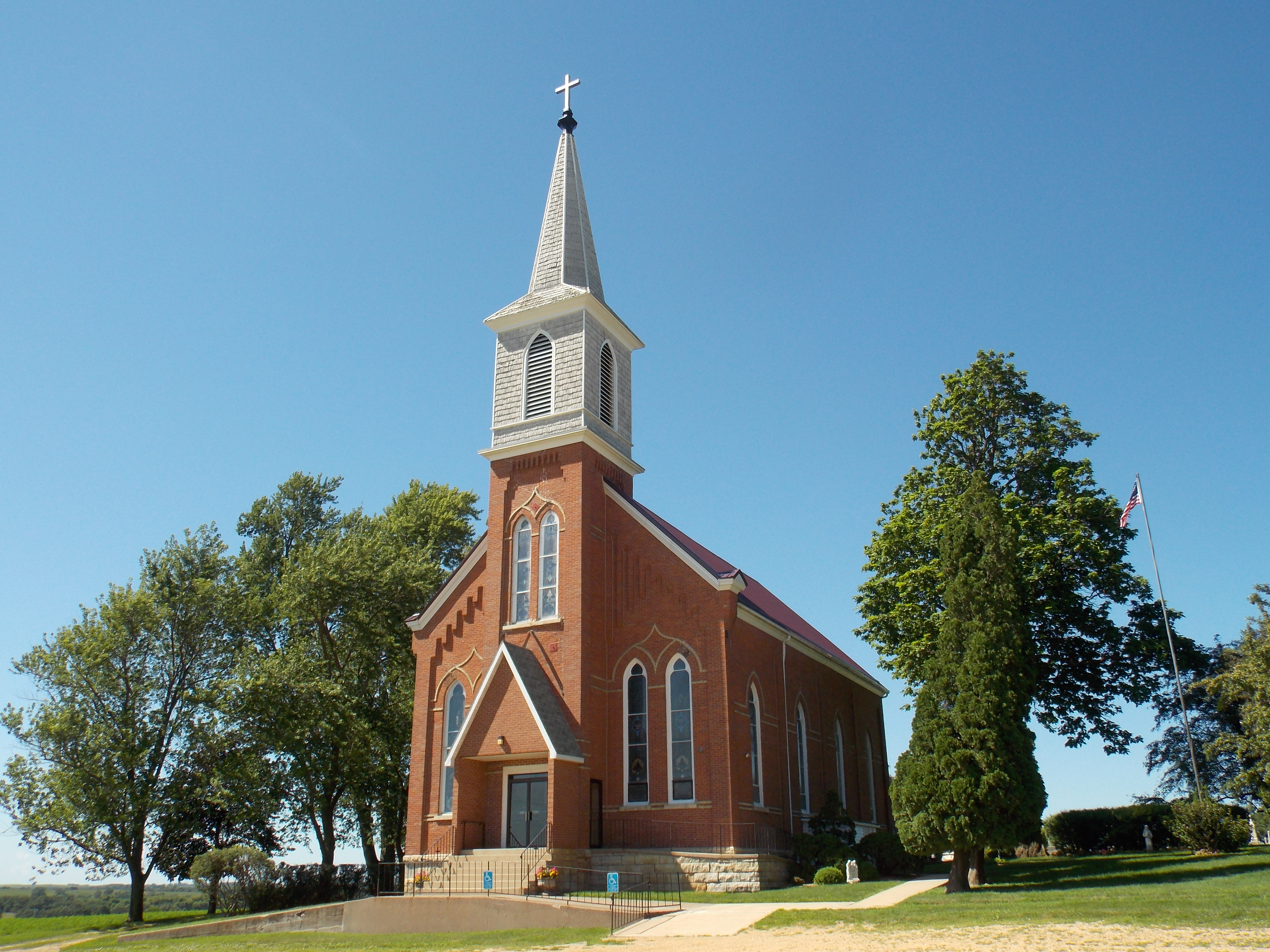
- St. Joseph Catholic Church, Sugar Creek

- Location in Clinton County
- Coordinates: 41°59′37″N 090°29′42″W
- Country: United States
- State: Iowa
- County: Clinton

Area
  - Total: 36.13 sq mi (93.57 km^{2})
  - Land: 36.13 sq mi (93.57 km^{2})
  - Water: 0 sq mi (0 km^{2}) 0%
- Elevation: 866 ft (264 m)

Population (2000)
  - Total: 796
  - Density: 22/sq mi (8.5/km^{2})
- GNIS feature ID: 0468949

Waterford Township is a township in Clinton County, Iowa, United States. As of the 2000 census, its population was 796.

== History ==
Waterford Township was organized in April, 1854. It was first called Henry Township, and the name was changed to its present form in May of that year.

== Geography ==
Waterford Township covers an area of 36.13 square miles (93.6 km^{2}) and contains one incorporated settlement, Charlotte. According to the USGS, it contains six cemeteries: Assumption, Glahn, Gohlmann, Immaculate Conception, McClure and Saint Josephs.

The streams of Honey Creek, Williams Creek, Williams Creek and Willow Creek run through this township.
