= Camanche Township, Clinton County, Iowa =

Township in Iowa, US

Camanche Township
- Township
- Location in Clinton County
- Coordinates: 41°46′43″N 090°18′02″W
- Country: United States
- State: Iowa
- County: Clinton

Area
  - Total: 22.63 sq mi (58.61 km^{2})
  - Land: 19.47 sq mi (50.43 km^{2})
  - Water: 3.16 sq mi (8.19 km^{2}) 13.97%
- Elevation: 630 ft (192 m)

Population (2000)
  - Total: 4,368
  - Density: 224/sq mi (86.6/km^{2})
- GNIS feature ID: 0467523

Camanche Township is a township in Clinton County, Iowa, United States. As of the 2000 census, its population was 4,368.

== History ==
Camanche Township was founded in 1841.

== Geography ==
Camanche Township covers an area of 22.63 square miles (58.6 km^{2}) and contains one incorporated settlement, Camanche. According to the USGS, it contains two cemeteries: Rose Hill and Shaffton.

Nancy Elaine Lake and Willow Lake are within this township. The streams of Beaver Slough, Rock Creek, Schricker Slough and Sodus Creek run through this township.
