= Liberty Township, Clinton County, Iowa =

Township in Iowa, US

Liberty Township
- Township
- Location in Clinton County
- Coordinates: 41°54′20″N 090°50′53″W
- Country: United States
- State: Iowa
- County: Clinton

Area
  - Total: 36 sq mi (94 km^{2})
  - Land: 36 sq mi (94 km^{2})
  - Water: 0 sq mi (0 km^{2}) 0%
- Elevation: 690 ft (210 m)

Population (2000)
  - Total: 374
  - Density: 10/sq mi (4/km^{2})
- GNIS feature ID: 0468215

Liberty Township is a township in Clinton County, Iowa, United States. As of the 2000 census, its population was 374.

== History ==
Liberty Township was organized in 1844.

== Geography ==
Liberty Township covers an area of 36.29 square miles (94.0 km^{2}) and contains one incorporated settlement, Toronto. According to the USGS, it contains two cemeteries: Rose Hill and Saint James.
