= Spring Rock Township, Clinton County, Iowa =

Township in Iowa, US

Spring Rock Township
- Township
- Location in Clinton County
- Coordinates: 41°49′00″N 090°51′06″W
- Country: United States
- State: Iowa
- County: Clinton

Area
  - Total: 36.3 sq mi (93.9 km^{2})
  - Land: 36.3 sq mi (93.9 km^{2})
  - Water: 0 sq mi (0 km^{2}) 0%
- Elevation: 682 ft (208 m)

Population (2000)
  - Total: 1,142
  - Density: 32/sq mi (12.2/km^{2})
- GNIS feature ID: 0468744

Spring Rock Township is a township in Clinton County, Iowa, United States. As of the 2000 census, its population was 1,142.

== History ==
Spring Rock Township was organized in 1844. The township takes its name from a huge rock at found at a spring in Scott County.

== Geography ==
Spring Rock Township covers an area of 36.25 square miles (93.9 km^{2}) and contains one incorporated settlement, Wheatland, along with some unincorporated settlements such as Big Rock. According to the USGS, it contains four cemeteries: Homigrahusen, Pine Hill, Rose Hill and Saint Pauls.

The streams of Calamus Creek, Lizard Creek, Rock Creek and Yankee Run run through this township.
