= Grant Township, Clinton County, Iowa =

Township in Iowa, US

Grant Township
- Township
- Location in Clinton County
- Coordinates: 41°53′54″N 090°43′08″W
- Country: United States
- State: Iowa
- County: Clinton

Area
  - Total: 36.13 sq mi (93.58 km^{2})
  - Land: 36.09 sq mi (93.46 km^{2})
  - Water: 0.046 sq mi (0.12 km^{2}) 0.13%
- Elevation: 720 ft (220 m)

Population (2000)
  - Total: 287
  - Density: 8.0/sq mi (3.1/km^{2})
- GNIS feature ID: 0467935

Grant Township is a township in Clinton County, Iowa, United States. As of the 2000 census, its population was 287.

== Geography ==
Grant Township covers an area of 36.13 square miles (93.6 km^{2}) and contains no incorporated settlements. According to the USGS, it contains two cemeteries: Pine Hill and Saint Columbkille.
