= Central DeWitt Community School District =

Public school district in DeWitt, Iowa, United States

Coordinates: 41.823237°N 90.528159°W

Location
- DeWitt, Iowa Clinton County United States
- Coordinates: 41.823237, -90.528159

District information
- Type: Local school district
- Grades: K-12
- Superintendent: Stephanie Mishler
- Asst. superintendent(s): Jen Vance
- Schools: 4
- Budget: $23,927,000 (2020-21)
- NCES District ID: 1906810

Students and staff
- Students: 1,613 (2022-23)
- Teachers: 120.43 FTE
- Staff: 116.73 FTE
- Student–teacher ratio: 13.39
- Athletic conference: Mississippi Athletic Conference
- District mascot: Sabers
- Colors: Gold and Purple

Other information
- Website: www.cd-csd.org

Central DeWitt Community School District (CDCSD) is a rural public school district headquartered in DeWitt, Iowa. It was legally known as the Central Clinton Community School District until July 1, 2014. It also used the name Central Community School District or Central Community Schools.

Located in Clinton County, it serves DeWitt, Grand Mound, Low Moor, and Welton. The district's area is about 179 square miles (460 km^{2}).

== History ==
The District was formed in 1958 with the schools in DeWitt, Grand Mound, Welton, and Low Moor. The 9 through 12 classes were moved to the new High School on the east side of DeWitt. Kindergarten through 4th remained at the Elementary School in DeWitt. DeWitt students of 5th or 6th were bussed to either Grand Mound or Welton. If a student was at either Grand Mound or Welton, they were bused to the other school for the other. This was changed so the student would go the same school for the 6th grade. After the new elementary school was opened in DeWitt in 1970, students stayed in their local school until 6th grade. The older DeWitt Elementary becoming a jr. high with 6 through 8th grades. The outlying schools were closed by the late 1970s.

Due to a referendum, the name of the district was changed from Central Clinton Community School District to the Central DeWitt School District as of July 1, 2014.

== Schools ==
- Central DeWitt High School
- Central DeWitt Middle School
- Central DeWitt Intermediate School
- Ekstrand Elementary School

=== Ekstrand Elementary ===
Ekstrand Elementary School is located in DeWitt and serves students in pre-kindergarten through grade 3. Built in 1970, the school is named for former principal and district superintendent Carl Ekstrand.

=== Central DeWitt Intermediate School ===
Located in DeWitt and attached to the middle and high school. The middle school was built in 2011 as part of an extensive expansion project to the high school. The Intermediate School houses grades 4–6.

=== Central DeWitt Middle School ===
Located in DeWitt, and attached to the high school and intermediate building, the middle school houses grades 7 and 8.

=== Central DeWitt High School ===
Located in DeWitt, the present Central DeWitt High School houses grades nine through twelve. The first high school in DeWitt was built in 1928 and was a total of 3 stories tall with the cafeteria and school gymnasium on the basement level, teachers lounge and offices on the first level, the majority of classrooms on the second level, and a few minor classes and equipment storage on the third level. When a new school was planned and built in the autumn of 1959, the three-story building was reconfigured into a junior high. By the late 1980s it was decided that the junior high school building was becoming too costly to maintain and was too expensive to bring up to code. It also lacked certain necessities including handicap accessibility. The school also posed a danger due to the presence of asbestos throughout the building. It was demolished by 1995 after a new junior high/intermediate school was built adjoining the high school. The new school's need for increased space has resulted in a recent $1.891 million addition. Construction of the new facilities began in November 2007, and includes a new cafeteria, remodeled kitchen space, and new alternative classroom. In 2010–2011, another expansion project was started, creating a new middle school, new high school offices, several new classrooms, renovation of the old high school, a new library that attaches to the Intermediate, Middle and High school, a world-class performing arts center, and new athletic facilities.

== Athletics ==
Central DeWitt formerly competed in the WaMaC Conference, a league of Class 3A and several larger Class 2A schools spanning from east-central to northeast Iowa, where they had a great rivalry with the Maquoketa Cardinals, especially in football; the arrangement began in 2003, when the old Big Bend Conference dissolved and several of that league's former schools migrated to the WaMaC. In the latter half of the 2010s, upon news that Burlington was leaving the Mississippi Athletic Conference, Central DeWitt officials began a process to join the MAC, citing travel distance and competition factors. In April 2019, principals from the MAC voted to admit Central DeWitt, an arrangement that was set to begin in either fall 2020 or fall 2021, depending on when the WaMaC would allow them to be released. Central DeWitt will be the smallest public school in the conference—firmly Class 3A in a league of otherwise primarily Class 4A schools—with only Davenport Assumption having a smaller enrollment.

=== State championships ===
- Boys basketball - Class 2A in 1981
- Girls basketball - Class 3A in 1994
- Girls track and field - Class 2A in 1990 and 2002
- Boys golf in 2017 and 2018
- Co-ed golf in 1986, 1987, 1988
- Girls tennis doubles - Class 1A in 2024
- Boys cross country - Class 2A in 2000 and 2001. During that two-year stretch, the Saber Boys' Cross Country team went 254–0, winning the team championship in 20 consecutive meets.

== Former schools ==
The district previously operated Grand Mound Elementary School and Welton Elementary School. By 2001 a bond proposal was floated, and the proposal was to have these schools closed in exchange for expanding the elementary schools in DeWitt, which would provide centralized services and facilities for the handicapped.

Grand Mound Elementary was on a property of about 4 acres (1.6 ha). The first school building was built in 1917. Another school building, built in 1954, had a cafeteria, gymnasium, and two classrooms. In 1995, the district closed the original building because it was deemed to be structurally unsafe and its roof was in a poor condition. The building was demolished in 1999. After the demolition, the cafeteria began serving as an office, a school nurse area, and a reading and speech therapy instruction area. By 2001 Grand Mound Elementary served Kindergarten and the first grade. Grand Mound Elementary had 38 students in the 1998–1999 school year, and by 2001 the enrollment was down to 35. Grand Mound students used the library, media and computer facilities at Welton Elementary. By 2002 the school closed, and was sold to God's Family Baptist Church.

Welton Elementary had three buildings. The third floor of the main building had a computer laboratory, a library, and a media center. In addition to the main building, there was an art room and teacher's lounge facility, and a modular facility with two classrooms. Welton Elementary had 217 students in the 1998–1999 school year. The district at one time considered expanding Welton Elementary to upper elementary levels but decided against it since it deemed the building too out of date and architecturally difficult to renovate, citing narrow staircases which would have difficulty accommodating chairlifts and the multi-story design. Welton was not fully accessible to handicapped students. Welton Elementary closed in the summer of 2005, and was demolished in 2006. A historic newspaper was found inside the cornerstone, and the City of Welton government received the school memorabilia.

When the Welton and Grand Mound schools were in operation, employees traveled back and forth between the two facilities.

== See also ==
- List of school districts in Iowa
- List of high schools in Iowa
