= Clinton County, Iowa =

County in Iowa, United States

- County
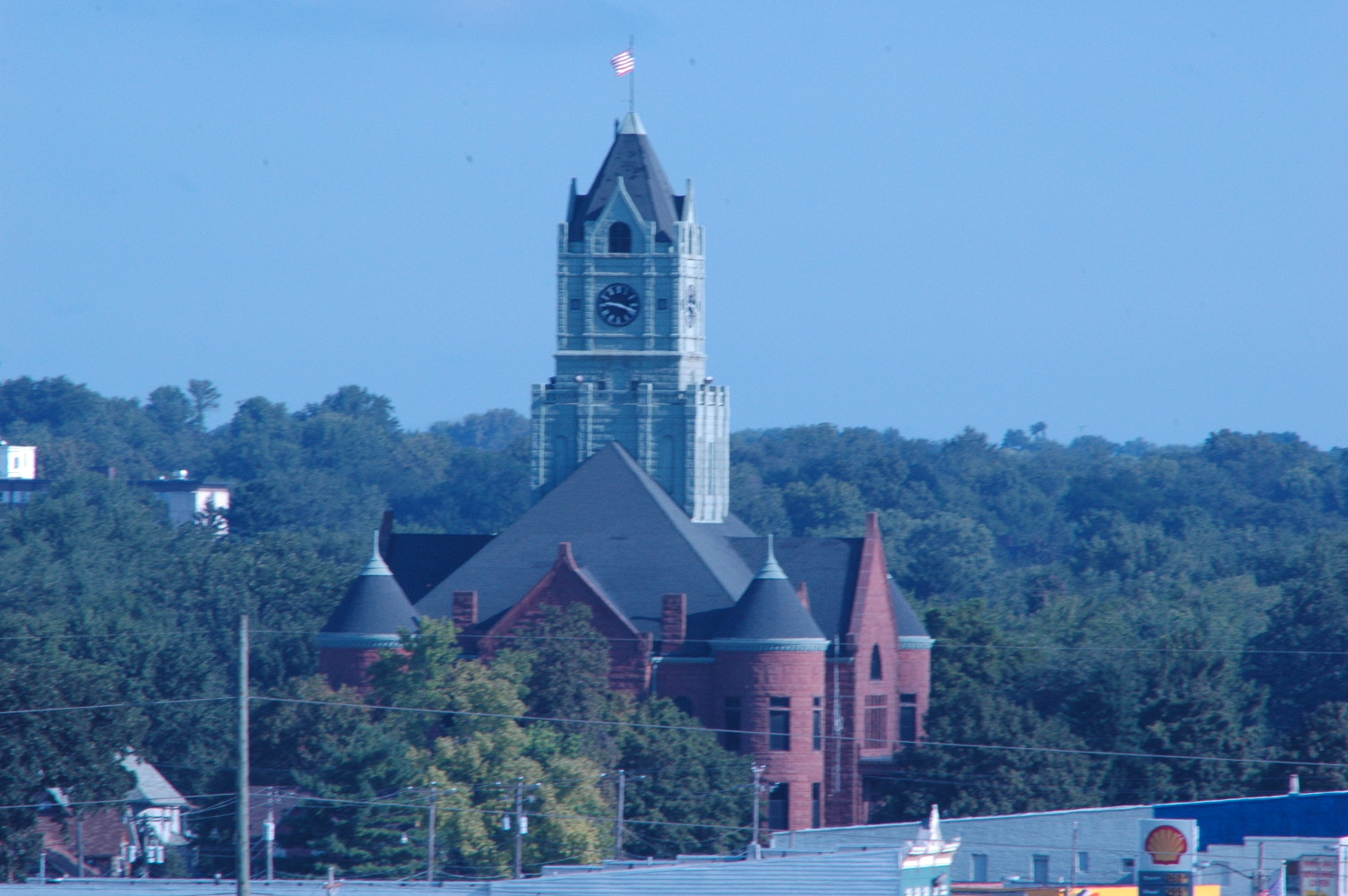
- Clinton County Courthouse

- Location within the U.S. state of Iowa
- Coordinates: 41°53′34″N 90°31′39″W
- Country: United States
- State: Iowa
- Founded: 1837
- Named for: DeWitt Clinton
- Seat: Clinton
- Largest city: Clinton

Area
  - Total: 710 sq mi (1,800 km^{2})
  - Land: 695 sq mi (1,800 km^{2})
  - Water: 15 sq mi (39 km^{2}) 2.1%

Population (2020)
  - Total: 46,460
  - Estimate (2025): 46,002 ▼
  - Density: 66.8/sq mi (25.8/km^{2})
- Time zone: UTC−6 (Central)
  - Summer (DST): UTC−5 (CDT)
- Congressional district: 1st
- Website: www.clintoncounty-ia.gov
- Iowa county number 23

Clinton County is a county located in the U.S. state of Iowa. As of the 2020 United States census, the population was 46,460. Its county seat is Clinton. Its name is in honor of the seventh Governor of New York State, DeWitt Clinton. Clinton County comprises the Clinton, Iowa Micropolitan Statistical Area, which is also included in the Davenport–Moline–Clinton, Muscatine, Iowa–Illinois Combined Statistical Area.

== History ==
Clinton County was formed on December 21, 1837. It was named for DeWitt Clinton, a Governor of New York and most ardent advocate for the construction of the Erie Canal. The cities of DeWitt and Clinton were also named after him.

In 1835, Elijah Buell built a log cabin for himself and his family and was thus the first settler of the region. In 1854, the first newspaper was issued. In 1858, the Lyons Female College for girls opened its doors; the tuition was set at US$175 per student.

The county has used three courthouses in its history. The structure currently in use was constructed in Romanesque style and opened in 1897.

=== Early settlement ===
Clinton county was first settled in 1836, by Mr. Bourne, who located upon Sec. 1, T. 80, R. 4, East. The county was surveyed in 1837, by the Messrs. Burtz. The Surveyor General's office was then at Cincinnati, Ohio. In 1840, the county was organized by Sheriff Bourne. In 1841, R. R. Bed ford and others formed a little settlement at De Witt, and during the same year Messrs. Wheeler and Evans erected a log court-house. In stepping from the past to the present, we quote the language of one of the "oldest inhabitants." He says: "Clinton County was originally settled by the poorest class of people on God's earth; and it is with great pleasure that I have witnessed their progress, slow but sure, and now find the most of them very comfortably situated."

The population of this County in 1840, was 821; in 1850, 2822; in 1854, 7000; and in 1856, 11,000. The population of Lyons in 1850, was 453. In 1856 the population increased to 2700.

== Geography ==
According to the United States Census Bureau, the county has a total area of 710 square miles (1,800 km^{2}), of which 695 square miles (1,800 km^{2}) is land and 15 square miles (39 km^{2}) (2.1%) is water. It includes the easternmost point in the state of Iowa, on the Mississippi River in Elk River township in the northeast section of the county.

=== Transit ===
- Clinton Municipal Transit Administration

=== Major highways ===
- US 30
- US 61
- US 67
- Iowa 136

=== Adjacent counties ===
- Jackson County (north)
- Carroll County, Illinois (northeast)
- Whiteside County, Illinois (east)
- Rock Island County, Illinois (southeast)
- Scott County (south)
- Cedar County (southwest)
- Jones County (northwest)

=== National protected area ===
- Upper Mississippi River National Wildlife and Fish Refuge (part)

== Demographics ==
Historical population
Census	Pop.	Note	%±
1840	821		—
1850	2,822		243.7%
1860	18,938		571.1%
1870	35,357		86.7%
1880	36,763		4.0%
1890	41,199		12.1%
1900	43,832		6.4%
1910	45,394		3.6%
1920	43,371		−4.5%
1930	44,377		2.3%
1940	44,722		0.8%
1950	49,664		11.1%
1960	55,060		10.9%
1970	56,749		3.1%
1980	57,122		0.7%
1990	51,040		−10.6%
2000	50,149		−1.7%
2010	49,116		−2.1%
2020	46,460		−5.4%
2025 (est.)	46,002	▼	−1.0%
U.S. Decennial Census; 1790-1960 1900-1990; 1990-2000 2010-2018

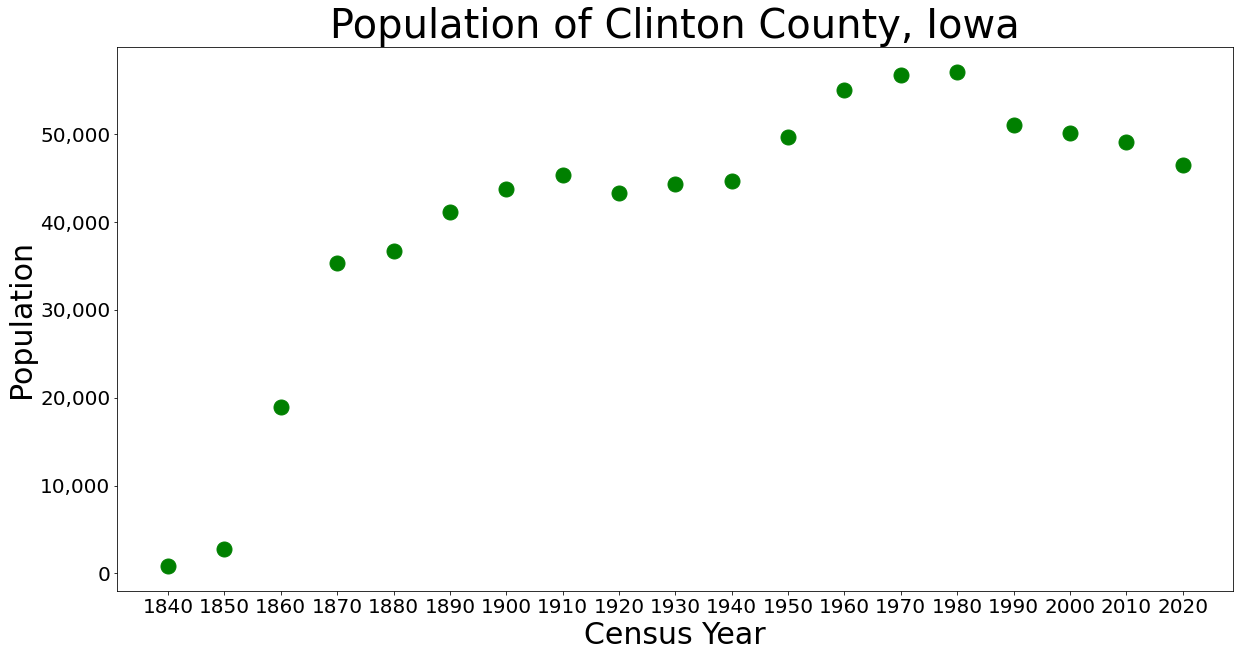
Population of Clinton County from US census data

=== 2020 census ===
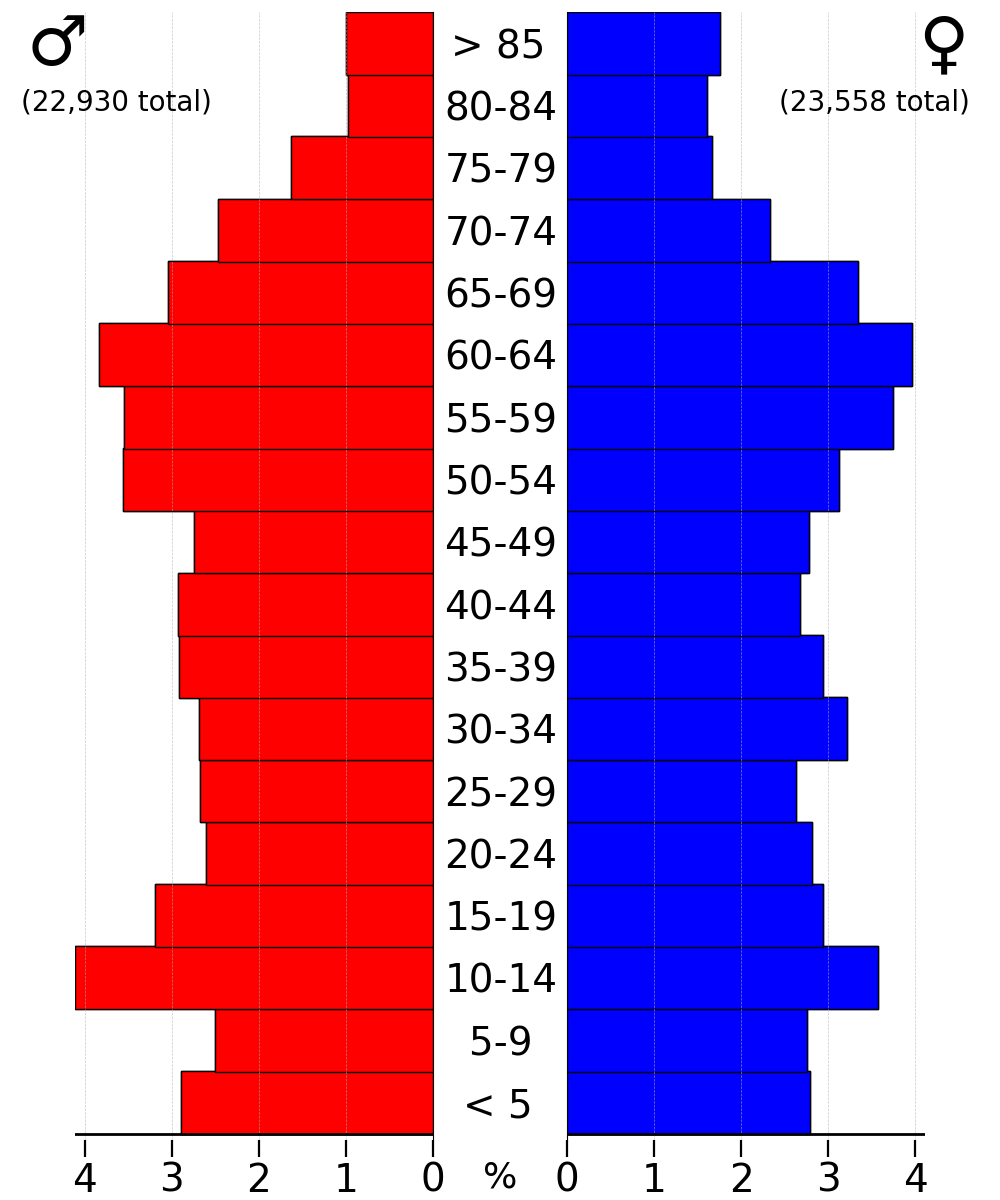
2022 US Census population pyramid for Clinton County from ACS 5-year estimates

As of the 2020 census, the county had a population of 46,460 and a population density of 66.9/sq mi (25.8/km^{2}); 94.95% of the population reported being of one race.

The median age was 42.6 years. 22.8% of residents were under the age of 18 and 20.3% of residents were 65 years of age or older. For every 100 females there were 96.6 males, and for every 100 females age 18 and over there were 94.6 males age 18 and over.

The racial makeup of the county was 89.9% White, 3.1% Black or African American, 0.3% American Indian and Alaska Native, 0.6% Asian, <0.1% Native Hawaiian and Pacific Islander, 1.1% from some other race, and 5.0% from two or more races. Hispanic or Latino residents of any race comprised 3.3% of the population.

69.9% of residents lived in urban areas, while 30.1% lived in rural areas.

There were 19,483 households in the county, of which 27.5% had children under the age of 18 living in them. Of all households, 47.2% were married-couple households, 19.3% were households with a male householder and no spouse or partner present, and 25.2% were households with a female householder and no spouse or partner present. About 30.3% of all households were made up of individuals and 13.8% had someone living alone who was 65 years of age or older.

There were 21,517 housing units, of which 9.5% were vacant. Among occupied housing units, 73.6% were owner-occupied and 26.4% were renter-occupied. The homeowner vacancy rate was 2.5% and the rental vacancy rate was 10.8%.

Clinton County Racial Composition
Race	Number	Percent
White (NH)	41,226	88.73%
Black or African American (NH)	1,392	3%
Native American (NH)	103	0.22%
Asian (NH)	252	0.54%
Pacific Islander (NH)	10	0.02%
Other/Mixed (NH)	1,938	4.2%
Hispanic or Latino	1,539	3.31%

=== 2010 census ===
The 2010 census recorded a population of 49,116 in the county, with a population density of 70.7/sq mi (27.3/km^{2}). There were 21,733 housing units, of which 20,223 were occupied.

=== 2000 census ===
As of the census of 2000, there were 50,149 people, 20,105 households, and 13,671 families residing in the county. The population density was 72 people per square mile (28 people/km^{2}). There were 21,585 housing units at an average density of 31 per square mile (12/km^{2}). The racial makeup of the county was 95.87% White, 1.89% Black or African American, 0.24% Native American, 0.56% Asian, 0.02% Pacific Islander, 0.34% from other races, and 1.08% from two or more races. 1.25% of the population were Hispanic or Latino of any race.

There were 20,105 households, out of which 31.80% had children under the age of 18 living with them, 54.60% were married couples living together, 9.80% had a female householder with no husband present, and 32.00% were non-families. 27.40% of all households were made up of individuals, and 12.20% had someone living alone who was 65 years of age or older. The average household size was 2.44 and the average family size was 2.98.

In the county, the population was spread out, with 25.60% under the age of 18, 8.20% from 18 to 24, 27.00% from 25 to 44, 23.30% from 45 to 64, and 15.80% who were 65 years of age or older. The median age was 38 years. For every 100 females there were 94.30 males. For every 100 females age 18 and over, there were 91.20 males.

The median income for a household in the county was $37,423, and the median income for a family was $46,450. Males had a median income of $35,049 versus $21,333 for females. The per capita income for the county was $17,724. About 7.70% of families and 10.20% of the population were below the poverty line, including 13.70% of those under age 18 and 7.80% of those age 65 or over.

== Communities ==
=== Cities ===
- Andover
- Calamus
- Camanche
- Charlotte
- Clinton
- DeWitt
- Delmar
- Goose Lake
- Grand Mound
- Lost Nation
- Low Moor
- Toronto
- Welton
- Wheatland

=== Unincorporated communities ===
- Almont
- Big Rock (mostly in Scott County)
- Bryant
- Buena Vista
- Elvira
- Elwood
- Folletts
- Malone
- Petersville
- Teeds Grove

=== Townships ===
Clinton County is divided into these townships:

- Bloomfield
- Brookfield
- Camanche
- Center
- De Witt
- Deep Creek
- Eden
- Elk River
- Grant
- Hampshire
- Liberty
- Olive
- Orange
- Sharon
- Spring Rock
- Washington
- Waterford
- Welton

=== Population ranking ===
The population ranking of the following table is based on the 2020 United States census of Clinton County. † county seat

Rank	City/Town/etc.	Municipal type	Population (2020 Census)
1	Clinton †	City	24,469
2	DeWitt	City	5,514
3	Camanche	City	4,570
4	Wheatland	City	775
5	Grand Mound	City	615
6	Delmar	City	542
7	Lost Nation	City	434
8	Charlotte	City	389
9	Calamus	City	356
10	Low Moor	City	250
11	Goose Lake	City	239
12	Welton	City	121
13	Andover	City	109
14	Toronto	City	102

== Politics ==
Similar to many other counties in Iowa, Clinton County was reliably Democratic from Michael Dukakis's win in 1988 until 2016, when Donald Trump flipped many counties in Iowa. He improved on his results in 2020 and improved even more in 2024. Despite this, at the local level Clinton County voters are more divided, supporting Democrat Mike Zimmer over Republican Katie Whittington in the 2025 state senate election.

United States presidential election results for Clinton County, Iowa
Year	Republican		Democratic		Third party(ies)	
Year	No.	%	No.	%	No.	%
1896	5,584	54.02%	4,590	44.40%	163	1.58%
1900	5,344	51.19%	4,758	45.58%	337	3.23%
1904	5,265	53.23%	4,074	41.19%	552	5.58%
1908	4,836	48.68%	4,821	48.53%	277	2.79%
1912	1,890	20.58%	3,633	39.55%	3,662	39.87%
1916	5,576	56.61%	3,903	39.62%	371	3.77%
1920	11,746	66.98%	3,153	17.98%	2,637	15.04%
1924	10,359	52.68%	3,811	19.38%	5,495	27.94%
1928	12,295	58.57%	8,643	41.17%	54	0.26%
1932	9,085	41.52%	12,587	57.53%	208	0.95%
1936	10,016	43.47%	12,269	53.25%	757	3.29%
1940	12,177	54.17%	10,251	45.60%	50	0.22%
1944	11,533	58.77%	8,028	40.91%	63	0.32%
1948	9,859	52.82%	8,534	45.72%	272	1.46%
1952	15,372	65.73%	7,975	34.10%	38	0.16%
1956	14,765	63.62%	8,394	36.17%	49	0.21%
1960	13,797	56.71%	10,508	43.19%	25	0.10%
1964	8,219	36.48%	14,267	63.32%	47	0.21%
1968	11,513	51.92%	9,515	42.91%	1,147	5.17%
1972	12,768	55.60%	9,895	43.09%	301	1.31%
1976	12,401	50.55%	11,746	47.88%	387	1.58%
1980	13,025	51.66%	9,698	38.47%	2,488	9.87%
1984	13,914	54.77%	11,240	44.25%	250	0.98%
1988	10,243	44.53%	12,549	54.56%	210	0.91%
1992	8,746	35.04%	11,683	46.81%	4,531	18.15%
1996	7,624	35.30%	11,481	53.17%	2,490	11.53%
2000	9,229	41.61%	12,276	55.35%	675	3.04%
2004	10,666	43.21%	13,813	55.96%	205	0.83%
2008	9,324	37.72%	15,018	60.75%	380	1.54%
2012	9,432	37.73%	15,141	60.56%	427	1.71%
2016	11,276	48.88%	10,095	43.76%	1,696	7.35%
2020	13,361	54.12%	10,812	43.80%	514	2.08%
2024	13,964	58.48%	9,472	39.67%	442	1.85%

== Education ==
School districts include:

- Calamus–Wheatland Community School District
- Camanche Community School District
- Central DeWitt Community School District
- Clinton Community School District
- Delwood Community School District
- Easton Valley Community School District
- Maquoketa Community School District
- Midland Community School District
- Northeast Community School District

== See also ==
- National Register of Historic Places listings in Clinton County, Iowa
- Clinton County Courthouse
