= Center Township, Clinton County, Iowa =

Township in Iowa, US

Center Township
- Township
- Location in Clinton County
- Coordinates: 41°54′12″N 090°22′16″W
- Country: United States
- State: Iowa
- County: Clinton

Area
  - Total: 42.42 sq mi (109.88 km^{2})
  - Land: 42.40 sq mi (109.82 km^{2})
  - Water: 0.023 sq mi (0.06 km^{2}) 0.05%
- Elevation: 643 ft (196 m)

Population (2000)
  - Total: 626
  - Density: 15/sq mi (5.7/km^{2})
- GNIS feature ID: 0467572

Center Township is a township in Clinton County, Iowa, United States. At the 2000 census, its population was 626.

== History ==
Center Township was organized in 1852.

== Geography ==
Center Township covers an area of 42.42 square miles (109.9 km^{2}) and contains no incorporated settlements. According to the USGS, it contains two cemeteries: Center Grove and Elvira.
