= Jacob Mincks =

American politician

Member of the Iowa Senate from the 9th district
- In office January 14, 1963 – January 9, 1967
- Preceded by: Carl Hoschek
- Succeeded by: Gene W. Glenn

Member of the Iowa Senate from the 13th district
- In office January 12, 1959 – January 14, 1963
- Preceded by: Samuel Burton
- Succeeded by: Joseph Flatt

Personal details
- Born: August 26, 1913 Davis County, Iowa
- Died: December 17, 1981 (aged 68) Ottumwa, Iowa
- Party: Democratic

Jacob Mincks (August 26, 1913 – December 17, 1981) was an American politician who served in the Iowa Senate from 1959 to 1967.
