= Bloomfield Township, Clinton County, Iowa =

Township in Iowa, US

Bloomfield Township
- Township
- Location in Clinton County
- Coordinates: 41°59′31″N 090°36′20″W
- Country: United States
- State: Iowa
- County: Clinton

Area
  - Total: 36.22 sq mi (93.81 km^{2})
  - Land: 36.20 sq mi (93.76 km^{2})
  - Water: 0.015 sq mi (0.04 km^{2}) 0.04%
- Elevation: 781 ft (238 m)

Population (2000)
  - Total: 865
  - Density: 24/sq mi (9.2/km^{2})
- GNIS feature ID: 0467462

Bloomfield Township is a township in Clinton County, Iowa, United States. As of the 2000 census, its population was 865.

== History ==
Bloomfield Township was organized in 1855.

== Geography ==
Bloomfield Township covers an area of 36.22 square miles (93.8 km^{2}) and contains one incorporated settlement, Delmar. According to the USGS, it contains three cemeteries: Bloomfield, Evergreen and Saint Patricks.
