= Petersville, Iowa =

- Unincorporated community
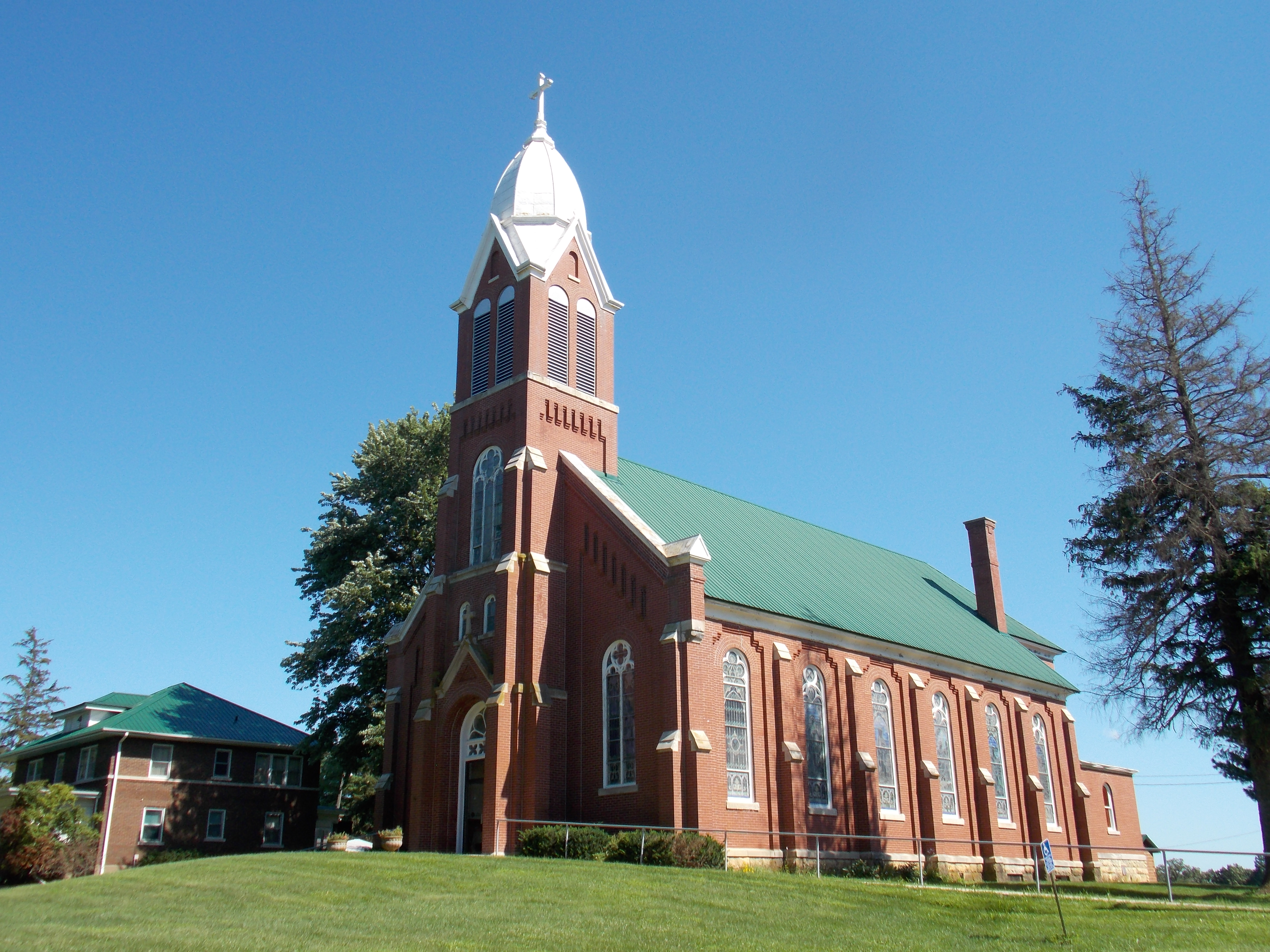
- Immaculate Conception Catholic Church, Petersville

- Location within Iowa
- Coordinates: 41°58′03″N 90°32′01″W
- Country: United States
- State: Iowa
- County: Clinton
- Elevation: 755 ft (230 m)
- Time zone: UTC-6 (Central (CST))
  - Summer (DST): UTC-5 (CDT)
- Area code: 563
- GNIS feature ID: 464697

Petersville is an unincorporated community in Clinton County, in the U.S. state of Iowa.

== History ==
Petersville was originally called Quigley. The present name honors John Peters and family, pioneer settlers. The town was platted as Petersville in 1902.

A post office was established under the name Quigley in 1883, and renamed Petersville in 1902; this post office closed in 1935.

Petersville's population was 55 in 1925. The population was 28 in 1940.
