= Deep Creek Township, Clinton County, Iowa =

Township in Iowa, US

Deep Creek Township
- Township
- Location in Clinton County
- Coordinates: 41°59′27″N 090°22′47″W
- Country: United States
- State: Iowa
- County: Clinton

Area
  - Total: 36.24 sq mi (93.87 km^{2})
  - Land: 36.1 sq mi (93.4 km^{2})
  - Water: 0.18 sq mi (0.47 km^{2}) 0.5%
- Elevation: 712 ft (217 m)

Population (2000)
  - Total: 713
  - Density: 20/sq mi (7.6/km^{2})
- GNIS feature ID: 0467691

Deep Creek Township is a township in Clinton County, Iowa, United States. As of the 2000 census, its population was 713.

== Geography ==
Deep Creek Township covers an area of 36.24 square miles (93.9 km^{2}) and contains one incorporated settlement, Goose Lake. According to the USGS, it contains three cemeteries: Saint Marys Catholic, Valley and Vernon Prairie.

Goose Lake is within this township. The streams of Bear Creek and Simmons Creek run through this township.
