= Elwood, Iowa =

- Unincorporated community
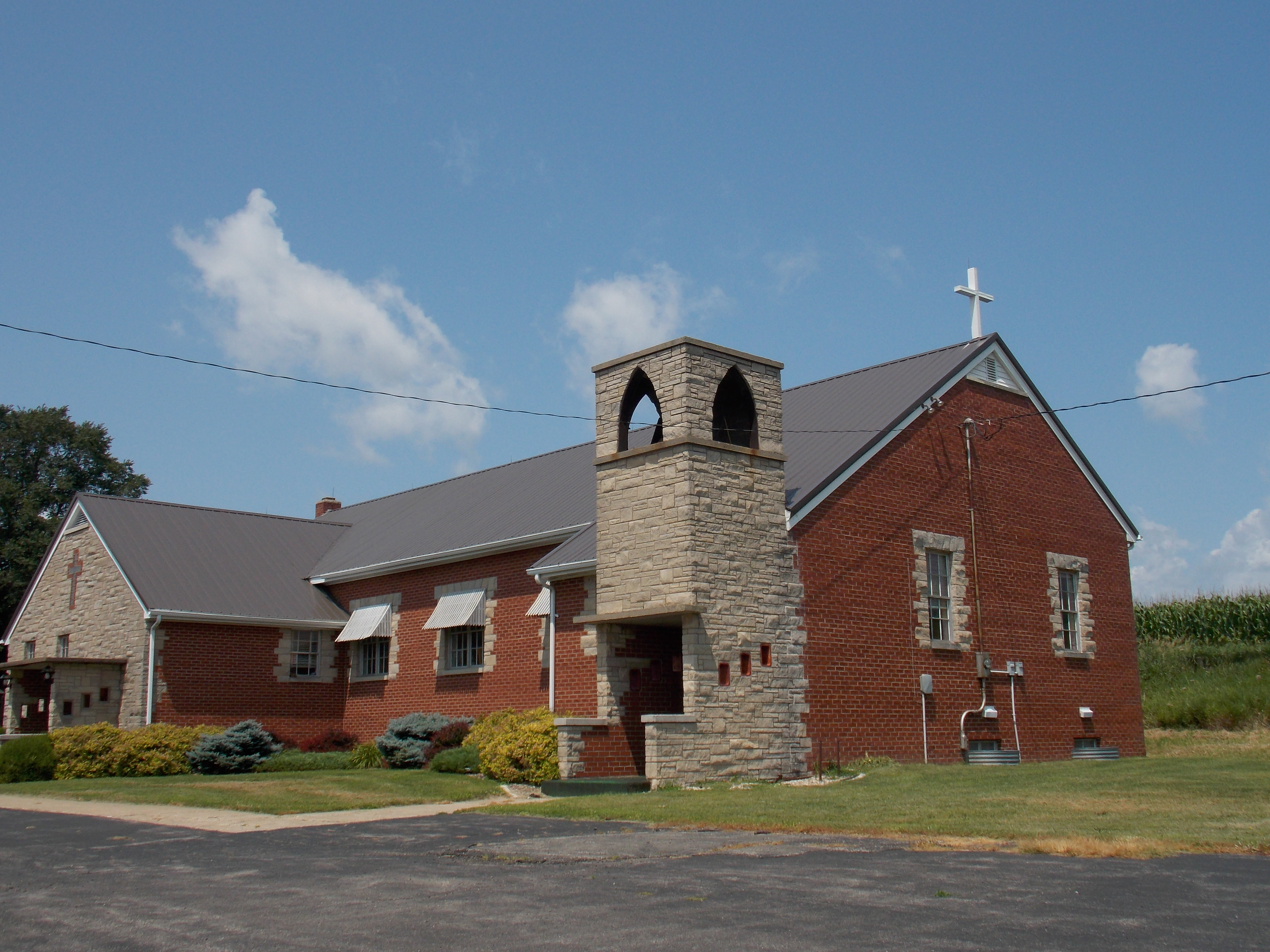
- Elwood United Methodist Church

- Location within the state of Iowa Elwood, Iowa (the United States)
- Coordinates: 41°59′30″N 90°44′21″W
- Country: United States
- State: Iowa
- County: Clinton
- Elevation: 738 ft (225 m)
- Time zone: UTC-6 (Central (CST))
  - Summer (DST): UTC-5 (CDT)
- Area code: 563
- GNIS feature ID: 456353

Elwood is an unincorporated community in northwestern Clinton County, Iowa, United States. It lies along Iowa Highway 136, northwest of the city of Clinton, the county seat of Clinton County, and 5 miles (8 km) east of Lost Nation. Its elevation is 738 feet (225 m).

== History ==
It once possessed a post office, established in 1871. Elwood was named in honor of Kinsey Elwood, who platted the town in 1873.

The population was 100 in 1940.
