= Brookfield Township, Clinton County, Iowa =

Township in Iowa, US

Brookfield Township
- Township
- Location in Clinton County
- Coordinates: 41°59′29″N 090°43′21″W
- Country: United States
- State: Iowa
- County: Clinton

Area
  - Total: 36.37 sq mi (94.19 km^{2})
  - Land: 36.37 sq mi (94.19 km^{2})
  - Water: 0 sq mi (0 km^{2}) 0%
- Elevation: 750 ft (230 m)

Population (2000)
  - Total: 428
  - Density: 12/sq mi (4.5/km^{2})
- GNIS feature ID: 0467491

Brookfield Township is a township in Clinton County, Iowa, United States. As of the 2000 census, its population was 428.

== Geography ==
Brookfield Township covers an area of 36.37 square miles (94.2 km^{2}) and contains no incorporated settlements. According to the USGS, it contains two cemeteries: Elwood and Union.

The stream of Elwood Creek runs through this township.
