= Gilbert Klefstad =

American politician

Member of the Iowa Senate from the 13th district
- In office January 9, 1967 – January 12, 1969
- Preceded by: Joseph Flatt
- Succeeded by: Thomas J. Frey; James W. Griffin

Member of the Iowa Senate from the 15th district
- In office January 11, 1965 – January 9, 1967
- Preceded by: Vera Shivvers
- Succeeded by: Joseph W. Cassidy; Roger Jepsen

Member of the Iowa House of Representatives from the 31st district
- In office January 12, 1959 – January 8, 1961
- Preceded by: Thomas J. Frey; Judson Perkins
- Succeeded by: Harry Gittins; Richard Stageman

Personal details
- Born: May 20, 1919 Felch, Michigan
- Died: August 8, 2007 (aged 88) Council Bluffs, Iowa
- Party: Democratic

Gilbert Klefstad (May 20, 1919 – August 8, 2007) was an American politician who served in the Iowa House of Representatives from the 31st district from 1959 to 1961 and in the Iowa Senate from 1965 to 1969.

He died on August 8, 2007, in Council Bluffs, Iowa at age 88.
