= Elk River Township, Clinton County, Iowa =

Township in Iowa, US

Elk River Township
- Township
- Location in Clinton County
- Coordinates: 41°59′24″N 090°13′56″W
- Country: United States
- State: Iowa
- County: Clinton

Area
  - Total: 51.87 sq mi (134.34 km^{2})
  - Land: 45.87 sq mi (118.81 km^{2})
  - Water: 6.00 sq mi (15.54 km^{2}) 11.57%
- Elevation: 666 ft (203 m)

Population (2000)
  - Total: 828
  - Density: 18/sq mi (7/km^{2})
- GNIS feature ID: 0467782

Elk River Township is a township in Clinton County, Iowa, United States. As of the 2000 census, its population was 828.

== History ==
The first settlers intended to name their new township Fair Haven Township, because many of them were natives of Fair Haven, Connecticut. It was then decided upon organization of this township to name it from the Elk River (Iowa), where many elk horns were found at the time of settlement.

== Geography ==
Elk River Township covers an area of 51.87 square miles (134.3 km^{2}) and contains one incorporated settlement, Andover. According to the USGS, it contains five cemeteries: Andover, Hauntown, Smith, Teeds Grove and Wilson.

The streams of Cook Slough, Dark Chute, Elk River, North Branch Elk River, Schramling Creek and Silver Creek run through this township.
