= Bryant, Iowa =

- Unincorporated community
- Location within the state of Iowa Bryant, Iowa (the United States)
- Coordinates: 41°57′48″N 90°19′48″W
- Country: United States
- State: Iowa
- County: Clinton
- Elevation: 804 ft (245 m)
- Time zone: UTC-6 (Central (CST))
  - Summer (DST): UTC-5 (CDT)
- ZIP codes: 52727
- GNIS feature ID: 454902

Bryant is an unincorporated community in northeastern Clinton County, Iowa, United States. It lies along local roads northwest of the city of Clinton, the county seat of Clinton County. Its elevation is 804 feet (245 m). Bryant is unincorporated, with the ZIP code of 52727, which opened as Ten Mile House on 25 August 1870 and changed its name to Bryant on 15 March 1871.

== History ==
Bryant was platted in 1871. It was named for William Cullen Bryant, a New York newspaper editor. The population was 60 in 1940.
