= Clinton County Courthouse (Iowa) =

- U.S. National Register of Historic Places
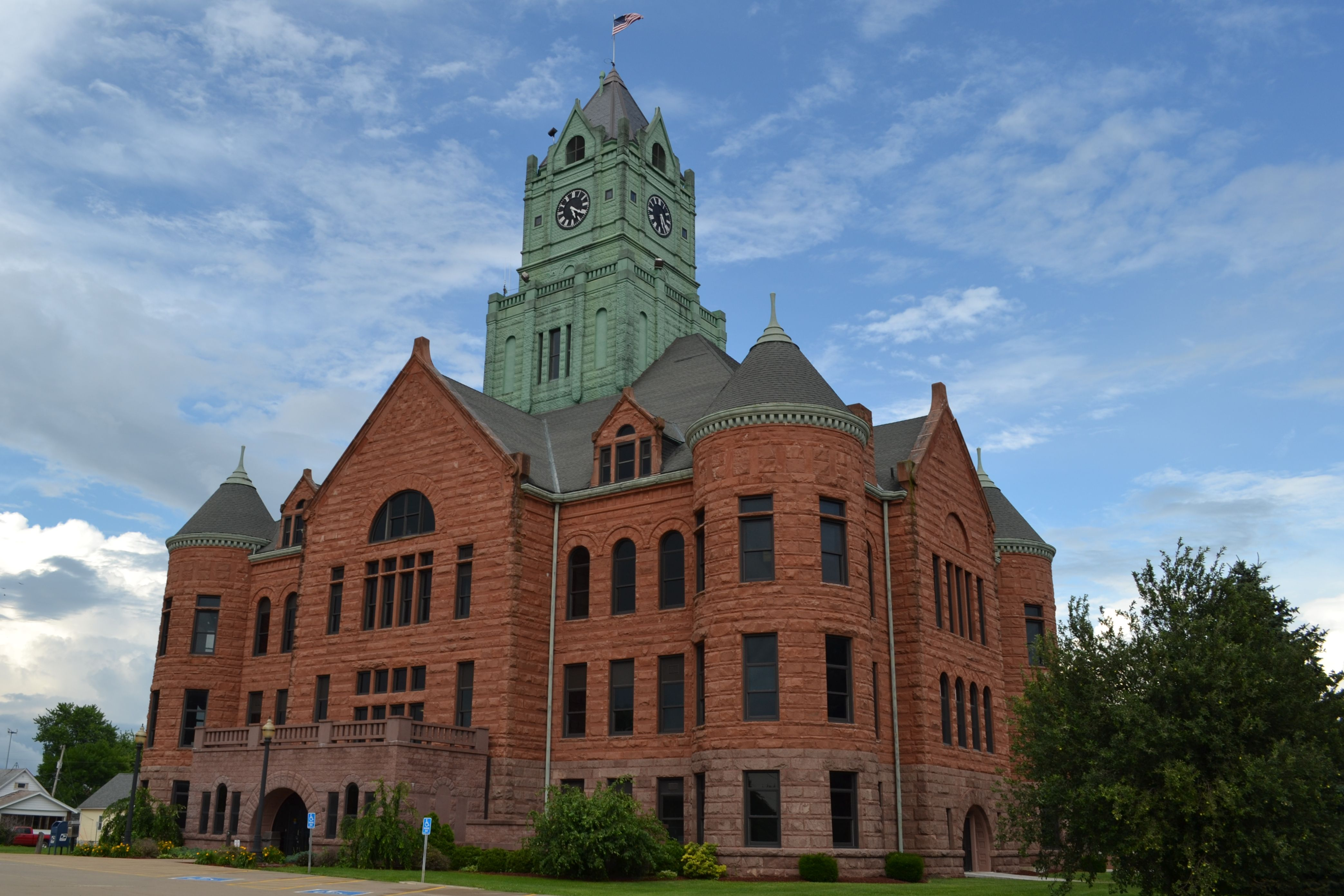
- The Clinton County courthouse in Clinton

- Location within Iowa Location within the United States
- Interactive map showing the location of Clinton County Courthouse
- Location: Between 6th and 7th Aves. Clinton, Iowa
- Coordinates: 41°51′2″N 90°11′17″W
- Area: less than one acre
- Built: 1897
- Architect: G.S. Mansfield
- Architectural style: Romanesque, Richardsonian Romanesque
- MPS: County Courthouses in Iowa TR
- NRHP reference No.: 81000230
- Added to NRHP: July 2, 1981

Clinton County Courthouse is located in Clinton, Iowa, United States. It was built in 1897 and added to the National Register of Historic Places July 2, 1981, as a part of the County Courthouses in Iowa Thematic Resource. It is the fourth courthouse that has been used by the county.

== History ==
=== Former courthouses ===
The town of Camanche became the first county seat around 1840. Hotels and houses were used for county business instead of a dedicated courthouse. In 1841, the legislature of the Territory of Iowa allowed for the relocation of the county seat and a new townsite in the center of the county called Vanderburg was chosen. A frame building was donated for court purposes. The following year the town's name was changed to DeWitt to further honor DeWitt Clinton, for whom the county was named. A planned brick courthouse that would have cost $3,500 was never built due to a lack of support. As the size of the county government increased, court sessions were moved to the attic of the frame building while county offices occupied the rest of the building. The Exchange Hotel was acquired by the county in 1846 for more space. The county constructed a second courthouse in DeWitt measuring 40 by 50 feet (12 m × 15 m) in 1854 for $6,000. It was similar in design to the Greek Revival Scott County Courthouse (1842) in Davenport. The contractors for the project were S.N. Bedford and T.P. & S.M. Butler. Its construction was unpopular as it was ordered by the county judge rather than the people. A jail was built in 1855.

The former Exchange Hotel was destroyed in a fire in 1865. By then the population in the eastern part of the county, and in the city of Clinton in particular, had grown substantially. The decision to move the county seat there was made and a new courthouse, which measured 44 by 52 feet (13 m × 16 m), was built in 1869. It was a two-story structure that was built in 23 days, and it was initially rented by the county. By 1878 the building was too small and another building was built on its west side to house some county offices.

=== Present courthouse ===
Money to build the present courthouse was allocated in 1892. Poor construction and quicksand forced the foundation to be re-built. A new architect and contractor were hired and elections were held to approve additional funds, which all delayed construction. The building was finally completed in 1897 at a cost of $168,000. The design by M.S. Mansfield in the Richardsonian Romanesque style, beat eight other entrants in a design competition for the new courthouse. It is constructed of red sandstone and granite with copper covering the large central tower. The building also features a hip roof with dormers, parapet gable ends, and corner towers that are capped with a conical roof. Its historical significance is derived from its association with county government, and the political power and prestige of Clinton as the county seat.

In August 2017, engineers found that one of the beams in the basement that supports the first floor failed due to regular wear. The courthouse was closed for two weeks so repairs could be made. Offices and court functions were temporarily moved to the county administration building.
