= Teeds Grove, Iowa =

- Unincorporated community
- Location within the state of Iowa Teeds Grove, Iowa (the United States)
- Coordinates: 42°0′42″N 90°14′51″W
- Country: United States
- State: Iowa
- County: Clinton
- Elevation: 692 ft (211 m)
- Time zone: UTC-6 (Central (CST))
  - Summer (DST): UTC-5 (CDT)
- ZIP codes: 52771
- Area code: 563
- GNIS feature ID: 462186

Teeds Grove is an unincorporated community in northeastern Clinton County, Iowa, United States. It lies at the intersection of Clinton County Routes E44 and Z50, north of the city of Clinton, the county seat of Clinton County. Its elevation is 692 feet (211 m).

== History ==
Teeds Grove (formerly Teed's Grove, with the apostrophe s) was named after the first settler of Elk River Township.

Teeds Grove's post office has a complicated history. Established on 6 January 1873, its name was changed to Teeds on 21 June 1883 and changed back to Teeds Grove on 8 July 1904. The post office was ultimately discontinued on 2 July 1965, when it was attached to the Clinton post office. Although its post office is gone, Teeds Grove retains its own ZIP Code, 52771.

Teeds Grove's population was 66 in 1902, and 75 in 1925. The population was 60 in 1940.
