= Elvira, Iowa =

- Unincorporated community
- Location within the state of Iowa Elvira, Iowa (the United States)
- Coordinates: 41°51′32″N 90°21′19″W
- Country: United States
- State: Iowa
- County: Clinton
- Time zone: UTC-6 (Central (CST))
  - Summer (DST): UTC-5 (CDT)
- ZIP codes: 52732
- Area code: 563

Elvira is an unincorporated community in Clinton County, Iowa, United States. It falls within the Clinton zip code (52732).

== History ==
Elvira was platted in 1854. It was named by W. H. Gibbs, the owner of the town site, in honor of his wife. Elvira's population was 31 in 1902, and 37 in 1925. The population was 150 in 1940.
