= Clinton Municipal Transit Administration =

Mass transportation provider in Iowa, US

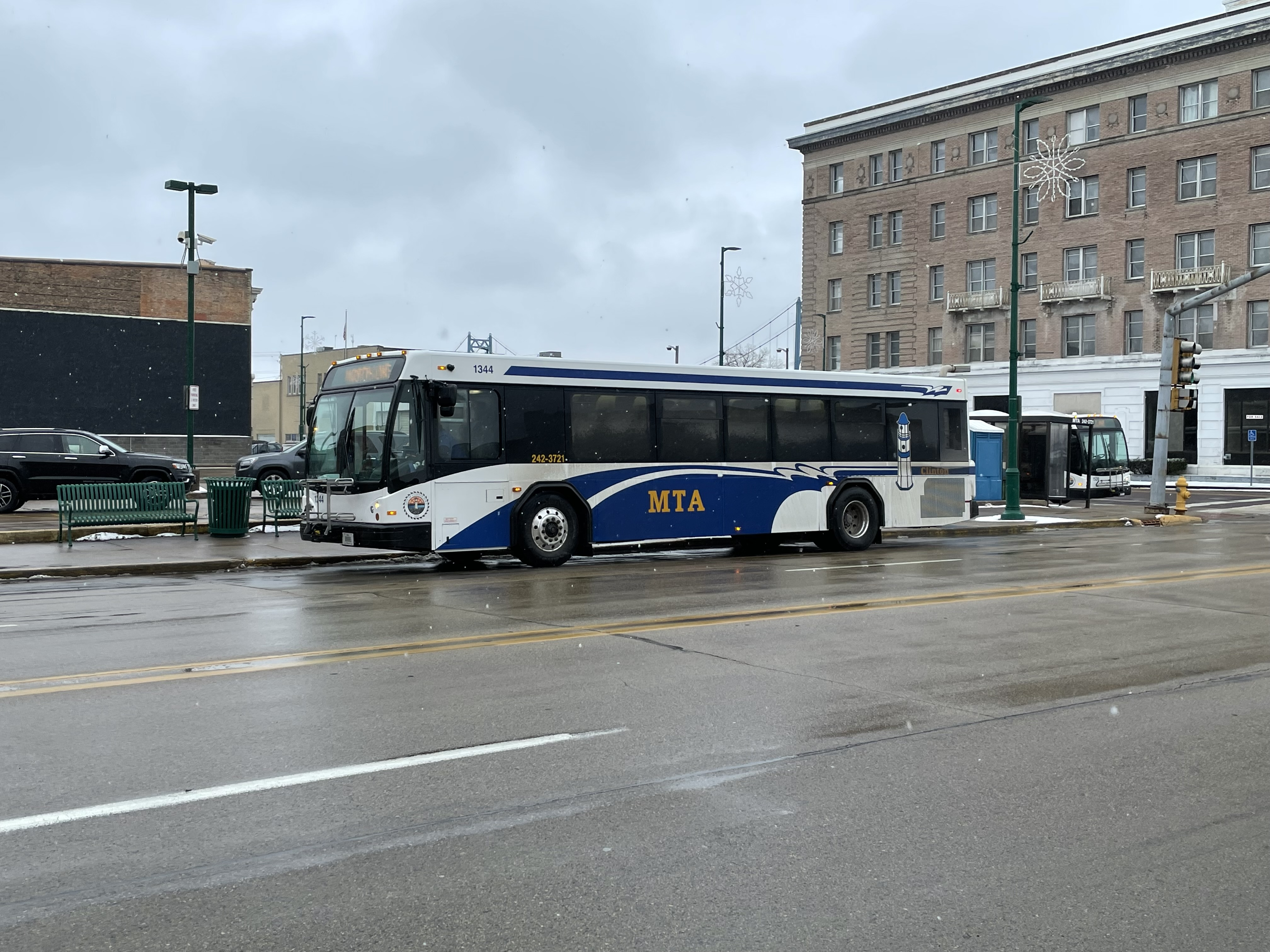
- A Clinton MTA bus waits at the Central Transfer Point in downtown Clinton
- Headquarters: 1320 South Second Street
- Locale: Clinton, Iowa
- Service area: Clinton County, Iowa
- Service type: Bus service, paratransit
- Routes: 6
- Fleet: 25 vehicles
- Annual ridership: 224,657 (2023)
- Website: cityofclintoniowa.gov/215/MTA-Transit

The Clinton Municipal Transit Administration or MTA is the primary provider of mass transportation in Clinton, Iowa, with six routes serving the region. As of 2023, the system provided 224,657 rides over 25,780 annual vehicle revenue hours with 7 buses and 6 paratransit vehicles.

== History ==
Public transit in the Clinton area began in the form of horse cars starting in 1869, operated by the Lyons Horse Railway Co. Between 1891 and 1896, the horse cars were replaced by electric streetcars, which in turn were replaced with buses in 1937.

Due to the COVID-19 pandemic, the Clinton MTA reduced service hours for a time beginning March 30, 2020, to ensure safety of riders and operators. Unusual for such a small system, the MTA offers a live bus map for riders.

== Service ==
Clinton MTA operates six weekday bus routes on a pulse system with all routes except the Lincolnway Shuttle leaving the Central Transfer Point on the hour and half hour. Hours of operation are Monday through Friday from 6:00 A.M. to 6:00 P.M. and on Saturday from 8:00 A.M. to 3:30 P.M. There is no service on Sundays. Regular fares are $1.00, and $0.75 for students, those with disabilities, and seniors.

== Fleet ==
Fleet number(s)	Year	Manufacturer	Model	Notes
T470	1997	Dupont Industries	Champlain Trolley	
0941-0942	2009	Gillig	Low Floor 35'	
1045-1049	2010	Gillig	Low Floor 35'	1047 retired
1240	2012	Gillig	Low Floor 29'	
1344	2013	Gillig	Low Floor 35'	
1539	2015	Gillig	Low Floor 29'	
2043	2020	Gillig	Low Floor 35'	

== Fixed Route Ridership ==
The ridership statistics shown here are of fixed route services only and do not include demand response.

== See also ==
- List of bus transit systems in the United States
- Bettendorf Transit
