= Hampshire Township, Clinton County, Iowa =

Township in Iowa, US

Hampshire Township
- Township
- Location in Clinton County
- Coordinates: 41°54′15″N 090°15′06″W
- Country: United States
- State: Iowa
- County: Clinton

Area
  - Total: 39.45 sq mi (102.18 km^{2})
  - Land: 36.80 sq mi (95.31 km^{2})
  - Water: 2.66 sq mi (6.88 km^{2}) 6.73%
- Elevation: 728 ft (222 m)

Population (2000)
  - Total: 877
  - Density: 24/sq mi (9.2/km^{2})
- GNIS feature ID: 0467995

Hampshire Township is a township in Clinton County, Iowa, United States. As of the 2000 census, its population was 877.

== History ==
Hampshire Township was organized in 1857.

== Geography ==
Hampshire Township covers an area of 39.45 square miles (102.2 km^{2}) and contains no incorporated settlements. According to the USGS, it contains three cemeteries: Dierks, Holy Cross and Pleasant Hill.
