= Andover, Iowa =

- City
- Location of Andover, Iowa
- Coordinates: 41°58′49″N 90°15′02″W
- Country: United States
- State: Iowa
- County: Clinton

Area
  - Total: 0.18 sq mi (0.46 km^{2})
  - Land: 0.18 sq mi (0.46 km^{2})
  - Water: 0 sq mi (0.00 km^{2})
- Elevation: 728 ft (222 m)

Population (2020)
  - Total: 109
  - Density: 608.5/sq mi (234.94/km^{2})
- Time zone: UTC-6 (Central (CST))
  - Summer (DST): UTC-5 (CDT)
- ZIP code: 52701
- Area code: 563
- FIPS code: 19-02080
- GNIS feature ID: 2393955
- Website: cityofandover.org

Andover is a city in Clinton County, Iowa, United States. The population was 109 at the 2020 census.

== History ==
Andover was platted in 1886, and incorporated as a town in 1910. It was named by a railroad official after Andover, Vermont.

Andover's population was 83 in 1925. The population was 76 in 1940.

== Geography ==
According to the United States Census Bureau, the city has a total area of 0.19 square miles (0.49 km^{2}), all land.

== Demographics ==
Historical populations
Year	Pop.	±%
1910	51	—
1920	83	+62.7%
1930	76	−8.4%
1940	72	−5.3%
1950	80	+11.1%
1960	91	+13.7%
1970	90	−1.1%
1980	107	+18.9%
1990	99	−7.5%
2000	87	−12.1%
2010	103	+18.4%
2020	109	+5.8%
Source:"U.S. Census website". United States Census Bureau. and Iowa Data Center; Source: U.S. Decennial Census

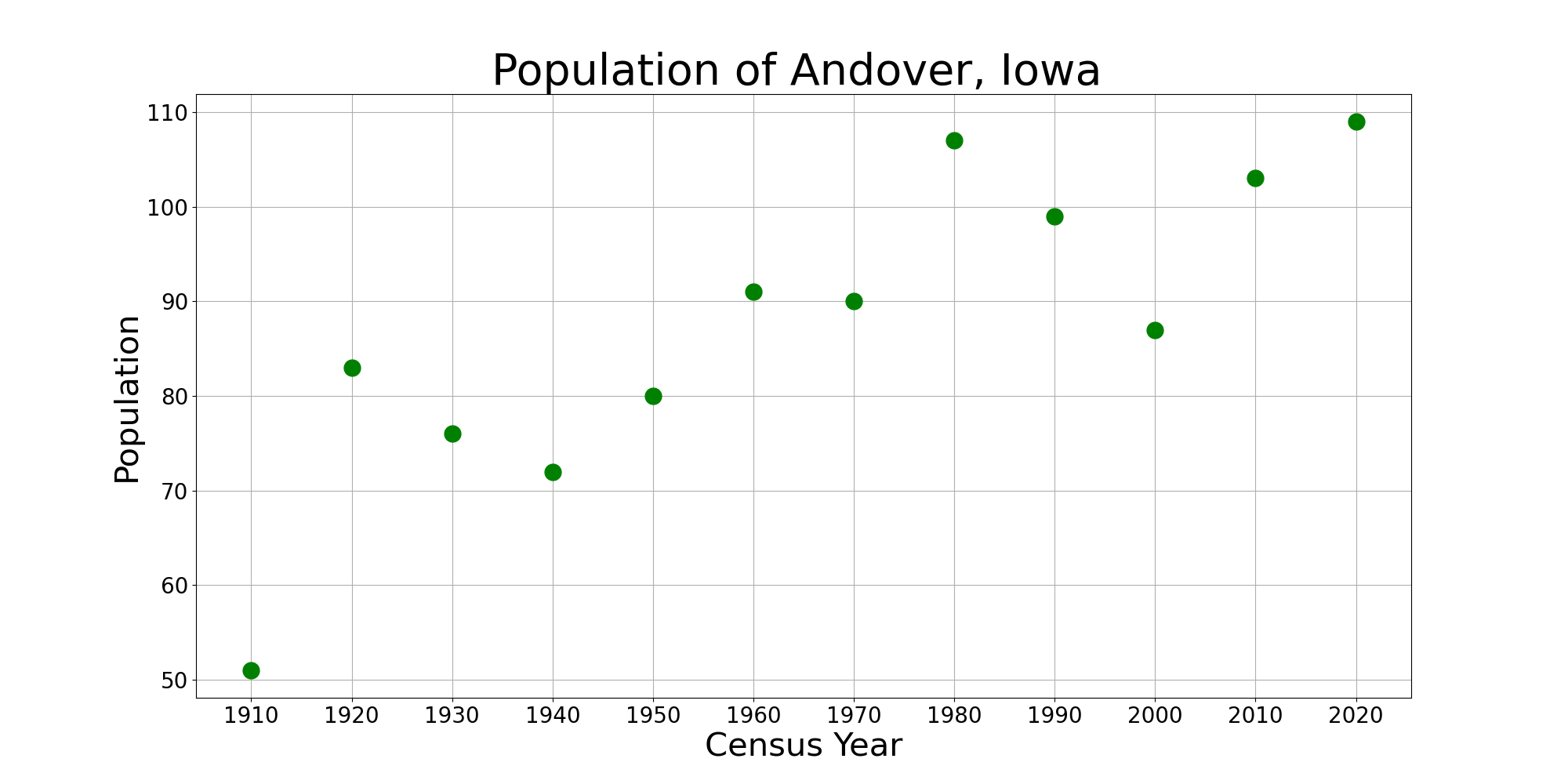
The population of Andover, Iowa from US census data

=== 2020 census ===
As of the census of 2020, there were 109 people, 35 households, and 28 families residing in the city. The population density was 608.5 inhabitants per square mile (234.9/km^{2}). There were 39 housing units at an average density of 217.7 per square mile (84.1/km^{2}). The racial makeup of the city was 94.5% White, 0.0% Black or African American, 0.0% Native American, 0.0% Asian, 0.0% Pacific Islander, 0.0% from other races and 5.5% from two or more races. Hispanic or Latino persons of any race comprised 0.0% of the population.

Of the 35 households, 45.7% of which had children under the age of 18 living with them, 65.7% were married couples living together, 8.6% were cohabitating couples, 2.9% had a female householder with no spouse or partner present and 22.9% had a male householder with no spouse or partner present. 20.0% of all households were non-families. 14.3% of all households were made up of individuals, 0.0% had someone living alone who was 65 years old or older.

The median age in the city was 32.5 years. 36.7% of the residents were under the age of 20; 3.7% were between the ages of 20 and 24; 29.4% were from 25 and 44; 20.2% were from 45 and 64; and 10.1% were 65 years of age or older. The gender makeup of the city was 54.1% male and 45.9% female.

=== 2010 census ===
As of the census of 2010, there were 103 people, 38 households, and 27 families living in the city. The population density was 542.1 inhabitants per square mile (209.3/km^{2}). There were 40 housing units at an average density of 210.5 per square mile (81.3/km^{2}). The racial makeup of the city was 100.0% White.

There were 38 households, of which 47.4% had children under the age of 18 living with them, 52.6% were married couples living together, 10.5% had a female householder with no husband present, 7.9% had a male householder with no wife present, and 28.9% were non-families. 18.4% of all households were made up of individuals, and 18.4% had someone living alone who was 65 years of age or older. The average household size was 2.71 and the average family size was 3.15.

The median age in the city was 30.5 years. 29.1% of residents were under the age of 18; 7.8% were between the ages of 18 and 24; 35% were from 25 to 44; 14.6% were from 45 to 64; and 13.6% were 65 years of age or older. The gender makeup of the city was 43.7% male and 56.3% female.

=== 2000 census ===
As of the census of 2000, there were 87 people, 39 households, and 26 families living in the city. The population density was 439.9 inhabitants per square mile (169.8/km^{2}). There were 40 housing units at an average density of 202.3 per square mile (78.1/km^{2}). The racial makeup of the city was 94.25% White, and 5.75% from two or more races.

There were 39 households, out of which 35.9% had children under the age of 18 living with them, 51.3% were married couples living together, 7.7% had a female householder with no husband present, and 33.3% were non-families. 30.8% of all households were made up of individuals, and 23.1% had someone living alone who was 65 years of age or older. The average household size was 2.23 and the average family size was 2.77.

In the city, the population was spread out, with 26.4% under the age of 18, 4.6% from 18 to 24, 31.0% from 25 to 44, 17.2% from 45 to 64, and 20.7% who were 65 years of age or older. The median age was 40 years. For every 100 females, there were 97.7 males. For every 100 females age 18 and over, there were 120.7 males.

The median income for a household in the city was $33,750, and the median income for a family was $36,250. Males had a median income of $31,250 versus $19,167 for females. The per capita income for the city was $19,843. There were 8.0% of families and 3.3% of the population living below the poverty line, including 5.9% of under eighteens and none of those over 64.

== Education ==
The Northeast Community School District operates public schools serving the community.
