= Welton, Iowa =

- City
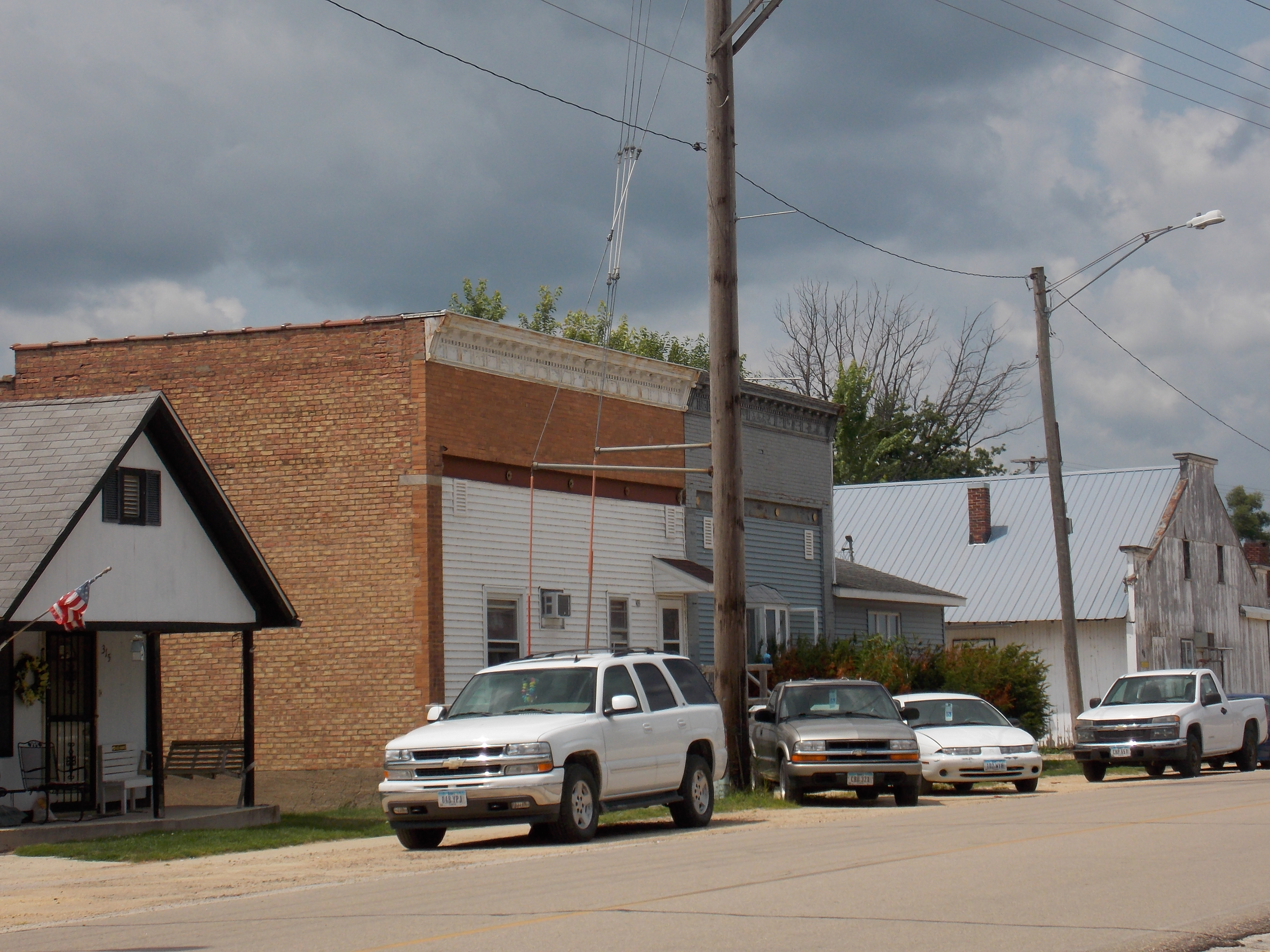
- Street in downtown Welton

- Location of Welton, Iowa
- Coordinates: 41°54′29″N 90°35′49″W
- Country: United States
- State: Iowa
- County: Clinton

Area
  - Total: 0.28 sq mi (0.72 km^{2})
  - Land: 0.28 sq mi (0.72 km^{2})
  - Water: 0 sq mi (0.00 km^{2})
- Elevation: 692 ft (211 m)

Population (2020)
  - Total: 121
  - Density: 437.4/sq mi (168.87/km^{2})
- Time zone: UTC-6 (Central (CST))
  - Summer (DST): UTC-5 (CDT)
- ZIP code: 52774
- Area code: 563
- FIPS code: 19-83370
- GNIS feature ID: 2397254
- Website: www.cityofwelton.com

Welton is a city in Clinton County, Iowa, United States. The population was 121 at the time of the 2020 census.

The community is located adjacent to U.S. Route 61, which bypasses Welton just to the east of the city. Prior to the expansion of Highway 61 to a four-lane highway, it passed directly through the city. Following reconstruction of U.S. 61, a new truck stop was built adjacent to U.S. 61 near the southern edge of the city.

== History ==
Welton got its start in the year 1871, following construction of the Davenport and St. Paul Railroad through the territory.

== Education ==
Welton is one of the communities in the Central DeWitt Community School District, which spans a large portion of central Clinton County; it was known as the Central Clinton Community School District until July 1, 2014.

For more than 40 years, the district operated Welton Elementary School to serve students in the north-central part of the district, with junior high and high school students being bused to DeWitt. According to the Quad City Times, "the 85-year-old school closed in 2005 because of budget constraints and declining enrollment," and on April 5, 2006 the 85-year-old Welton School building was demolished. Until 1961, the school building also housed junior high and high school students as part of the Welton Independent School District; sports teams were known as the Wolverines. The junior-senior high school was closed in 1961, when Welton, along with the former Grand Mound and DeWitt school districts, consolidated to form the Central Community School District.

Welton Elementary had three buildings. The third floor of the main building had a computer laboratory, a library, and a media center. In addition to the main building, there was an art room and teacher's lounge facility, and a modular facility with two classrooms. Welton Elementary had 217 students in the 1998–1999 school year. Grand Mound Elementary students used the library, media and computer facilities at Welton Elementary. The district at one time considered expanding Welton Elementary to upper elementary levels but decided against it since it deemed the building too out of date and architecturally difficult to renovate, citing narrow staircases which would have difficulty accommodating chairlifts and the multi-story design. Welton was not fully accessible to handicapped students.

Circa 2001 there was a bond proposal to expand the elementary schools in DeWitt, which would have centralized services and facilities for the handicapped, and close the schools in Grand Mound and Welton. Welton Elementary closed in the summer of 2005, and was demolished in 2006. A historic newspaper was found inside the cornerstone, and the City of Welton government received the school memorabilia.

== Geography ==
According to the United States Census Bureau, the city has a total area of 0.27 square miles (0.70 km^{2}), all land.

== Demographics ==
Historical populations
Year	Pop.	±%
1880	79	—
1910	69	−12.7%
1920	69	+0.0%
1930	80	+15.9%
1940	100	+25.0%
1950	93	−7.0%
1960	88	−5.4%
1970	104	+18.2%
1980	119	+14.4%
1990	184	+54.6%
2000	159	−13.6%
2010	165	+3.8%
2020	121	−26.7%
Source:"U.S. Census website". United States Census Bureau. and Iowa Data Center; Source: U.S. Decennial Census

=== 2020 census ===
As of the census of 2020, there were 121 people, 62 households, and 48 families residing in the city. The population density was 437.4 inhabitants per square mile (168.9/km^{2}). There were 64 housing units at an average density of 231.3 per square mile (89.3/km^{2}). The racial makeup of the city was 96.7% White, 0.0% Black or African American, 0.0% Native American, 0.8% Asian, 0.0% Pacific Islander, 0.8% from other races and 1.7% from two or more races. Hispanic or Latino persons of any race comprised 0.0% of the population.

Of the 62 households, 32.3% of which had children under the age of 18 living with them, 53.2% were married couples living together, 9.7% were cohabitating couples, 19.4% had a female householder with no spouse or partner present and 17.7% had a male householder with no spouse or partner present. 22.6% of all households were non-families. 16.1% of all households were made up of individuals, 1.6% had someone living alone who was 65 years old or older.

The median age in the city was 50.3 years. 18.2% of the residents were under the age of 20; 1.7% were between the ages of 20 and 24; 24.0% were from 25 and 44; 29.8% were from 45 and 64; and 26.4% were 65 years of age or older. The gender makeup of the city was 54.5% male and 45.5% female.

=== 2010 census ===
As of the census of 2010, there were 165 people, 61 households, and 49 families residing in the city. The population density was 611.1 inhabitants per square mile (235.9/km^{2}). There were 62 housing units at an average density of 229.6 per square mile (88.6/km^{2}). The racial makeup of the city was 96.4% White and 3.6% from two or more races. Hispanic or Latino of any race were 0.6% of the population.

There were 61 households, of which 41.0% had children under the age of 18 living with them, 57.4% were married couples living together, 13.1% had a female householder with no husband present, 9.8% had a male householder with no wife present, and 19.7% were non-families. 16.4% of all households were made up of individuals, and 6.6% had someone living alone who was 65 years of age or older. The average household size was 2.70 and the average family size was 2.94.

The median age in the city was 38.5 years. 27.9% of residents were under the age of 18; 4.9% were between the ages of 18 and 24; 29.7% were from 25 to 44; 25.4% were from 45 to 64; and 12.1% were 65 years of age or older. The gender makeup of the city was 47.3% male and 52.7% female.

=== 2000 census ===
As of the census of 2000, there were 159 people, 57 households, and 47 families residing in the city. The population density was 1,388.9 inhabitants per square mile (536.3/km^{2}). There were 60 housing units at an average density of 524.1 per square mile (202.4/km^{2}). The racial makeup of the city was 97.48% White, 0.63% African American, and 1.89% from two or more races. Hispanic or Latino of any race were 0.63% of the population.

There were 57 households, out of which 38.6% had children under the age of 18 living with them, 64.9% were married couples living together, 10.5% had a female householder with no husband present, and 15.8% were non-families. 12.3% of all households were made up of individuals, and 1.8% had someone living alone who was 65 years of age or older. The average household size was 2.79 and the average family size was 3.02.

In the city, the population was spread out, with 27.0% under the age of 18, 8.8% from 18 to 24, 28.9% from 25 to 44, 27.0% from 45 to 64, and 8.2% who were 65 years of age or older. The median age was 32 years. For every 100 females, there were 89.3 males. For every 100 females age 18 and over, there were 96.6 males.

The median income for a household in the city was $48,750, and the median income for a family was $42,500. Males had a median income of $39,688 versus $22,083 for females. The per capita income for the city was $17,680. None of the population or families were below the poverty line.
