= Grand Mound, Iowa =

- City
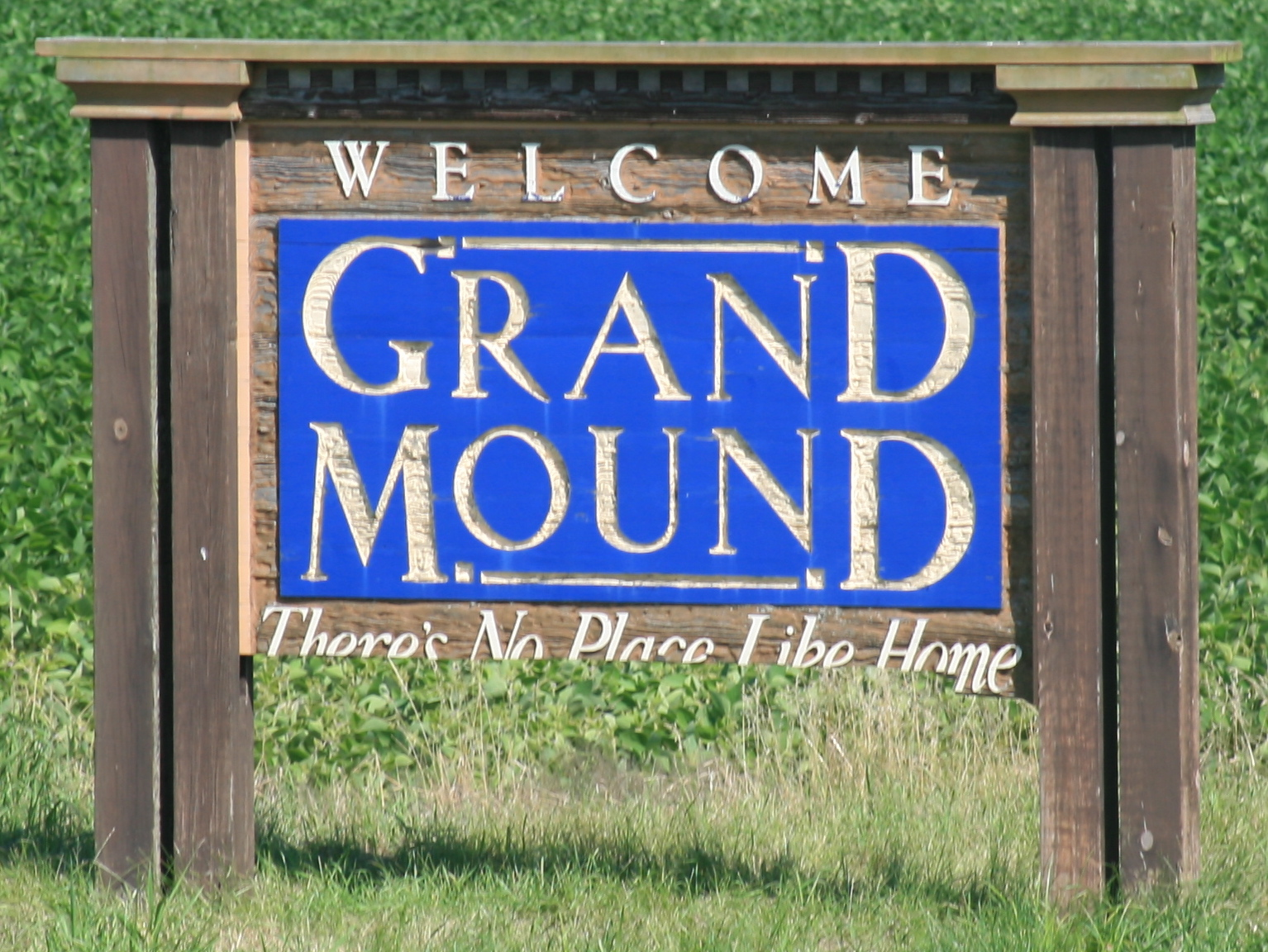
- City welcome sign

- Location of Grand Mound, Iowa
- Coordinates: 41°49′25″N 90°39′02″W
- Country: United States
- State: Iowa
- County: Clinton

Area
  - Total: 1.87 sq mi (4.85 km^{2})
  - Land: 1.87 sq mi (4.85 km^{2})
  - Water: 0 sq mi (0.00 km^{2})
- Elevation: 725 ft (221 m)

Population (2020)
  - Total: 615
  - Density: 328.6/sq mi (126.88/km^{2})
- Time zone: UTC-6 (Central (CST))
  - Summer (DST): UTC-5 (CDT)
- ZIP code: 52751
- Area code: 563
- FIPS code: 19-32025
- GNIS feature ID: 2394952
- Website: https://www.cityofgrandmound.org/

Grand Mound is a city in Clinton County, Iowa, United States. The population was 615 at the time of the 2020 census.

== History ==
The Chicago, Iowa and Nebraska Railroad was built through the town site in 1858, and a train station was built. Grand Mound was platted in 1866. Grand Mound was named for nearby Sand Mound; a recording error accounts for the error in spelling, which was never corrected. Legend has it, that it is the grandest of all mounds.

== Education ==
Grand Mound is part of the Central DeWitt Community School District, based in DeWitt, known as the Central Clinton Community School District until July 1, 2014.

Until 2001, elementary-aged students attended Grand Mound Elementary School with older students being bused to DeWitt.

Grand Mound Elementary was on a property of about 4 acres (1.6 ha) (35 rods, 10 feet by 18 rods). The first school building was built in 1917. Another school building, from 1954, had a cafeteria, a gymnasium, and two classrooms. In 1995 the district closed the original building because it was deemed to be structurally unsafe and its roof was in a poor condition. Circa 1999 that building was demolished. After the demolition the cafeteria began serving as an office, a school nurse area, and a reading and speech therapy instruction area. By 2001 Grand Mound Elementary served Kindergarten and the first grade. Grand Mound Elementary had 38 students in the 1998–1999 school year, and by 2001 the enrollment was down to 35. Grand Mound students used the library, media and computer facilities at Welton Elementary.

Circa 2001 there was a bond proposal to expand the elementary schools in DeWitt, which would have centralized services and facilities for the handicapped, and close the schools in Grand Mound and Welton. By 2002 the school closed, and was sold to God's Family Baptist Church. After the closure of Grand Mound (due to declining enrollment and concerns about the building's structural condition), students were bused to elementary schools in Welton and DeWitt; today (with Welton also closed), all elementary-aged students attend school in DeWitt.

Prior to the formation of the Central Clinton School District, Grand Mound had its own junior-senior high school, which operated in the same school building as the elementary school. Sports teams were known as the Cardinals. The last graduating senior class was in 1961, when Grand Mound—along with the Welton and DeWitt school districts—consolidated to form the Central Community School District.

== Geography ==
According to the United States Census Bureau, the city has a total area of 1.82 square miles (4.71 km^{2}), all land.

== Demographics ==
Historical populations
Year	Pop.	±%
1880	234	—
1890	247	+5.6%
1900	355	+43.7%
1910	428	+20.6%
1920	463	+8.2%
1930	438	−5.4%
1940	526	+20.1%
1950	526	+0.0%
1960	565	+7.4%
1970	627	+11.0%
1980	674	+7.5%
1990	619	−8.2%
2000	676	+9.2%
2010	642	−5.0%
2020	615	−4.2%
Source:"U.S. Census website". United States Census Bureau. and Iowa Data Center; Source: U.S. Decennial Census

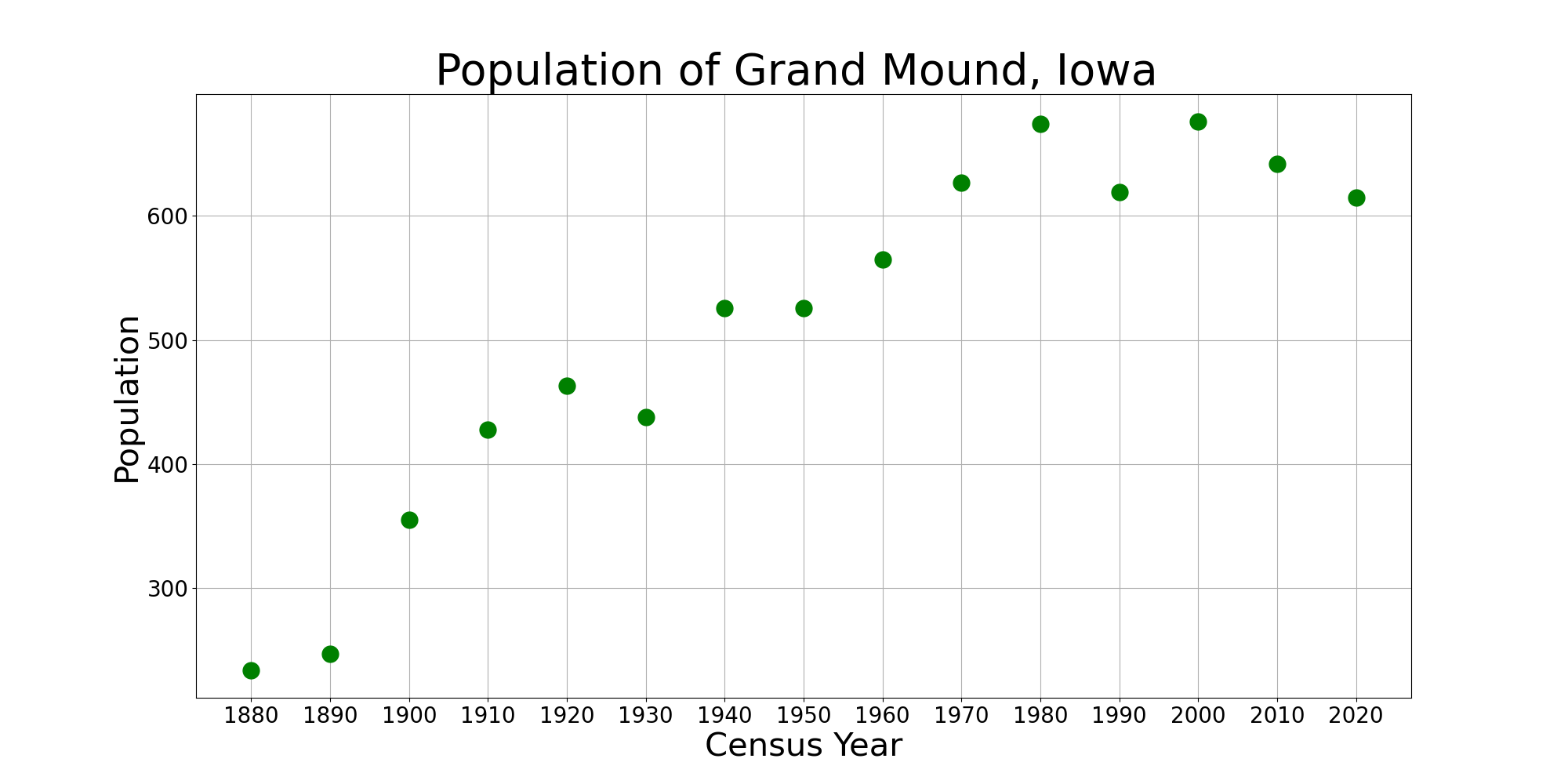
The population of Grand Mound, Iowa from US census data

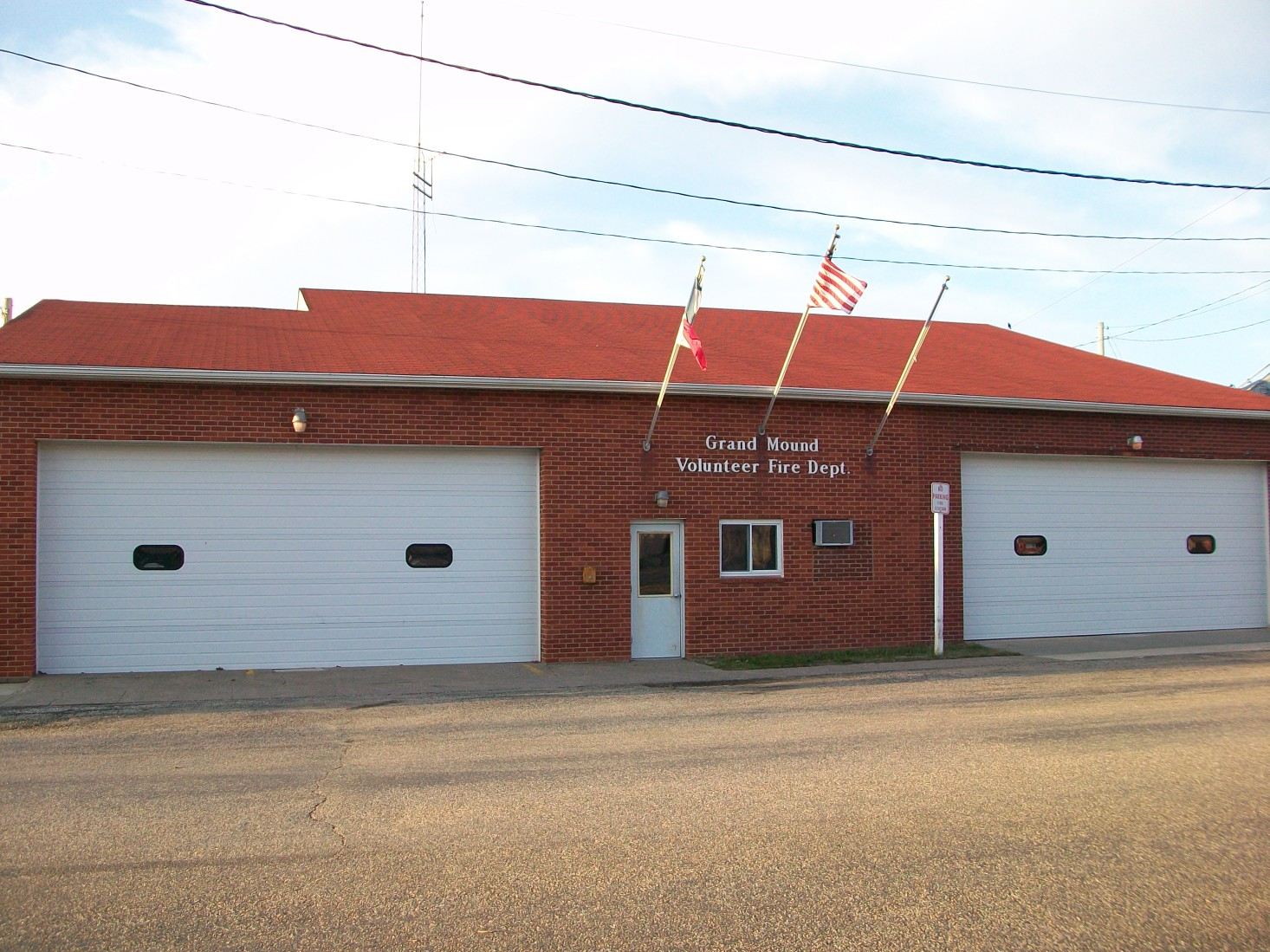
Volunteer Fire Department

=== 2020 census ===
As of the census of 2020, there were 615 people, 251 households, and 182 families residing in the city. The population density was 328.6 inhabitants per square mile (126.9/km^{2}). There were 257 housing units at an average density of 137.3 per square mile (53.0/km^{2}). The racial makeup of the city was 94.6% White, 0.5% Black or African American, 0.0% Native American, 0.2% Asian, 0.0% Pacific Islander, 0.7% from other races and 4.1% from two or more races. Hispanic or Latino persons of any race comprised 2.4% of the population.

Of the 251 households, 31.1% of which had children under the age of 18 living with them, 53.4% were married couples living together, 10.4% were cohabitating couples, 17.9% had a female householder with no spouse or partner present and 18.3% had a male householder with no spouse or partner present. 27.5% of all households were non-families. 21.9% of all households were made up of individuals, 8.4% had someone living alone who was 65 years old or older.

The median age in the city was 38.6 years. 26.0% of the residents were under the age of 20; 7.8% were between the ages of 20 and 24; 24.2% were from 25 and 44; 26.7% were from 45 and 64; and 15.3% were 65 years of age or older. The gender makeup of the city was 50.7% male and 49.3% female.

=== 2010 census ===
As of the census of 2010, there were 642 people, 243 households, and 185 families residing in the city. The population density was 352.7 inhabitants per square mile (136.2/km^{2}). There were 253 housing units at an average density of 139.0 per square mile (53.7/km^{2}). The racial makeup of the city was 98.9% White, 0.3% Asian, and 0.8% from two or more races. Hispanic or Latino of any race were 1.7% of the population.

There were 243 households, of which 34.6% had children under the age of 18 living with them, 63.4% were married couples living together, 7.8% had a female householder with no husband present, 4.9% had a male householder with no wife present, and 23.9% were non-families. 16.9% of all households were made up of individuals, and 7.4% had someone living alone who was 65 years of age or older. The average household size was 2.64 and the average family size was 2.99.

The median age in the city was 39.5 years. 24.1% of residents were under the age of 18; 10.4% were between the ages of 18 and 24; 23.4% were from 25 to 44; 28.3% were from 45 to 64; and 13.6% were 65 years of age or older. The gender makeup of the city was 50.9% male and 49.1% female.

=== 2000 census ===
As of the census of 2000, there were 675 people, 254 households, and 196 families residing in the city. The population density was 367.9 inhabitants per square mile (142.0/km^{2}). There were 260 housing units at an average density of 141.5 per square mile (54.6/km^{2}). The racial makeup of the city was 98.37% White, 0.15% Asian, and 1.48% from two or more races. Hispanic or Latino of any race were 1.33% of the population.

There were 254 households, out of which 38.6% had children under the age of 18 living with them, 65.7% were married couples living together, 6.7% had a female householder with no husband present, and 22.8% were non-families. 20.9% of all households were made up of individuals, and 10.2% had someone living alone who was 65 years of age or older. The average household size was 2.66 and the average family size was 3.08.

28.1% are under the age of 18, 7.5% from 18 to 24, 29.9% from 25 to 44, 22.9% from 45 to 64, and 11.5% who were 65 years of age or older. The median age was 35 years. For every 100 females, there were 100.6 males. For every 100 females age 18 and over, there were 96.0 males.

The median income for a household in the city was $42,411, and the median income for a family was $46,429. Males had a median income of $33,611 versus $20,250 for females. The per capita income for the city was $17,228. About 4.2% of families and 7.1% of the population were below the poverty line, including 9.6% of those under age 18 and 8.9% of those age 65 or over.
