= Charlotte, Iowa =

- City
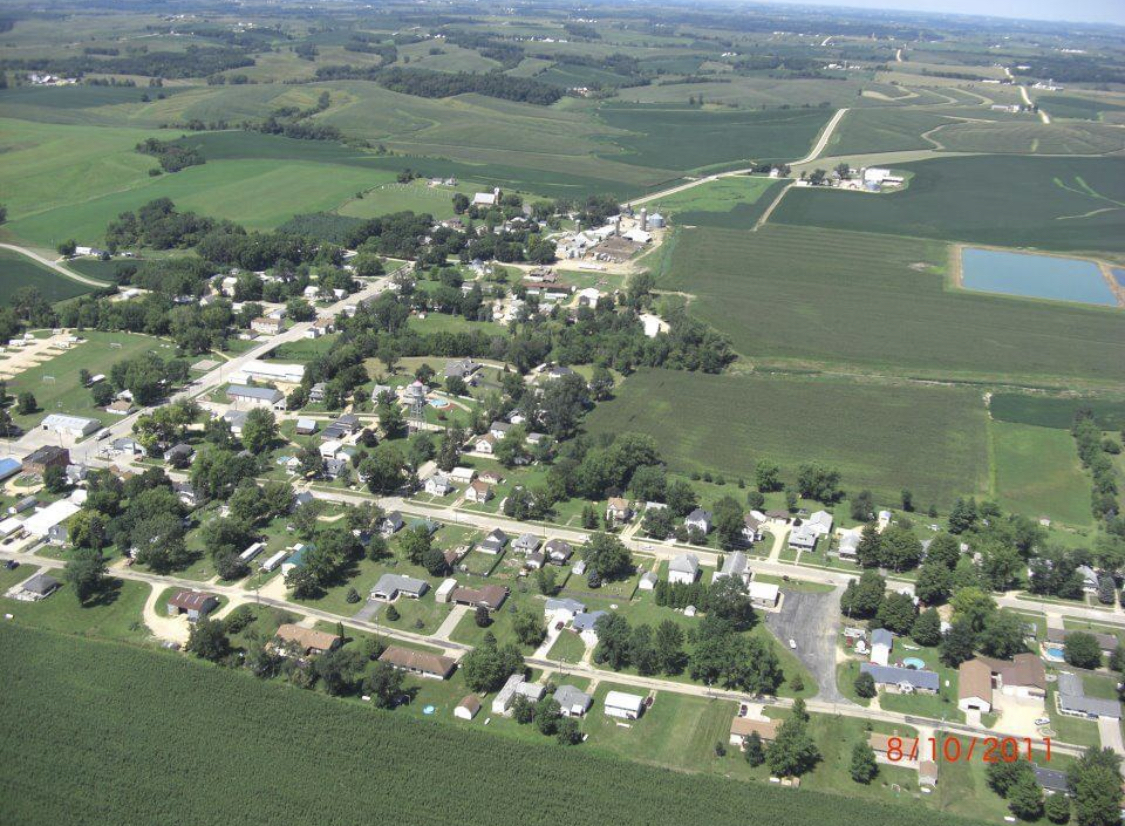
- Aerial view of Charlotte, Iowa
- Motto: Little Country Town, Big on Friendly
- Location of Charlotte, Iowa
- Coordinates: 41°57′44″N 90°28′06″W
- Country: United States
- State: Iowa
- County: Clinton
- Incorporated: December 5, 1904

Area
  - Total: 0.57 sq mi (1.48 km^{2})
  - Land: 0.57 sq mi (1.48 km^{2})
  - Water: 0 sq mi (0.00 km^{2})
- Elevation: 666 ft (203 m)

Population (2020)
  - Total: 389
  - Density: 681.0/sq mi (262.95/km^{2})
- Time zone: UTC-6 (Central (CST))
  - Summer (DST): UTC-5 (CDT)
- ZIP code: 52731
- Area code: 563
- FIPS code: 19-12855
- GNIS feature ID: 2393806
- Website: charlotte-iowa.com

Charlotte (/ʃɑːrˈlɒt/ shar-LOT) is a city in Clinton County, Iowa, United States. The population was 389 at the 2020 census.

== History ==
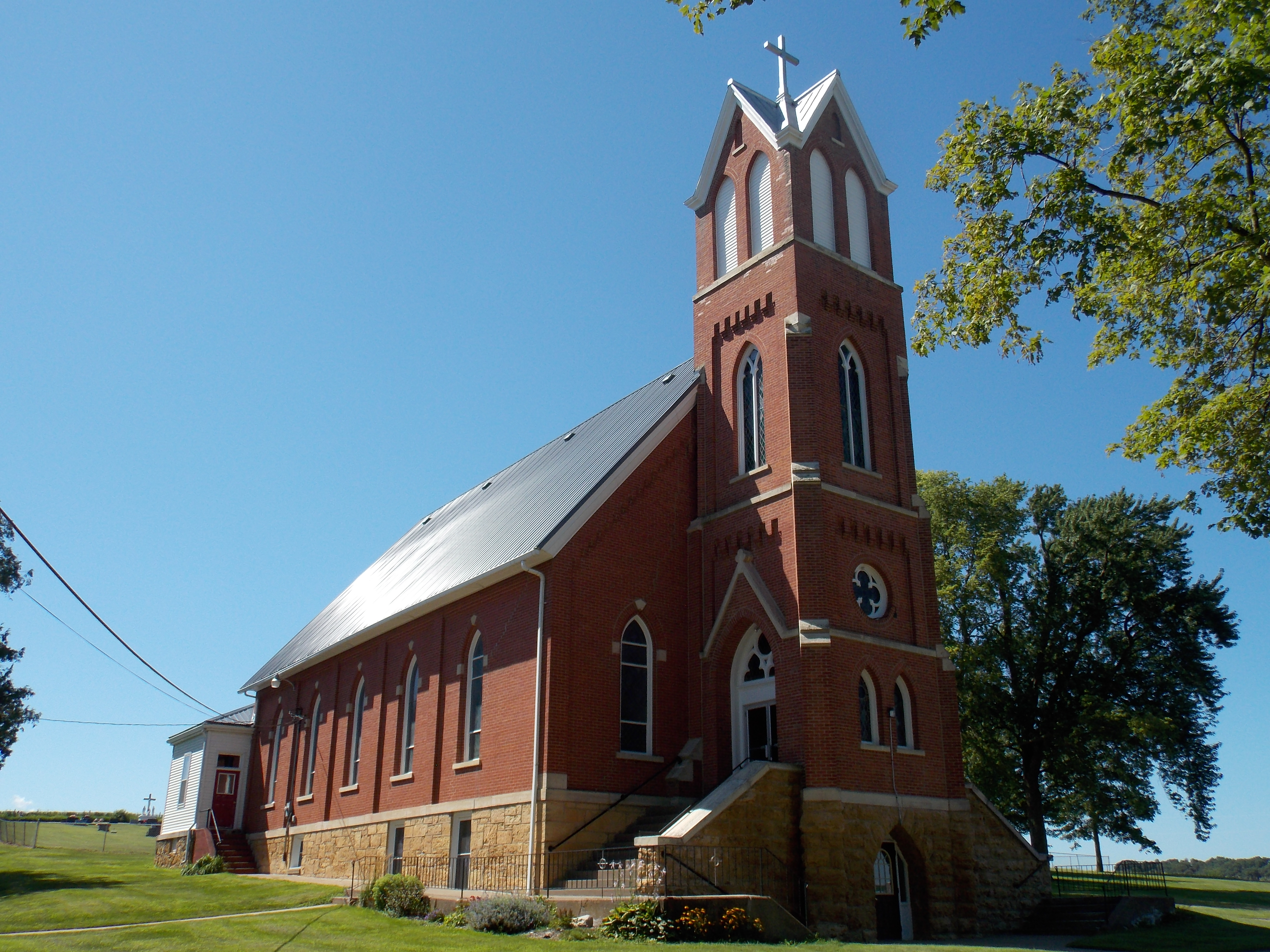
Assumption Catholic Church

Charlotte was platted in 1871; a post office already been established there in 1853. The town was named for the first postmaster's wife, Charlotte Gilmore.

== Geography ==
Charlotte's longitude and latitude coordinates in decimal form are 41.961163, -90.469704.

According to the United States Census Bureau, the city has a total area of 0.57 square miles (1.48 km^{2}), all land.

== Demographics ==
Historical populations
Year	Pop.	±%
1880	294	—
1910	356	+21.1%
1920	464	+30.3%
1930	407	−12.3%
1940	393	−3.4%
1950	427	+8.7%
1960	417	−2.3%
1970	444	+6.5%
1980	442	−0.5%
1990	359	−18.8%
2000	421	+17.3%
2010	394	−6.4%
2020	389	−1.3%
Source:"U.S. Census website". United States Census Bureau. and Iowa Data Center; Source: U.S. Decennial Census

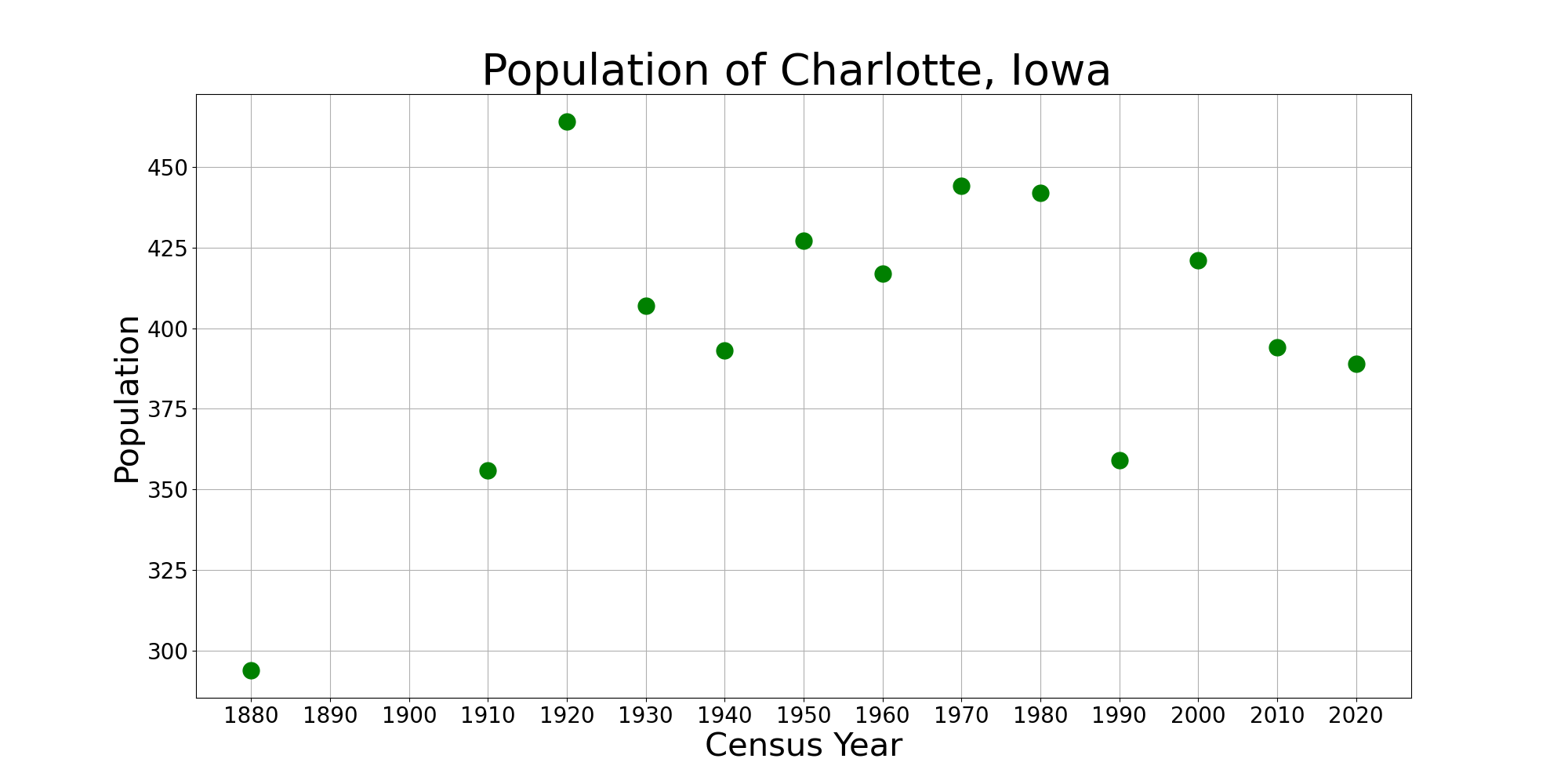
The population of Charlotte, Iowa from US census data

=== 2020 census ===
As of the census of 2020, there were 389 people, 157 households, and 117 families residing in the city. The population density was 681.0 inhabitants per square mile (263.0/km^{2}). There were 157 housing units at an average density of 274.9 per square mile (106.1/km^{2}). The racial makeup of the city was 88.9% White, 0.0% Black or African American, 0.0% Native American, 0.3% Asian, 0.0% Pacific Islander, 6.4% from other races and 4.4% from two or more races. Hispanic or Latino persons of any race comprised 7.7% of the population.

Of the 157 households, 44.6% of which had children under the age of 18 living with them, 47.1% were married couples living together, 7.0% were cohabitating couples, 25.5% had a female householder with no spouse or partner present and 20.4% had a male householder with no spouse or partner present. 25.5% of all households were non-families. 21.7% of all households were made up of individuals, 10.8% had someone living alone who was 65 years old or older.

The median age in the city was 36.9 years. 32.1% of the residents were under the age of 20; 3.9% were between the ages of 20 and 24; 24.2% were from 25 and 44; 26.2% were from 45 and 64; and 13.6% were 65 years of age or older. The gender makeup of the city was 48.1% male and 51.9% female.

=== 2010 census ===
As of the census of 2010, there were 394 people, 156 households, and 105 families living in the city. The population density was 691.2 inhabitants per square mile (266.9/km^{2}). There were 174 housing units at an average density of 305.3 per square mile (117.9/km^{2}). The racial makeup of the city was 87.8% White, 0.8% African American, 2.0% Asian, and 9.4% from other races. Hispanic or Latino of any race were 11.7% of the population.

There were 156 households, of which 36.5% had children under the age of 18 living with them, 50.6% were married couples living together, 11.5% had a female householder with no husband present, 5.1% had a male householder with no wife present, and 32.7% were non-families. 31.4% of all households were made up of individuals, and 17.3% had someone living alone who was 65 years of age or older. The average household size was 2.53 and the average family size was 3.10.

The median age in the city was 33.3 years. 29.2% of residents were under the age of 18; 7.5% were between the ages of 18 and 24; 25.6% were from 25 to 44; 23.3% were from 45 to 64; and 14.2% were 65 years of age or older. The gender makeup of the city was 48.2% male and 51.8% female.

=== 2000 census ===
As of the census of 2000, there were 421 people, 163 households, and 113 families living in the city. The population density was 737.0 inhabitants per square mile (284.6/km^{2}). There were 174 housing units at an average density of 304.6 per square mile (117.6/km^{2}). The racial makeup of the city was 97.86% White, 0.24% African American, 0.48% Asian, and 1.43% from two or more races. Hispanic or Latino of any race were 2.38% of the population.

There were 163 households, out of which 38.7% had children under the age of 18 living with them, 55.2% were married couples living together, 12.3% had a female householder with no husband present, and 30.1% were non-families. 25.2% of all households were made up of individuals, and 13.5% had someone living alone who was 65 years of age or older. The average household size was 2.58 and the average family size was 3.14.

In the city, the population was spread out, with 29.9% under the age of 18, 9.7% from 18 to 24, 29.5% from 25 to 44, 16.6% from 45 to 64, and 14.3% who were 65 years of age or older. The median age was 34 years. For every 100 females, there were 87.9 males. For every 100 females age 18 and over, there were 87.9 males.

The median income for a household in the city was $37,500, and the median income for a family was $43,750. Males had a median income of $27,656 versus $17,857 for females. The per capita income for the city was $15,312. About 6.1% of families and 8.8% of the population were below the poverty line, including 12.6% of those under age 18 and 3.2% of those age 65 or over.

== Infrastructure ==
Charlotte is located on Iowa Highway 136 at the end of County Road Z24.

== Education ==
The Northeast Community School District operates public schools serving the community.
