= National Register of Historic Places listings in Clinton County, Iowa =

Location of Clinton County in Iowa

This is a list of the National Register of Historic Places listings in Clinton County, Iowa.

This is intended to be a complete list of the properties and districts on the National Register of Historic Places in Clinton County, Iowa, United States. Latitude and longitude coordinates are provided for many National Register properties and districts; these locations may be seen together in a map.

There are 32 properties and districts listed on the National Register in the county, including one National Historic Landmark.

This National Park Service list is complete through NPS recent listings posted October 23, 2026.

== Current listings ==
	Name on the Register	Image	Date listed	Location	City or town	Description
1	Ames Creek Bridge	Ames Creek Bridge	June 25, 1998 (#98000802)	300th St. over Ames Creek; 41°51′01″N 90°30′36″W	DeWitt	part of the Highway Bridges of Iowa Multiple Property Submission (MPS)
2	Ankeny Building	Ankeny Building	March 2, 2006 (#06000105)	201 5th Ave., S. 41°50′34″N 90°11′18″W	Clinton	part of the Clinton, Iowa MPS
3	Horace Anthony House	Horace Anthony House	May 1, 1991 (#91000533)	1206 Anthony Pl. 41°46′52″N 90°15′31″W	Camanche	
4	Castle Terrace Historic District	Castle Terrace Historic District	January 7, 1998 (#97001607)	Roughly along the junction of Terrace Dr. and Caroline Ave. 41°50′17″N 90°13′02″W	Clinton	part of the Clinton, Iowa MPS
5	Cherry Bank	Cherry Bank	November 22, 1999 (#99001382)	1458 Main Ave. 41°52′28″N 90°12′28″W	Clinton	
6	Chicago, Milwaukee, St. Paul & Pacific Depot- Delmar	Chicago, Milwaukee, St. Paul & Pacific Depot- Delmar	April 14, 1997 (#97000308)	West of Main St., between Railroad St. and Clinton Ave. 42°00′05″N 90°36′30″W	Delmar	part of the Advent & Development of Railroads in Iowa MPS
7	City Hotel	City Hotel	October 3, 2007 (#07001031)	214 S. Main St. 41°49′51″N 90°50′20″W	Wheatland	
8	Clinton County Courthouse	Clinton County Courthouse	July 2, 1981 (#81000230)	Between 6th and 7th Aves. 41°51′02″N 90°11′17″W	Clinton	part of the County Courthouses in Iowa Thematic Resource (TR)
9	Clinton High School and Public Library	Clinton High School and Public Library	September 19, 2012 (#12000792)	600 S. 4th St. 41°50′24″N 90°11′36″W	Clinton	part of the Clinton, Iowa MPS
10	Clinton Public Library	Clinton Public Library	May 23, 1983 (#83000349)	306 8th Ave, S. 41°50′17″N 90°11′29″W	Clinton	part of the Public Library Buildings in Iowa TR
11	George M. Curtis House	George M. Curtis House	October 1, 1979 (#79000892)	420 S. 5th Ave. 41°50′28″N 90°11′40″W	Clinton	
12	Delmar Calaboose	Delmar Calaboose	March 19, 1981 (#81000231)	Vane St. 42°00′02″N 90°36′21″W	Delmar	
13	Peter Dierks House	Peter Dierks House	December 30, 1998 (#98001543)	Iowa Highway 136, 5 miles (8.0 km) west of Clinton; 41°53′59″N 90°16′22″W	Clinton	
14	Dugan's Saloon	Dugan's Saloon	August 30, 2001 (#01000908)	516 Smith St. 41°49′26″N 90°38′53″W	Grand Mound	
15	Farmers and Merchants Savings Bank	Farmers and Merchants Savings Bank	August 30, 2001 (#01000909)	601 Smith St. 41°49′27″N 90°38′50″W	Grand Mound	
16	First National Bank	First National Bank	October 10, 1985 (#85003007)	226 5th Ave., S. 41°50′28″N 90°11′21″W	Clinton	
17	Grand Mound Town Hall and Waterworks Historic District	Grand Mound Town Hall and Waterworks Historic District	August 30, 2001 (#01000910)	613-615 Clinton St. 41°49′26″N 90°38′58″W	Grand Mound	
18	Henry and Elizabeth Guenther House		February 6, 2026 (#100012699)	201 W Lincolnway Street; 41°50′01″N 90°50′36″W	Wheatland	
19	Helvig-Olson Farm Historic District	Helvig-Olson Farm Historic District	August 15, 2000 (#00000924)	2008 260th St. 41°48′14″N 90°42′05″W	Grand Mound	part of the Norwegian Related Resources of Olive Township, Clinton County, Iowa MPS
20	Howes Building	Howes Building	December 15, 2004 (#04001351)	419-425 2nd St., S. 41°50′30″N 90°11′15″W	Clinton	
21	Iowa Mutual Insurance Company Home Office		August 7, 2024 (#100010667)	509 9th Street; 41°49′27″N 90°32′16″W	DeWitt	
22	George Johnson House	George Johnson House	August 15, 2000 (#00000923)	2566 190th Ave. 41°48′18″N 90°43′26″W	Calamus	part of the Norwegian Related Resources of Olive Township, Clinton County, Iowa MPS
23	Kvindherred Lutheran Church, School and Cemetery	Kvindherred Lutheran Church, School and Cemetery	August 15, 2000 (#00000922)	2589 190th Ave. 41°48′26″N 90°43′26″W	Calamus	part of the Norwegian Related Resources of Olive Township, Clinton County, Iowa MPS
24	Lafayette Lamb House	Lafayette Lamb House	October 18, 1979 (#79000893)	317 7th Ave., S. 41°50′19″N 90°11′30″W	Clinton	
25	Moeszinger-Marquis Hardware Co.	Moeszinger-Marquis Hardware Co.	February 9, 2006 (#06000004)	721 2nd St., S. 41°50′26″N 90°11′18″W	Clinton	part of the Clinton, Iowa MPS
26	Saint Boniface Church	Saint Boniface Church	February 24, 2012 (#97000386)	2500 N. Pershing Blvd. 41°52′27″N 90°10′50″W	Clinton	
27	Saint Irenaeus Church	Saint Irenaeus Church	September 3, 2010 (#96001589)	2811 N. 2nd St. 41°52′41″N 90°10′40″W	Clinton	
28	Sharon Methodist Episcopal Church	Sharon Methodist Episcopal Church	August 14, 2003 (#03000745)	1223 125th St. 41°59′43″N 90°51′18″W	Lost Nation	
29	Van Allen Store	Van Allen Store	January 7, 1976 (#76000753)	5th Ave. and S. 2nd St. 41°50′29″N 90°11′18″W	Clinton	
30	Washington Junior High School and Jefferson Grade School	Washington Junior High School and Jefferson Grade School	October 21, 2015 (#15000483)	751 2nd Ave. S. 41°50′40″N 90°12′12″W	Clinton	
31	Wilson Buildings	Wilson Buildings	February 5, 2014 (#13001135)	211–219 5th Ave. S 41°50′27″N 90°11′21″W	Clinton	
32	Wilson District No. 7 School	Wilson District No. 7 School	December 6, 2004 (#04001320)	1507 270th Ave. 41°57′32″N 90°34′05″W	Delmar	

== Former listings ==
	Name on the Register	Image	Date listed	Date removed	Location	City or town	Description
1	W. J. Young Company Machine Works	W. J. Young Company Machine Works	June 17, 1976 (#76000754)	Unknown	N of jct. of 10th Ave. and 1st St.	Clinton	

== See also ==
- List of National Historic Landmarks in Iowa
- National Register of Historic Places listings in Iowa
- Listings in neighboring counties: Carroll (IL), Cedar, Jackson, Jones, Rock Island (IL), Scott, Whiteside (IL)
