= City Hotel =

City Hotel may refer to:

- City Hotel (Sonora, California), listed on the National Register of Historic Places (NRHP) in Tuolumne County
- City Hotel (Wheatland, Iowa), NRHP-listed
- City Hotel (Marthaville, Louisiana), NRHP-listed
- Edison Hotel (Sunbury, Pennsylvania), known as the City Hotel until it was renamed in 1922
- City Hotel (Reedsburg, Wisconsin), NRHP-listed
- City Hotel (Manhattan) (1794–1849), a prominent establishment on Broadway
- City Hotel (New Orleans), antebellum hotel and slave market
