= Darden Hotel =

Darden Hotel or Hotel Darden may refer to:

- Darden Hotel (Hamilton, North Carolina), listed on the National Register of Historic Places
- City Hotel (Marthaville, Louisiana), also known as "Hotel Darden", listed on the National Register of Historic Places
