= Sharon Township, Clinton County, Iowa =

Township in Iowa, US

Sharon Township
- Township
- Location in Clinton County
- Coordinates: 41°59′19″N 090°50′54″W
- Country: United States
- State: Iowa
- County: Clinton

Area
  - Total: 36.28 sq mi (93.96 km^{2})
  - Land: 36.28 sq mi (93.96 km^{2})
  - Water: 0 sq mi (0 km^{2}) 0%
- Elevation: 764 ft (233 m)

Population (2000)
  - Total: 784
  - Density: 21/sq mi (8.3/km^{2})
- GNIS feature ID: 0468685

Sharon Township is a township in Clinton County, Iowa, United States. As of the 2000 census, its population was 784. Sharon Methodist Episcopal Church, which is located in the township, is listed on the National Register of Historic Places.

== Geography ==
Sharon Township covers an area of 36.28 square miles (94.0 km^{2}) and contains one incorporated settlement, Lost Nation. According to the USGS, it contains six cemeteries: Busch, Dickman, Lost Nation, Rustic Park, Sacred Heart and Smithtown.
