= De Witt Township, Clinton County, Iowa =

Township in Iowa, US

De Witt Township
- Township
- Location in Clinton County
- Coordinates: 41°49′25″N 090°31′33″W
- Country: United States
- State: Iowa
- County: Clinton

Area
  - Total: 54.5 sq mi (141.1 km^{2})
  - Land: 54.32 sq mi (140.69 km^{2})
  - Water: 0.16 sq mi (0.41 km^{2}) 0.29%
- Elevation: 690 ft (210 m)

Population (2000)
  - Total: 6,346
  - Density: 117/sq mi (45.1/km^{2})
- GNIS feature ID: 0467713

De Witt Township is a township in Clinton County, Iowa, United States. As of the 2000 census, its population was 6,346.

== History ==
De Witt Township was organized in 1843. It is named for DeWitt Clinton.

== Geography ==
De Witt Township covers an area of 54.48 square miles (141.1 km^{2}) and contains one incorporated settlement, De Witt. According to the USGS, it contains two cemeteries: Elmwood and Saint Joseph.

Crystal Lake is within this township. The streams of Ames Creek, Crystal Creek, Rock Creek and Silver Creek run through this township. The Ames Creek Bridge, which carries 300th St. over Ames Creek, is listed on the National Register of Historic Places.
