= Delwood Community School District =

School district in Delmar, Iowa, United States

Coordinates: 42.002635°N 90.605419°W

Location
- Delmar, Iowa Clinton County and Jackson County United States
- Coordinates: 42.002635, -90.605419

District information
- Type: Local school district
- Grades: PK-8
- Superintendent: Todd Hawley
- Schools: 1
- Budget: $3,542,000 (2015-16)
- NCES District ID: 1908880

Students and staff
- Students: 165 (2022-23)
- Teachers: 15.37 FTE
- Staff: 22.36 FTE
- Student–teacher ratio: 10.74
- District mascot: Vikings
- Colors: Green and Black

Other information
- Website: www.delwood.k12.ia.us

The Delwood Community School District is a rural public school district headquartered in Delmar, Iowa. The district is mostly in Clinton County, with a small area in Jackson County, and serves the town of Delmar and the surrounding rural areas.

Todd Hawley became superintendent of both Delwood and Midland Community School District in 2019.

== Schools ==
The district operates a single elementary school in Delmar:

- Delwood Elementary School

Students from Delwood attend secondary school at Maquoketa.
