= Wilson District No. 7 School =

- U.S. National Register of Historic Places
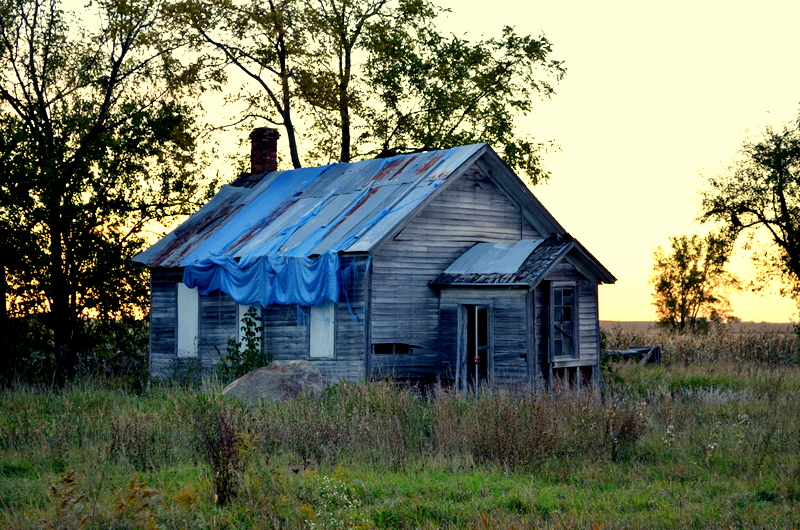

- Location within Iowa Location within the United States
- Location: 1507 270th Ave. Delmar, Iowa
- Coordinates: 41°57′32″N 90°34′05″W
- Area: less than one acre
- Built: 1880s
- Built by: Unknown
- Architectural style: Vernacular
- NRHP reference No.: 04001320
- Added to NRHP: December 6, 2004

Wilson District No. 7 School, also known as the O'Meara Schoolhouse, is an historic structure located in rural Clinton County, Iowa, United States near the town of Delmar. The one-room school was listed on the National Register of Historic Places in 2004. The listing includes three structures: the former school building and two outhouses.

== History ==
The first known school in Clinton County dates to around 1847 in the town of Lyons, which is now the north side of the city of Clinton. Bloomfield Township was established in 1855. The township's first school was a log structure built in 1859 in the town of Bloomfield, which became Delmar in 1871. The town established its own school district in 1874 and built its first school the following year. The township outside of Delmar was served by the Wilson District. It had nine country schools, and each was built to serve the educational needs of four sections of the township. Wilson #7 was built in the early 1880s on land owned by James and Ellen O'Meara, and is the only school building that remains of the original nine. It also has its original outhouses, eight of its original school desks, the original teachers' desk and chair, and some of the school books that date from the late 1800s. Electricity and an oil stove were installed in the building in the 1930s.

Consolidation of rural schools began during the administration of Theodore Roosevelt who established the National Commission on Country Life in 1908 to find solutions to rural problems, including education. The process of rural school consolidation continued into the 1960s. Wilson #7 closed in 1956 and ended its nearly 75 years of service as a school. The Wilson District itself merged with the Elwood and Delmar school districts in 1962. The building now sits in a dilapidated state, although there are plans to rehabilitate it.

== Architecture ==
The vernacular-style building is a 18-by-28-foot (5.5 by 8.5 m) frame structure with a vestibule. The side elevations feature three windows each. A brick chimney rises from the center of the west elevation. The school room itself has hardwood wooden floors and plaster walls. On both sides of the vestibule door are eight cupboards with metal latches. A raised platform of 10 inches (25 cm) on the west side extends about 9 feet (2.7 m) into the room. The oil-burning stove is still extant. The vestibule extends from the main facade on the east. Its interior also has wooden floors and plaster walls. A window is located on the east wall, and hooks with a shelf above them are located on the north wall. The door on the south wall opened unto a porch that is no longer extant.

The two outhouses, no longer extant, were built at the same time as the school building. The frame structures were located on the west side of the property, approximately 20 feet (6.1 m) from the school. The outhouse to the north was a three-hole privy, with one hole built for an adult. The one to the south was a two-hole privy built for children. The gender of the teacher determined which outhouse was used by which gender.
