= Delmar station (Chicago, Milwaukee, St. Paul and Pacific Railroad) =

Historic building in Delmar, Iowa, US

Delmar
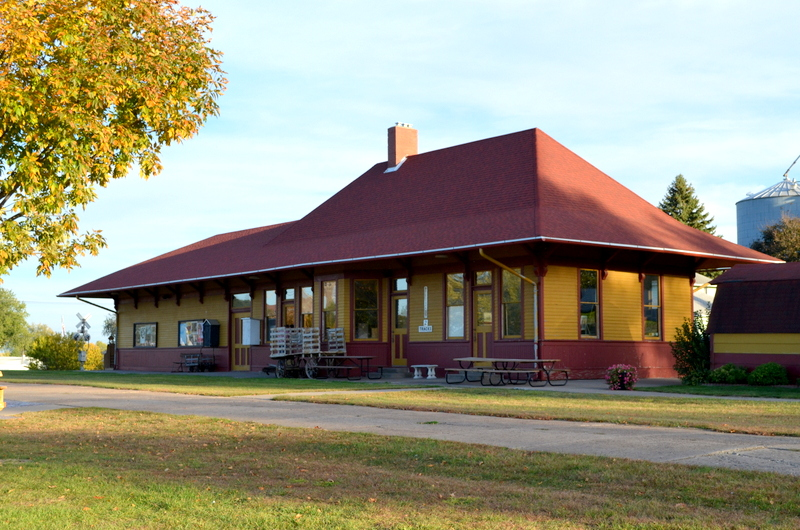
- Delmar station in September 2012.

General information
- Location: 100 Railroad Street, Delmar, Iowa 52037
- System: Former Milwaukee Road passenger rail station

History
- Rebuilt: 1905

Services
Preceding station	Milwaukee Road	Following station
Elwood toward Omaha	Omaha – Chicago	Browns toward Chicago
Maquoketa Terminus	Maquoketa – Davenport	Welton toward Davenport
- Chicago, Milwaukee, St. Paul and Pacific Depot - Delmar
- U.S. National Register of Historic Places
- Location within Iowa
- Location: Main Street, between Railroad St and Clinton Ave., Delmar, Iowa
- Coordinates: 42°00′03″N 90°36′29″W
- Area: less than one acre
- Built: 1905
- MPS: Advent & Development of Railroads in Iowa MPS
- NRHP reference No.: 97000308
- Added to NRHP: March 14, 1997
Location

Delmar station is a former railroad station located in Delmar, Iowa, United States. It is listed on the National Register of Historic Places.

== History ==
The original station was built in Delmar in the 1870s and the present structure was built for the Chicago, Milwaukee, St. Paul & Pacific Railroad (Milwaukee Road) in 1905. The depot is a rectangular, single story, wood-frame building built of a standard design for rural stations. There were waiting rooms (one for men and the other for women) at one end of the depot and a freight room at the other end. While this was not unusual in the Eastern United States, it was a unique design for the Midwest. In between the waiting rooms and the freight room was the station agent's office.

Delmar owes its existence to railroads. Three railroads converged there in the late 1870s and it was named Delmar Junction. Eventually, only the Milwaukee Road remained and was a strong influence on the development of the town. The depot was located on the Milwaukee Road's mainline from Chicago to Omaha.

The depot remained in use until 1977. After that, it remained vacant until it was purchased by the City of Delmar. The last freight train used the station in 1982. Restoration of the building began in 1995, and it was listed on the National Register of Historic Places in 1997. It now houses the Delmar Depot Museum, which contains a collection of over 1,500 historical items. The site also includes an old caboose named "Elizabeth" and a mural on the old viaduct wall that commemorates the Orphan Train.
