= Peter Dierks House =

Historic house in Iowa, United States

- U.S. National Register of Historic Places
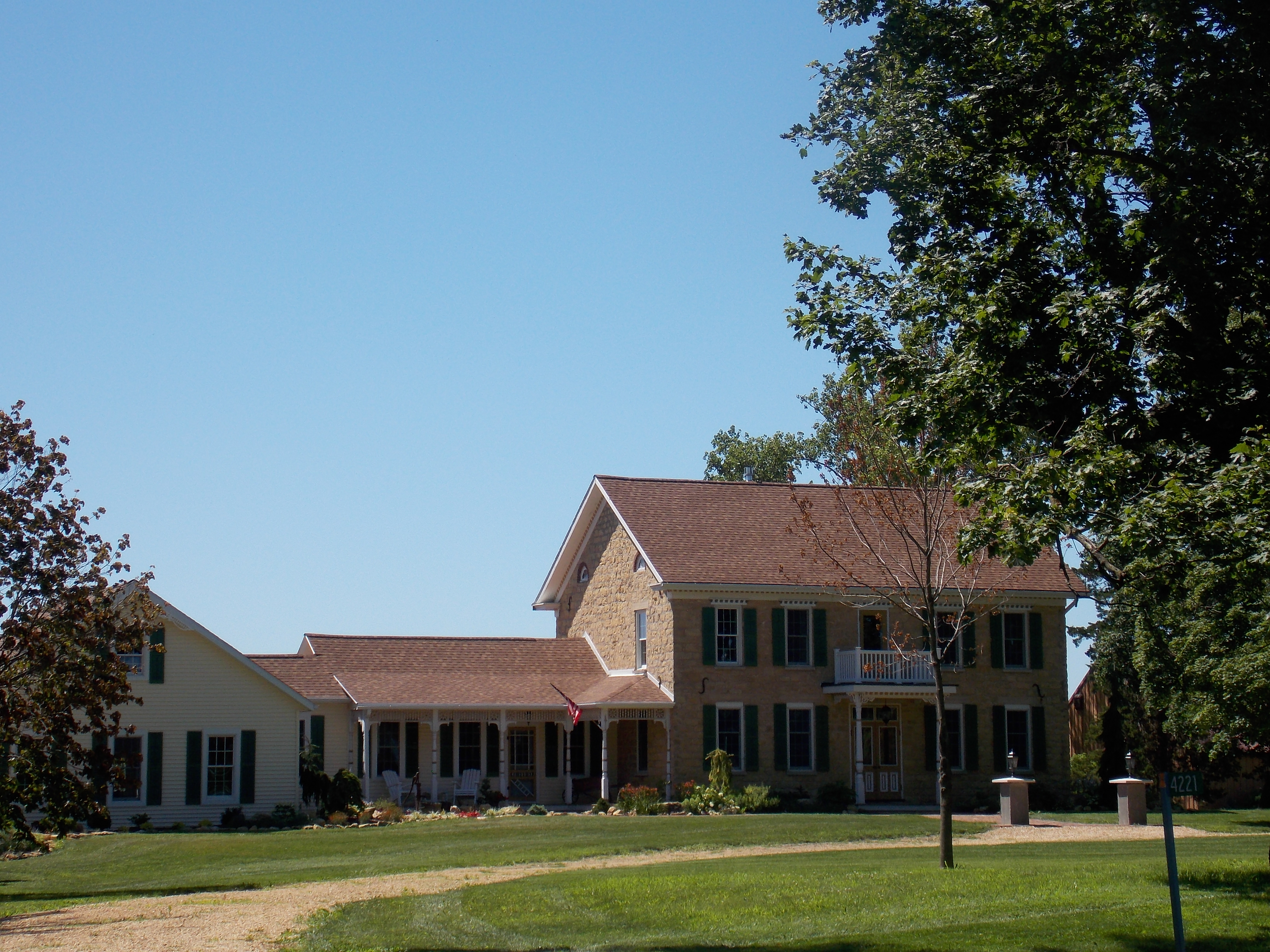

- Location within Iowa Location within the United States
- Location: Iowa Highway 136, 5 miles (8.0 km) west of Clinton, Iowa
- Coordinates: 41°53′59.24″N 90°16′22.16″W
- Area: 5 acres (2.0 ha)
- Built: 1865
- Built by: Peter Dierks, Sr.
- NRHP reference No.: 98001543
- Added to NRHP: December 30, 1998

The Peter Dierks House, also known as the Preston Creveling House, is an historic residence located in rural Clinton County, Iowa, United States. It was listed on the National Register of Historic Places in 1998.

== History ==
Peter Dierks, Sr. immigrated from Schleswig-Holstein (Germany) to the United States in 1848. He made the ocean voyage with other members of his family and landed in New York City. He went to stay with his brother John in Lyons, Iowa, now the north side of the city of Clinton. He rented a farm until he could afford to buy 800 acres (320 ha) of his own land. He lived in a frame dwelling until he built this house in 1865 where he raised his family. He was engaged in general farming until he cleared more land and started a livestock operation. Dierks' became prosperous as he sold off some of his property to other settlers. He died in 1897 and his son, Peter Dierks, Jr., took over the farm and raised his ten children in the house. He added the wood-frame kitchen, with a Queen Anne style porch and pantry wing in 1899. Peter Jr. lost the house during the Great Depression in 1931 to Preston Creveling and his family. A bathroom was added into the house only in 1970. The Creveling family owned the house for almost 60 years when they sold it to Leif and Barbara Solheim in 1990. They sold it to Arlene Rose Considine in March 1996.

== Architecture ==
The Dierks-Creveling House is a two-story dwelling of native yellow limestone that was built on a 21-inch (53 cm) stone foundation. The main house measures 27 by 36 feet (8.2 by 11.0 m). The stone walls taper to 18 inches (46 cm) on the second floor. The frame kitchen measures 17 by 26 feet (5.2 by 7.9 m), and the room off the kitchen is 17 by 21 feet (5.2 by 6.4 m). The entrance porch on the addition features five turned posts and two one/half posts as its supports. Between the posts are Queen Anne-style turnings located under the roof line. A two-story porch with square columns, corbels and turned spindles extended the length of the main house. Its possible it was added at the same time as the porch on the addition as the turnings appear to be similar. However, the exact date of its construction is unknown and it has subsequently been removed.
