= St. Boniface Church (Clinton, Iowa) =

- Saint Boniface Church
- U.S. National Register of Historic Places
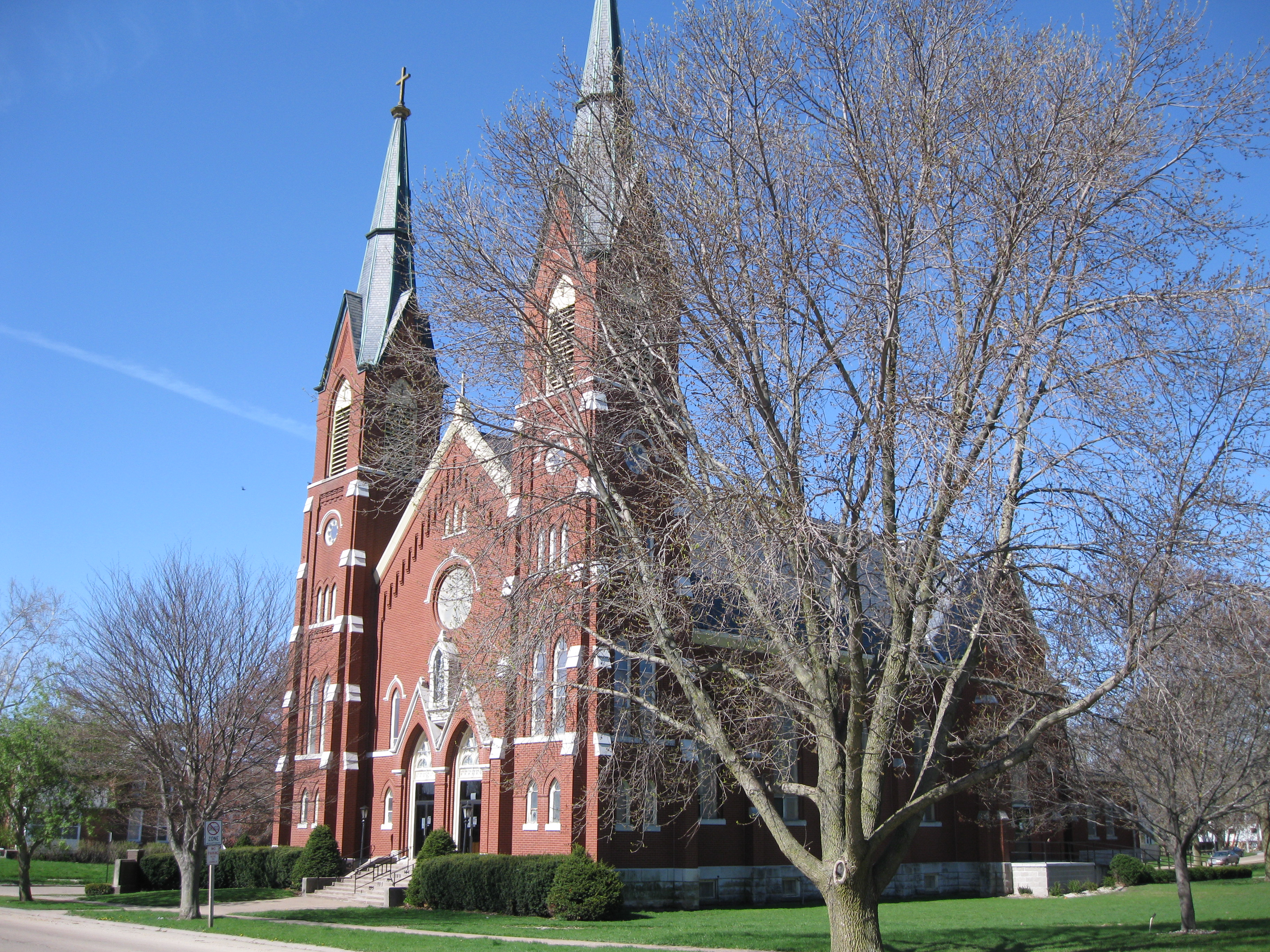

- Location within Iowa Location within the United States
- Location: 2500 N. Pershing Blvd. Clinton, Iowa
- Coordinates: 41°52′27″N 90°10′50″W
- Built: 1908
- Built by: Anton Zwack
- Architect: Martin Heer
- Architectural style: Gothic Revival
- NRHP reference No.: 97000386
- Added to NRHP: February 24, 2012

St. Boniface Church is a former parish church of the Diocese of Davenport. The church was founded in the town of Lyons, which is now the north side of Clinton, Iowa, United States. The church building is now a museum named The Catholic Historical Center at St. Boniface, with exhibits about the history of the Clinton area Catholic community, and an archive of local Catholic church artifacts and records. The church was listed on the National Register of Historic Places in 2012.

== History ==
Bishop Mathias Loras of the Diocese of Dubuque said the first Mass in Lyons. The Mass was celebrated in a log home in 1848. The area was visited by various priests, including the Rev. J.A.M. Pelamourges from Davenport, and the Rev. Frederic Cyrille Jean, who was assigned as the first resident pastor at the first parish in town, St. Irenaeus Church.

In October 1861 the German Catholics in Lyons from St. Irenaeus founded St. Boniface Parish. They acquired a former Presbyterian church as their first building. Their first pastor was Father Aloysius Meis. Three years later the parish established the first parochial school in Clinton County. In 1871 the Sisters of Charity of the Blessed Virgin Mary came to the parish to teach in the school. In time they were replaced by the Sisters of St. Francis from Clinton. The rectory, which is next to the present church, was built in 1873. Sacred Heart Church in Clinton was established as a mission of St. Boniface in 1891. The priests from St. Boniface took care of that parish until 1903 when a resident pastor was assigned to Sacred Heart. Father Tritz became pastor at St. Boniface in 1901. He helped to design the present church, which was completed in 1908. Three years later all five Clinton parishes joined the Davenport Diocese when Clinton County was transferred to the Diocese of Davenport.

The parish school was merged with the school at St. Irenaeus in the 1970s to form North Catholic School. Eventually, all the Catholic grade schools in Clinton merged to form Holy Trinity School. The parish itself was officially closed in 1990 when the five parishes in Clinton were merged to form Jesus Christ, Prince of Peace Parish. The new parish continued to use the old churches until a new church could be built. St. Boniface was closed in 2007. A new church was built for the parish on the west side of town in 2009. A non-profit group has turned the church building into a religious heritage museum.

== Architecture ==
The Gothic Revival style structure was meant to reflect the German heritage of the congregation. It was designed by Dubuque architect Martin Heer. The cornerstone was laid on June 5, 1908, and it was dedicated on November 27, 1908. The structure was built by Anton Zwack of Dubuque. Two bell towers topped with spires dominate the main facade of the church. A statue of St. Boniface is in a niche above the main entrances. The exterior is composed of pressed red brick with blue Bedford stone trim. The interior features three naves. The high altar in the apse features another statue of St. Boniface in the main niche. It is decorated with light bulbs, which reflect Father Tritz's fascination with electricity. The altar was built by B. Ferring of Chicago and installed in September 1910. The stained glass windows were produced by Munic Studio of Chicago.
