= Dugan's Saloon =

- U.S. National Register of Historic Places
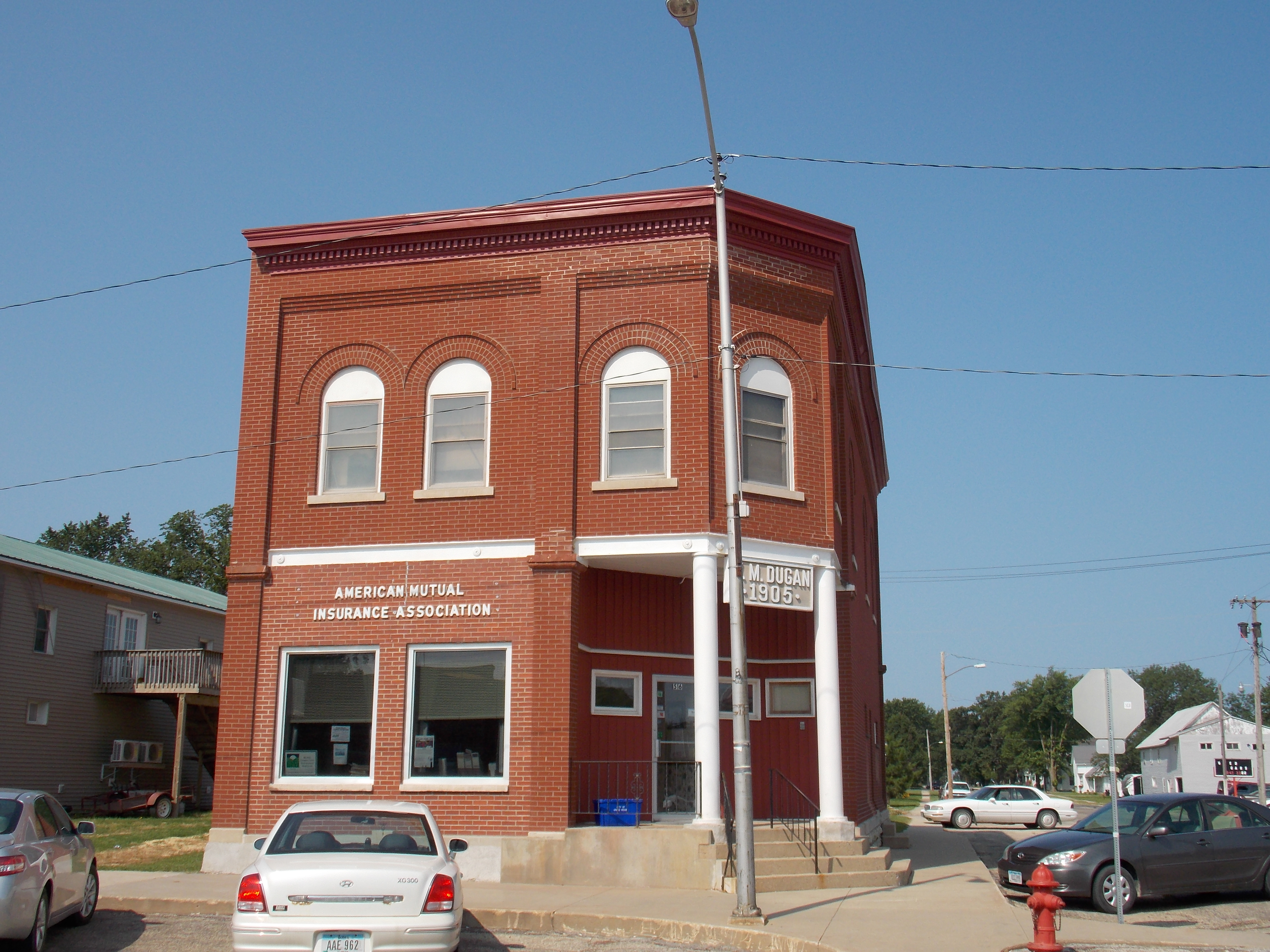

- Location within Iowa Location within the United States
- Location: 516 Smith St. Grand Mound, Iowa
- Coordinates: 41°49′26.29″N 90°38′52.72″W
- Area: less than one acre
- Built: 1905
- Architectural style: Romanesque Revival
- NRHP reference No.: 01000908
- Added to NRHP: August 30, 2001

Dugan's Saloon is an historic building located in Grand Mound, Iowa, United States. The building has subsequently housed other businesses and is no longer a saloon. It was listed on the National Register of Historic Places in 2001.

== History ==
William Dugan, who had this building constructed, was born in Ireland in 1868. He immigrated with his parents to the United States five years later. He married Ellen Hughes, whose family were also of Irish ancestry. This building was either his second or third saloon in Grand Mound. It is known he had built another two-story brick building in 1895. The second floor of that building housed a dance hall with a saloon on the first floor. Dance hall saloons were generally seen as places that lacked social integrity as they generally employed women of questionable virtue to entertain the men who patronized them. There is, however, no record of what kind of establishment Dugan's other saloon was. There may have been another business before that one as well.

The property on which Dugan built his saloon in 1905 had previously been the Kahler General Store. The store was destroyed in a fire, and he bought the property from the Kahler family in 1902. The second floor of the 1905 building has residential space that was occupied by Dugan, his wife and daughter. He continued to own the 1895 building and he rented it to grocer Herman Lucht. Grand Mound was mostly a German community with some Irish residents as well. After the American Civil War temperance organizations gained in popularity in Clinton County, including among the Germans. In 1908 there were 92 licensed saloons in Clinton County, with 66 located in the City of Clinton alone. Societal attitudes toward the consumption of alcohol were changing. An advertisement that year in the Clinton County Farmers' Institute describes Dugan's establishment as a "dealer in wines, liquors, and cigars." It suggests that the saloon had become a wine room. By 1910, however, the Farmers' Institute does not mention Dugan's establishment. Farmers and Merchants Savings Bank became the tenant in the building in 1912, while the Dugan family continued to live in the second floor apartment. Dugan's obituary credited him as a principal organizer of the new bank. Dugan sold all of his real estate holdings in Grand Mound to Julius Detlef, a local hardware merchant, in 1919. By that time he resided in Winnebago County, Illinois where he was a soft drink manufacturer in Rockford. The family left Rockford sometime around 1921. He died in October 1943 at a farm he owned near Davis Junction, Illinois. His daughter Theresa, who had married Frank Danielson, also resided in Davis Junction.

After Farmers and Merchants Bank relocated to its new building in 1923 the building was rented to William DeLange, who opened a pharmacy. He and his wife and son lived in the apartment above. After DeLange moved his business to another building in 1935, the building housed a variety of taverns with different owners. The names included The Old Timer, Heavilin's Tavern, and 6 By Tavern. The main floor was partitioned in 1954 and the post office moved into the front part of the building. Not long after that the American Mutual Insurance Association bought the building and occupied the space in the rear of the building. The post office moved out in 1965 and American Mutual took over the entire first floor. The upstairs apartment became a storage area.

== Architecture ==
Dugan's Saloon is a two-story, red brick structure that was built on a rough-cut stone foundation that sits about 2 feet (61 cm) above grade. It features a recessed entrance on the corner and a cut-corner on the second floor that reflect its location on a corner lot. The Smith Street elevation is segmented, especially on the second floor, when compared to the Clinton Street elevation. The round arch windows facing Smith Street on the second floor are in recessed areas that are framed by pilasters. The wide cornice across the top features brick corbel tables. At one time a parapet with a date block was located at the top of the cut-corner. It has been removed and the date block relocated to the logia and is flanked by two columns of the Tuscan order. The building is capped with a flat roof that gently slopes from the front to the rear of the structure. The entry area has changed over the years. It originally had large windows and that space was altered in the 1950s for the post office, and then at least once more after that. Dugan's Saloon is somewhat unusual in Grand Mound's commercial district in that it "broke away from the Victorian vernacular to employ, however weakly, a recognizable architectural style."
