= Wilson Building (Clinton, Iowa) =

- Wilson Buildings
- U.S. National Register of Historic Places
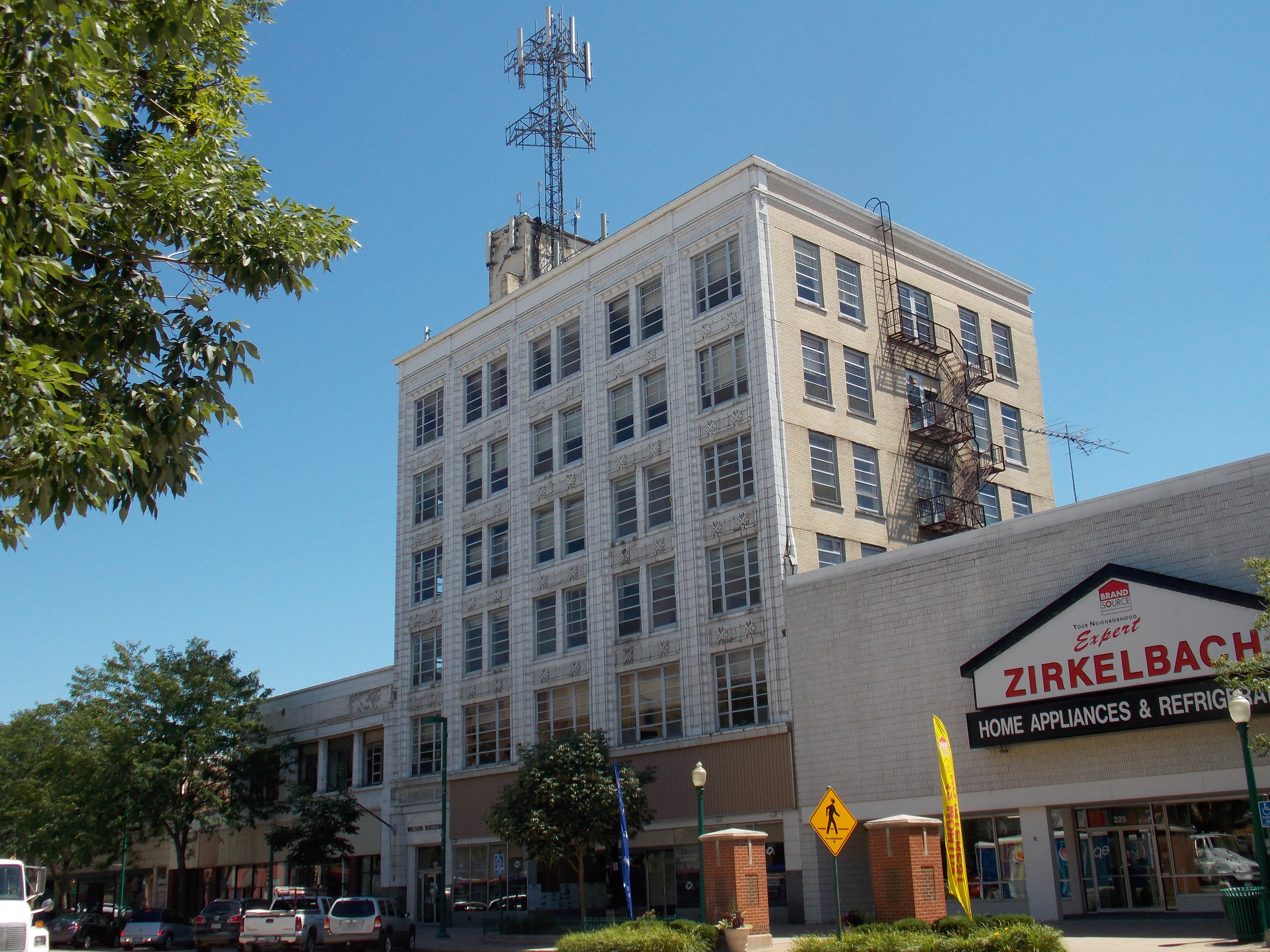

- Location within Iowa Location within the United States
- Location: 211–219 5th Ave. S. Clinton, Iowa
- Coordinates: 41°50′27″N 90°11′21″W
- Built: 1912-1914
- Architect: John Morrell & Son
- Architectural style: Chicago School
- NRHP reference No.: 13001135
- Added to NRHP: February 5, 2014

The Wilson Building, also known as the Wilson Buildings, is a historic structure located in downtown Clinton, Iowa, United States. It was listed on the National Register of Historic Places in 2014.

== History ==
The Clinton architectural firm of John Morrell & Son designed the building in the Chicago School style. Daniel Haring was the contractor who built it from 1912 to 1914. Three other phases expanded the building's size over the years. At one time the building housed a J. C. Penney store and a Walgreens. They both pulled out of the building and downtown Clinton in the late 1990s. The upper floors of the building housed professional offices. The building was already deteriorating when the Jacobsen Group bought it in 1998, and they stabilized the structure. Rock Island, Illinois-based Rock Island Economic Growth Corp started converting the building into 33 apartments in 2021. The $13.88 million project is expected to be completed in Mid-2022. Concurrently with the building renovation it continues to house commercial businesses.

== Architecture ==
At six stories and 73.18 feet (22 m), the Wilson Building is the tallest building in Clinton. The exterior is covered with white terra cotta. The building has a lively façade that is richly textured and ornamented. At the same time its lines retain their definition and appropriateness.
