= Sharon Methodist Episcopal Church =

- U.S. National Register of Historic Places
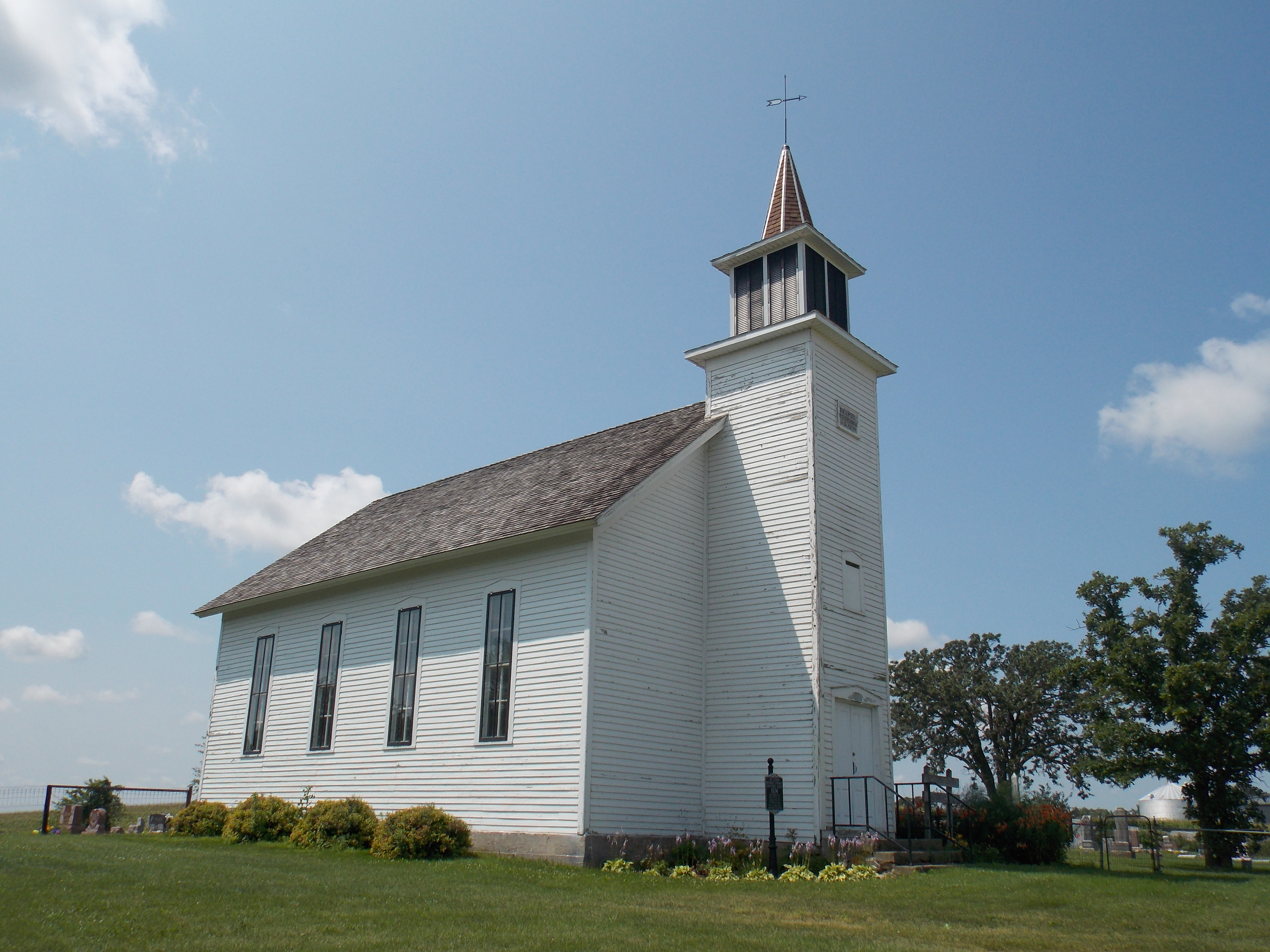
- Smithtown Church in 2014

- Location within Iowa Location within the United States
- Location: 1223 125th St., north of Lost Nation, Iowa
- Coordinates: 41°59′43″N 90°51′18″W
- Built: 1874
- Architectural style: Italianate
- NRHP reference No.: 03000745
- Added to NRHP: August 14, 2003

Sharon Methodist Episcopal Church is located near the city of Lost Nation in Sharon Township, a rural area of northwest Clinton County, Iowa, United States. The building is the only remaining structure that remains of a community by the name of Burgess, which was nicknamed Smithtown. Although the church is named after the township, the building is commonly referred to as the Smithtown Church. It was listed on the National Register of Historic Places in 2003.

== History ==
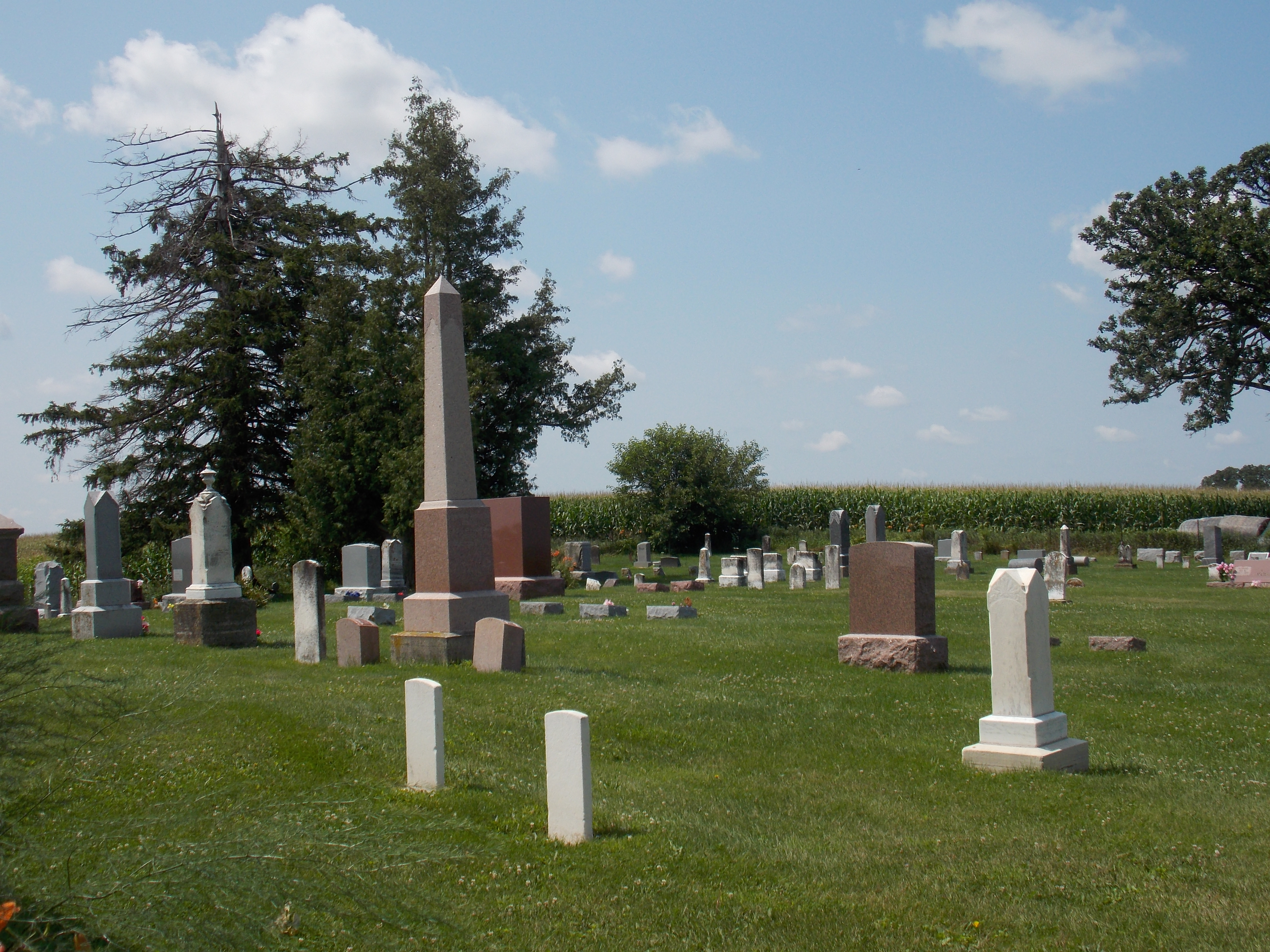
The cemetery in the churchyard.

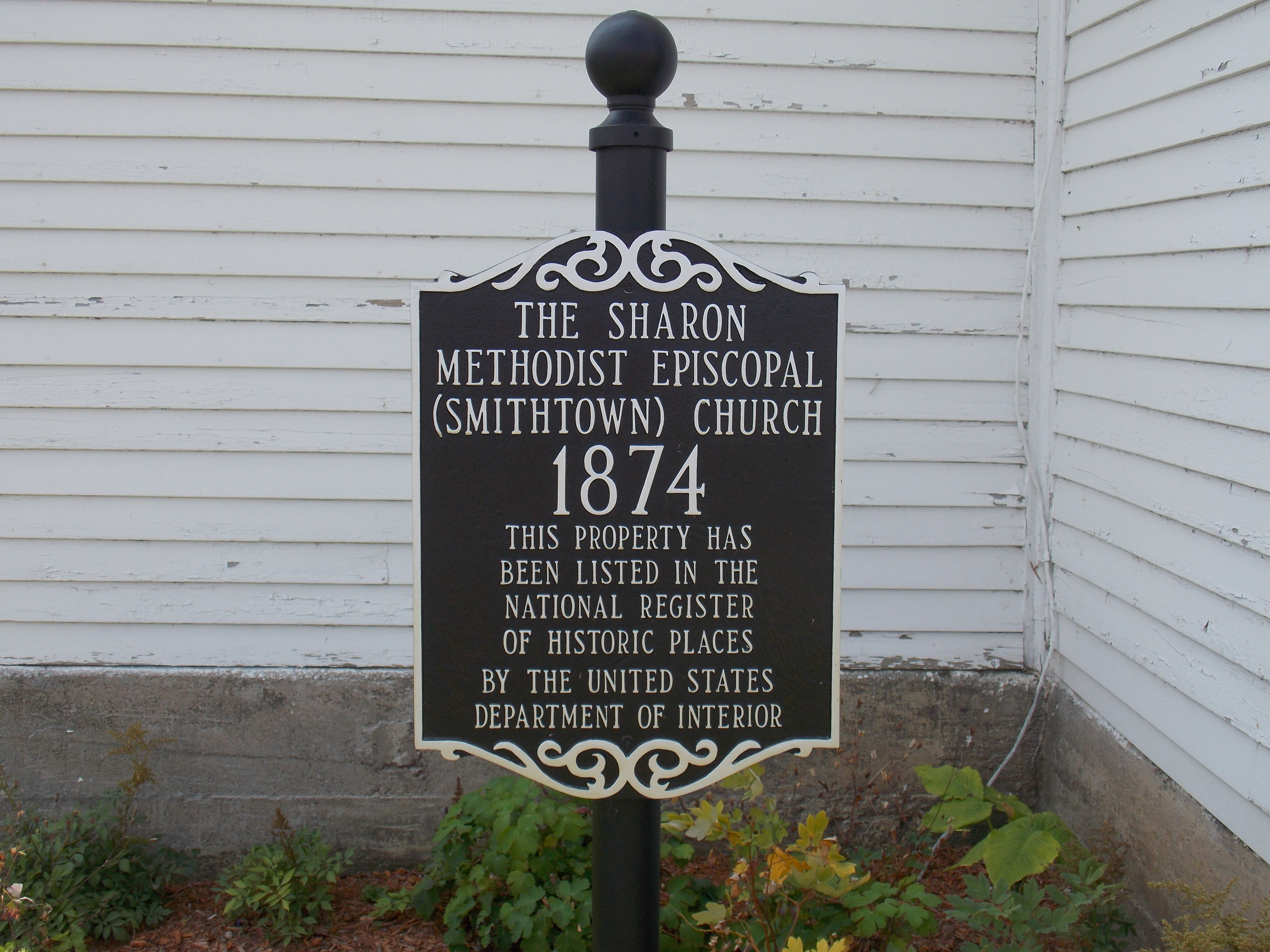
Historical marker

The Sharon Methodist Church was incorporated in 1865 in the town of Burgess, which was a crossroads community along the Camanche to Anamosa territorial road in northwest Clinton County. Land for a church and cemetery was donated by George Reed, a trustee and local landowner. Burials began in the cemetery soon after, while the church was not built until 1874. The financial depression of the early 1870s made money scarce. In 1875 St. John's Congregation of the German Reformed Church of Sharon Township paid one-fourth of what it cost to build the church to use the building for their services. They, therefore, had use of the church building one-fourth of the time. The Methodist congregation belonged to the Monmouth Circuit of the Upper Iowa Conference of the Methodist Church and was served by ministers from Monmouth, Iowa. The Reformed congregation was affiliated with St. Paul's Reformed Church in Wheatland and was served by ministers from that church. The two congregations shared the church building throughout their histories.

In 1871 the Sabula, Ackley and Dakota Railroad announced plans to pass through Sharon Township. However, the tracks were to be built two miles south of Burgess. A station was built at Lost Nation and many of the village's business, including the general store, moved there to be near the railroad. The Good Templar Sharon Valley Lodge, a benevolent and charitable organization that promoted temperance, remained active at Smithtown until 1900. It was the two congregations shared commitment to temperance that may have made the Methodists willing to work with the Germans, who were not always accepted. Smithtown Church discontinued regular services in the late 1920s. Thereafter, it was used for special occasions such as funerals and community meetings. The Smithtown Cemetery Association was established in 1929 to care for the cemetery and the church. In 1931 they purchased the property from the Upper Iowa Conference. The cemetery association presented the property to the Clinton County Conservation Board for use as a historical site on August 2, 1970.

== Architecture ==
The building is of wood construction in the Italianate style. It features a central bell tower on the main façade, where the entrance into the church is located. The tower is topped with a belfry and a short spire. The side walls of the church contain four rectangular windows with shutters.
