= Helvig–Olson Farm Historic District =

Historic district in Iowa, United States

- U.S. National Register of Historic Places
- U.S. Historic district
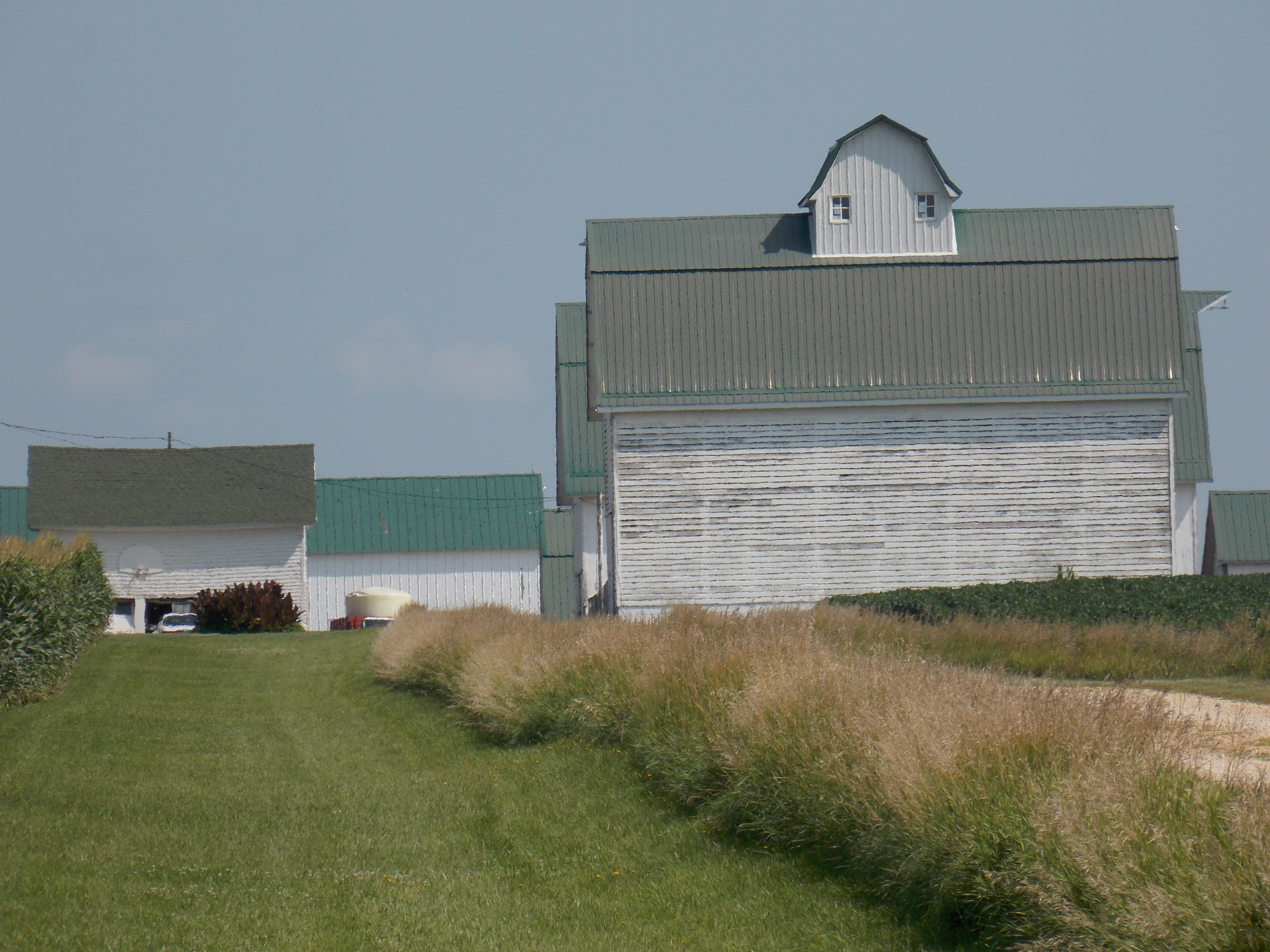
- The original house, now a garage is on the left and the corn crib is on the right. The other farm buildings are behind them (July 2014).

- Location within Iowa Location within the United States
- Location: 2008 260th St. Grand Mound, Iowa
- Coordinates: 41°48′14″N 90°42′05″W
- Area: 4.3 acres (1.7 ha)
- Built by: Will Ehlers, L. P. Huetter
- MPS: Norwegian Related Resources of Olive Township, Clinton County, Iowa MPS
- NRHP reference No.: 00000924
- Added to NRHP: August 15, 2000

The Helvig–Olson Farm Historic District is an agricultural historic district located in rural Clinton County, Iowa, United States, 3 miles (4.8 km) southwest of the town of Grand Mound. It was listed on the National Register of Historic Places in 2000.

== History ==
The Helvig–Olson family originally immigrated from Kvinnherad Parish in Norway to Kendall County, Illinois. They then moved to Olive Township, Clinton County, Iowa in the late 1850s and early 1860s. John J. Helvig bought the original 80 acres (32 ha) of this farm in 1864. His half-brother John Olson, one of the founding members of the Kvindherred Lutheran Church located 1 mile (1.6 km) west of the farmstead, had bought a nearby farm two years prior.

The surnames of first generation Norwegian immigrants was somewhat inconsistent. It was the custom in rural Norway to give a child three names when they were born: a Christian (first) name, a patronymic surname that included the father's first name, and a third name that was the farm on which the family lived whether they owned it or not. The surname was gender-specific. For example, Oleson was used for a boy and Olesdatter for a girl. After they arrived in America, Norwegians were encouraged to choose either their patronymic surname or their place name as their American surname, but not both. The female version of the patronymic name, -datter, was replaced by -son or -sen for single women. It could be confusing as the first generation used the names interchangeably. John Olson, the half-brother of John Helvig, was also referred to as John O. Helvig. "Olson" was their Americanized patronymic surname and "Helvig" was the farm on which they were both born.

The Helvig–Olson family prospered here. Helvig had increased the size of the farm to 380 acres (150 ha) by 1864. Starting in 1870 John Olson wrote letters to his brother in Norway stating, "Your children can now earn their own living by feeding and clothing themselves over here and also be of help to you parents." Nils Olai Olson, John Olson's only son, bought the Helvig farm in 1901. He consolidated the two farms under his ownership and it made him one of the largest landowners in Olive Township. The farm, reduced to 237 acres (96 ha), was eventually acquired by Joel Olson, a great-grand-nephew of John J. Helvig. He owned it at the time the farm was listed on the National Register.

== Description ==
The historic district is limited to 4.3 acres (1.7 ha) of the original farm. On it are eight buildings, six of which were built between 1928 and 1943. On the north side of the farmstead is a large machine shed, clad in steel, that was built in 1978. It is the only non-contributing structure on the farmstead.

The land of the farmstead itself is a contributing property. On the west side and a small section of the north side is a windbreak of shade trees in the yard. The oldest trees were planted in 1910 and more were added in 1960. A long lane connects the farmstead with 260th Street.

The farm land is relatively flat and at one time had marshes on it that have been, for the most part, drained. There is a spring located on the original farm, to the northeast of the farmstead. It is the source for Barber Creek, which is a tributary of the Wapsipinicon River to the south. It was also a water source for several farms in the area before wells were drilled for that purpose. The first settlers did their laundry at the site. In 1912, drainage tiles and ditches were installed on the farm. Trees have subsequently grown up in the area of the spring and two ponds were created to the south in 1933 and 1937.

== Buildings ==
The original house dates from the 1860s and was converted into a garage in 1940. It was built as a Norwegian-American Akerhusisk plan house. The two-story frame structure has been altered on the main level to create two large openings on the south side. The second floor remains intact. The original secondary entrance and several of the house's original windows also remain in use. The structure was moved to its current location when a new house was built.

The current house was built in 1930 on the location of the original house. It is a basic American Four-Square structure with Craftsman influences on the front porch. It is capped with a Prairie-style low pitch roof with low profile dormers on the south and west sides, and wide eaves. The two-story square structure is clad in wood lap siding. The house is built on a limestone foundation that is faced with brick on the exterior. In addition to the front porch there is also a side porch, a rear service entrance, and a small projecting window bay off the dining room. The house was built by Will Ehlers, who was also responsible for similar houses in the area.

The farm building were built along the east side of the farmstead. They were all painted red with white trim until around 1940 when they were all painted white.

The oldest farm building is the hog house built in 1928. The 28-by-48-foot (8.5 by 14.6 m) structure includes a holding pen, pasture, and exercise area. The building features a gambrel roof with two rows of eight skylights on both sides, two ventilators on the roof peak and a large sliding door on the west side.

The barn is 74 feet (23 m) south of the hog house. The 38-by-60-foot (12 by 18 m) structure was built by Will Ehlers in 1937. It also has a gambrel roof with two dormers on the south side and a ventilator at the roof peak. The frame structure is built on a concrete foundation, the exterior walls are covered with vertical tongue-and-groove fir. The interior's ground level has a central passage. The horse stalls and calf pen were located on the north side and dairy cow stalls were the south. The upper level originally had two 10-by-18-foot (3.0 by 5.5 m) grain bins on one end, but it was later converted into a single loft that was used for hay storage. Like the hog building, it also has its own has holding pen, pasture, and exercise area.

To the south and east of the barn is a cattle "loafing" shed. The 24-by-60-foot (7.3 by 18.3 m) structure was built in 1943 of wood-frame construction. It features an off-center gable roof and a sliding door on the west side, and has four open bays that face south on the interior. Hi The final major farm building is a double corn crib, built in 1941. It was constructed by L. P. Huetter, a contractor from Calamus, Iowa. The 30-by-50-foot (9.1 by 15.2 m) structure is of wood construction. It is composed of a 5,000-bushel grain bin between two 4,000-bushel cribs. It is capped with a gambrel roof and a gambrel roof cupola that houses elevator machinery that lifts ear corn and grain and directs them into the cribs. The floor of the building is composed of concrete and the walls are beveled pine boards, or cribbing, that are spaced to allow for ventilation.
