= Farmers and Merchants Savings Bank (Grand Mound, Iowa) =

- U.S. National Register of Historic Places
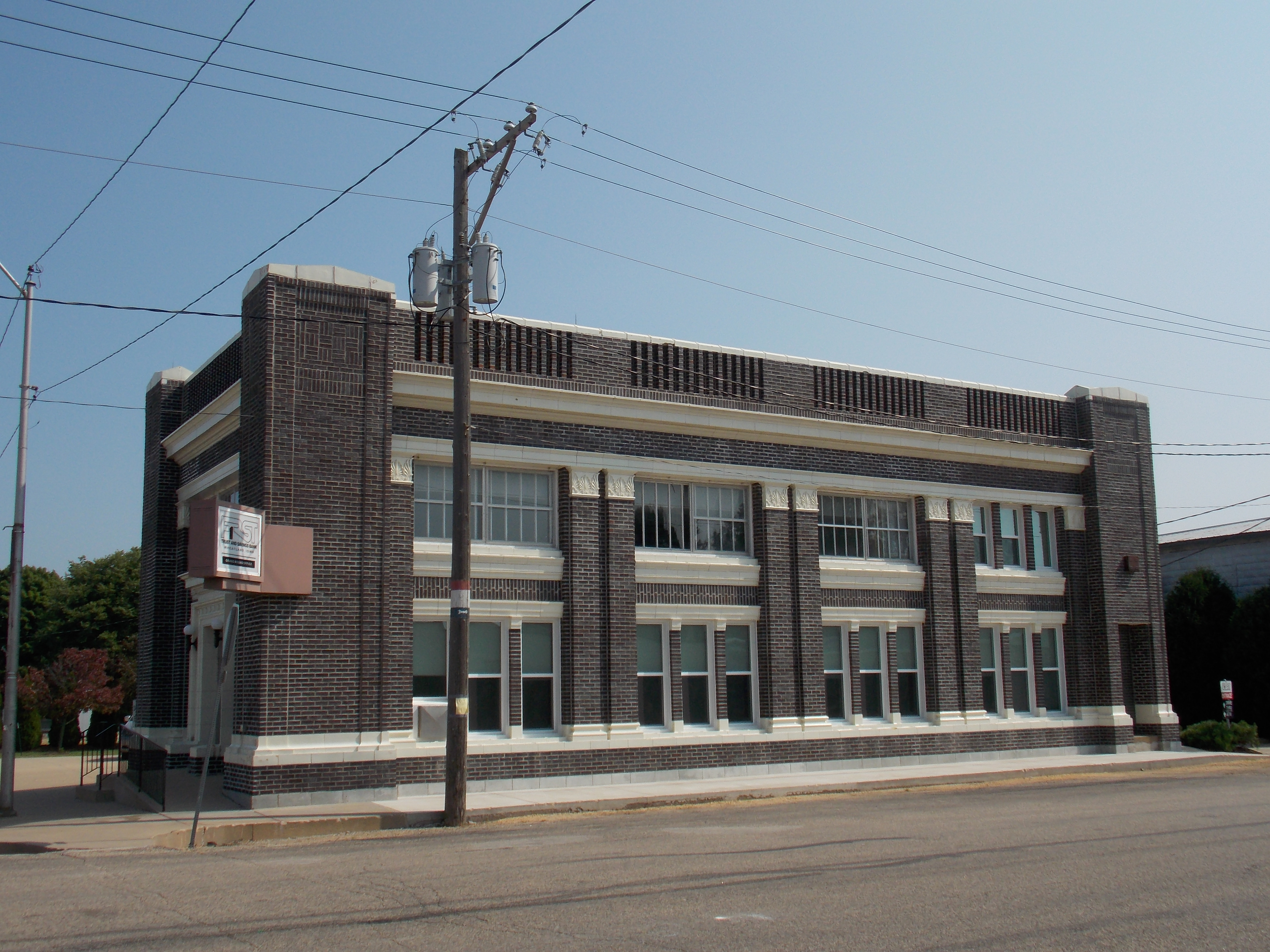

- Location within Iowa Location within the United States
- Location: 601 Smith St. Grand Mound, Iowa
- Coordinates: 41°49′27.37″N 90°38′50.72″W
- Area: less than one acre
- Built: 1923
- Architect: Lytle Company
- Architectural style: Late 19th century and Early 20th century revivals
- NRHP reference No.: 01000909
- Added to NRHP: August 30, 2001

Farmers and Merchants Savings Bank, also known as Union Savings Bank and First Trust and Savings Bank, is an historic building located in Grand Mound, Iowa, United States. It was listed on the National Register of Historic Places in 2001.

== History ==
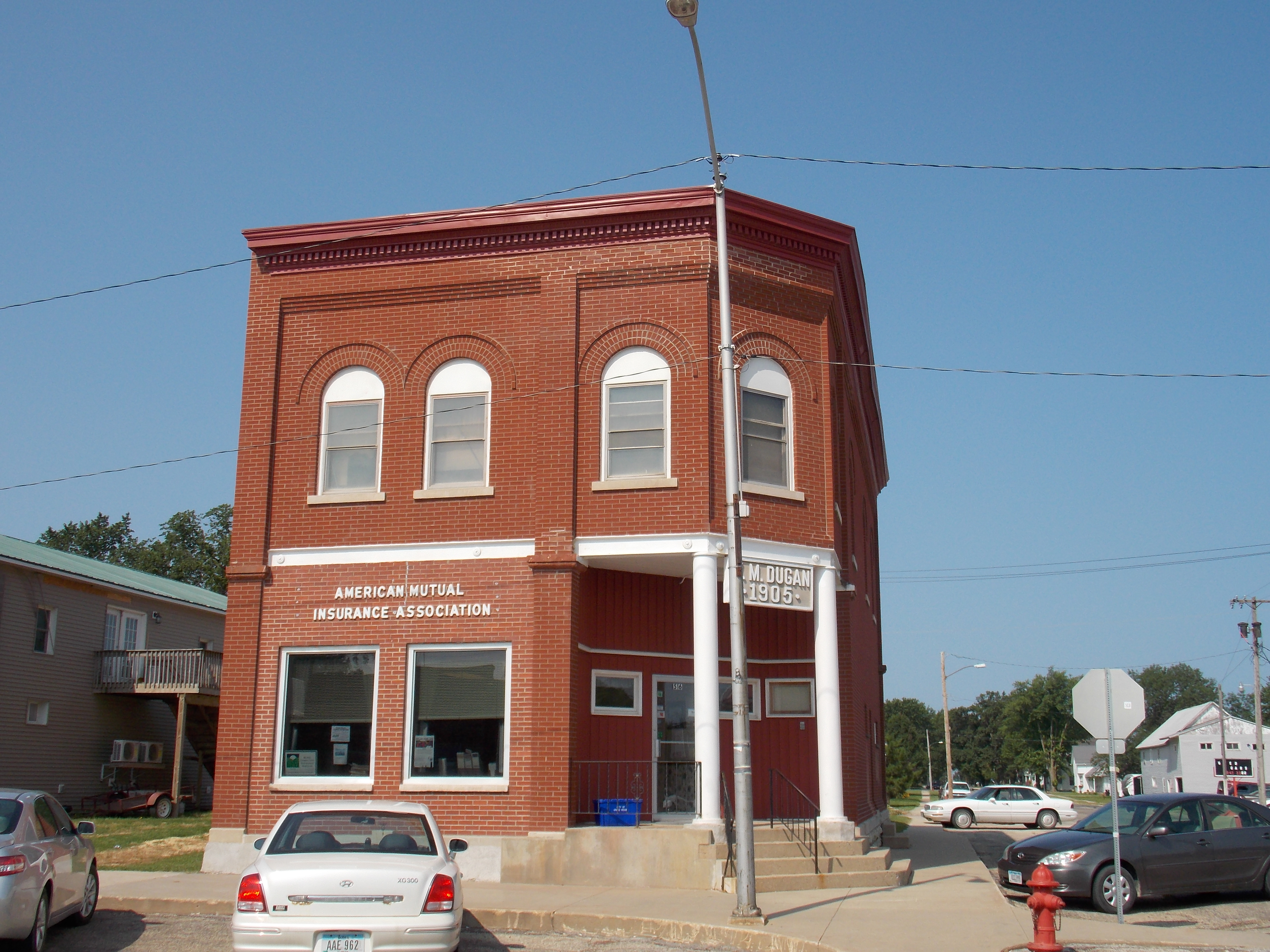
Dugan's Saloon

Farmers and Merchants Savings Bank was founded in 1912. It was originally located in the Dugan's Saloon building which is diagonally across the street from the present building. The land on which the bank now sits was purchased in 1919, and the Lytle Company of Sioux City, Iowa drew up the plans in 1921. The present building was constructed from 1922 to 1923. It was prominently located along the most important business corner in Grand Mound, Clinton and Smith Streets. The Lincoln Highway entered Grand Mound from the east along Clinton Street and turned left at the bank onto Smith Street.

Grand Mound was established by the Chicago, Iowa and Nebraska Railroad in 1858 to provide transportation facilities and other services that were directed toward the region's agricultural economy. In the late 19th and early 20th century agricultural production increased and with it prosperity for the local community. The agricultural economy began to trend downward in the early 1920s when the bank was built. It went into receivership in 1926 and was sold to Union Savings Bank of Grand Mound the same year. In time it became one of several small banks owned by First Trust and Savings Bank of Wheatland, Iowa.

== Architecture ==
The Lytle Company was a building contracting company that had an architectural practice as part of its business. The actual architect of this building is unknown, however, the Lytle Company had designed several other banks across Iowa and into South Dakota. The building in Grand Mound combines both classical and modern elements in the structure. The modern appearance is attributed to a new attitude in banking known as "Progressive Banking." The banking industry in this era was thought of as predatory. Progressive Banking was seen as a good business that served the financial needs of the local community, and the architecture was meant to send this message. The bank building is also distinctive in Grand Mound as it is more massive and more decorative than other structures in town.

What is now First Trust and Savings Bank is a two-story, rectangular, brick structure that features off-white terra cotta moldings and details. The corners have massive pier-forms for a building of this size that give the impression of a heavily fortified structure. The piers rise from a raised base that is covered with two colors of terra cotta lining, the upper section is off-white while the lower section is gray granite. The elevations of the building are capped with a broad parapet of brick. It features a pattern that is created by slightly recessed vertical bands that resemble a balustrade. There are also recessed designs on the corner piers. The parapet is outlined with terra cotta stringcourses. The entrance portals and window bays are recessed and flanked by pilasters whose capitols feature a palmette design.

The interior features marble teller windows and a marble urn in the corner. The floor is covered with black and white tile. The second floor is not in use. A suspended ceiling now covers the public space in the open area of the first floor.
