= St. Irenaeus Catholic Church (Clinton, Iowa) =

- Saint Irenaeus Church
- U.S. National Register of Historic Places
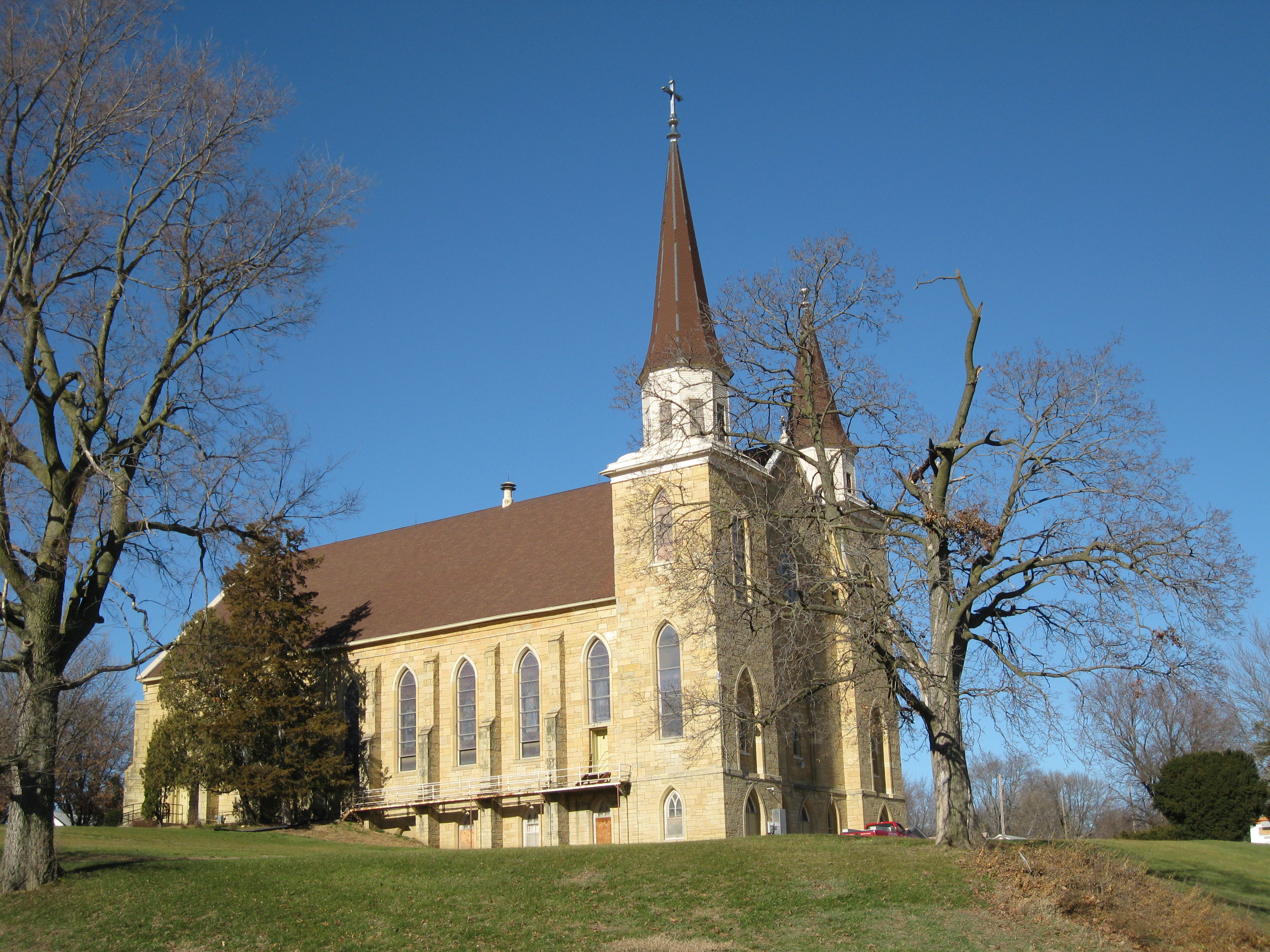

- Location within Iowa Location within the United States
- Location: 2811 N. 2nd St. Clinton, Iowa
- Coordinates: 41°52′41″N 90°10′40″W
- Area: 4 acres (1.6 ha)
- Built: 1871
- Architect: W.W. Sanborn; W.W. Waldron
- Architectural style: Gothic Revival
- NRHP reference No.: 96001589
- Added to NRHP: September 3, 2010

Saint Irenaeus Church is a former parish of the Diocese of Davenport. The church was founded in the town of Lyons, which now the north side of Clinton, Iowa, United States. It has been listed on the National Register of Historic Places since 2010.

== History ==
=== 19th Century ===
Bishop Mathias Loras of the Diocese of Dubuque said the first Mass in Lyons. The Mass was celebrated in a log home in 1848. The area was visited by various priests, including the Rev. J.A.M. Pelamourges from Davenport, and the Rev. Frederic Cyrille Jean, who was assigned as the first resident pastor. Jean was originally from Baynes, France and came to the United States upon the invitation of Bishop Loras. He came to Lyons from Bellevue and started building a church as soon as he arrived and it was completed in 1852. The building was built of brick and cost $1,500 to construct.

The parish grew quickly and a larger church was built in 1856. In 1864 Bishop Clement Smyth laid the cornerstone for the present church. Parishioners helped in building the church without pay. It is a Gothic Revival style building constructed in limestone, which was quarried just outside the town. The building was completed in 1871 and cost the parish $45,000. The building measure 130 by 60 feet and could accommodate 450 people. The ceiling is 50 feet (15 m) off the floor. The stained glass windows depict the Twelve Apostles. Two offset spires front the building. The south spires rises 166 feet (51 m) and the north spire is 136 feet (41 m) high.

Father Jean returned to his native France before the church was completed. While there he was given ornate golden chandelier modeled after the crown of France. It was a gift from the Bonaparte family to the parish to be used as the sanctuary lamp.

The parish school was built at the same time as the church. It cost $4,000 to build and it was staffed by the Sisters of Charity of the Blessed Virgin Mary from Dubuque.

In 1861 the German members of the parish formed their own parish a few blocks away called St. Boniface. That left St. Irenaeus a predominantly Irish parish. Other parishes were formed to the south in Clinton: St. Mary's (1867), St. Patrick's (1889), and Sacred Heart (1891).

=== 20th Century ===
In 1906 the church building was completely reversed. Initially, the main entrance of the church faced Fifth Street. North Second Street on the back side of the church became a major thoroughfare through town. To accommodate the change the main entrance of the church was moved to the west side of the church on Second Street and the altar was moved to the east side of the church and the pews were reversed to face the altar. The new entrance also eliminated the long staircases up to the entrances. A gallery was created on the west side of the church. In 1911 all five Clinton parishes joined the Davenport Diocese when Clinton County was transferred to the Diocese of Davenport.

A major renovation occurred to the church interior in the 1940s. Simulated stone was applied to the walls to match the exterior of the church, Gothic-style light fixtures were hung, new Stations of the Cross were installed along the side walls and the ceiling was decorated with simulated beams. In the 1960s and 70s, a parish hall, kitchen, meeting rooms and restrooms were built in the basement of the church.

The parish school was merged with the school at St. Boniface in the 1970s to form North Catholic School. Eventually, all the Catholic grade schools in Clinton merged to form Prince of Peace School. The parish itself was officially closed in 2006 when the five parishes in Clinton were merged to form Jesus Christ, Prince of Peace Parish.

=== 21st Century ===
Jesus Christ, Prince of Peace continued to use the old churches until 2008 when a new church was built for the parish on the west side of town. The sanctuary lamp and the older set of the Stations of the Cross were used in the new church. St. Patrick's Church was taken down in 2005 and St. Mary's followed in 2009. Sacred Heart Church is a part of the Prince of Peace School complex and is used for their liturgical needs. A non-profit organization is being formed to preserve St. Boniface Church building as a religious heritage museum. The last Mass at St. Irenaeus was celebrated June 28, 2009, and the church was sold to the Clinton County Historical Society in June 2010. It was recently bought by the Gabbard family for $1 and they are currently restoring it to its former glory, in order that it might provide the Traditional Latin Mass for the community
