= Grand Mound Town Hall and Waterworks Historic District =

Historic district in Iowa, United States

- U.S. National Register of Historic Places
- U.S. Historic district
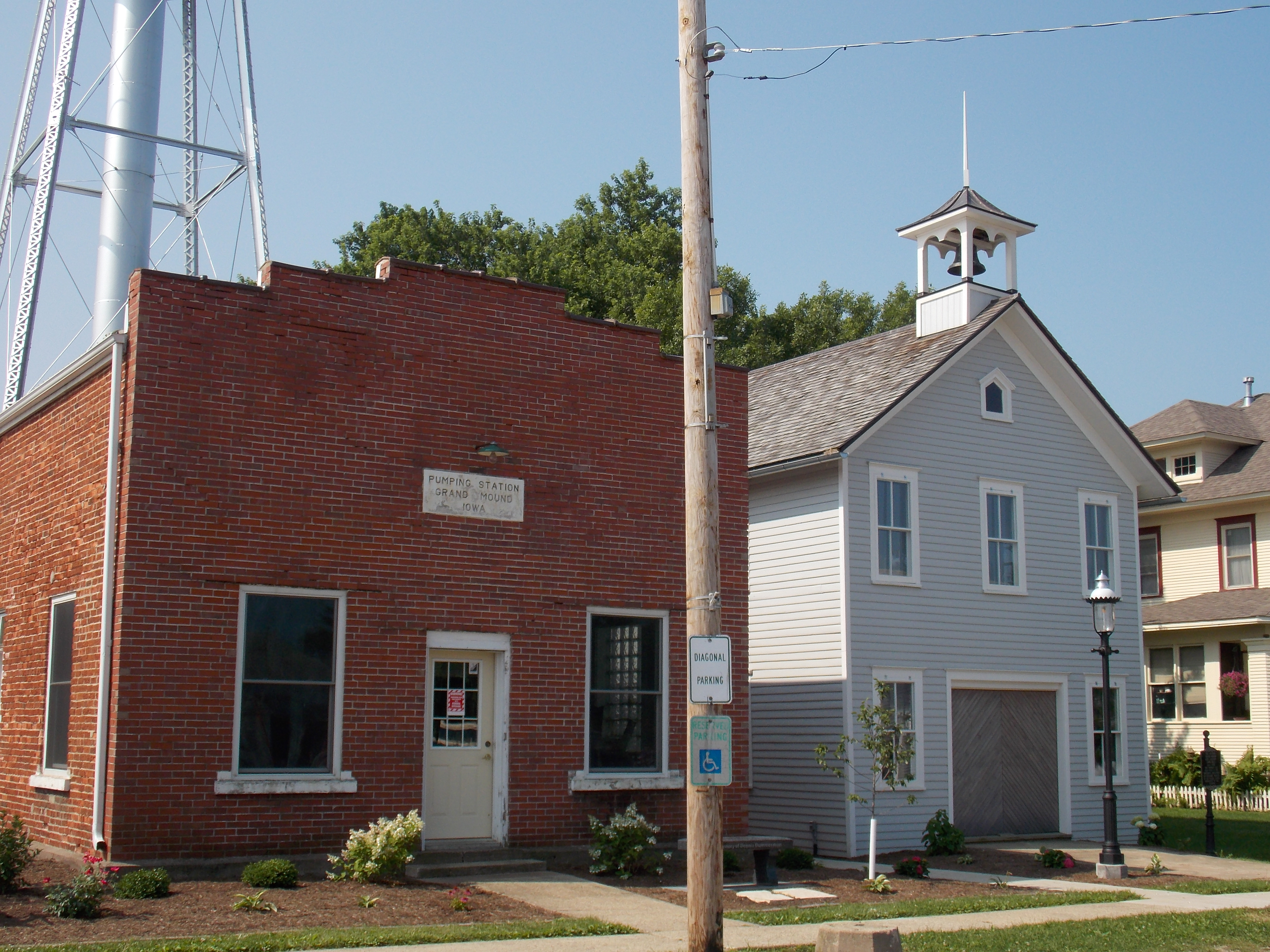

- Location within Iowa Location within the United States
- Location: 613-615 Clinton St. Grand Mound, Iowa
- Coordinates: 41°49′26.05″N 90°38′55.23″W
- Area: less than one acre
- Built: 1892 (town hall); 1915 (waterworks)
- Architect: Gustav Ahlff (town hall); Iowa Engineering Company (water tower)
- NRHP reference No.: 01000910
- Added to NRHP: August 30, 2001

Grand Mound Town Hall and Waterworks Historic District, also known as Hose house, pump house, is a historic district located in Grand Mound, Iowa, United States. It was listed on the National Register of Historic Places in 2001. The district is composed of two buildings and the town's water tower.

== Town Hall ==
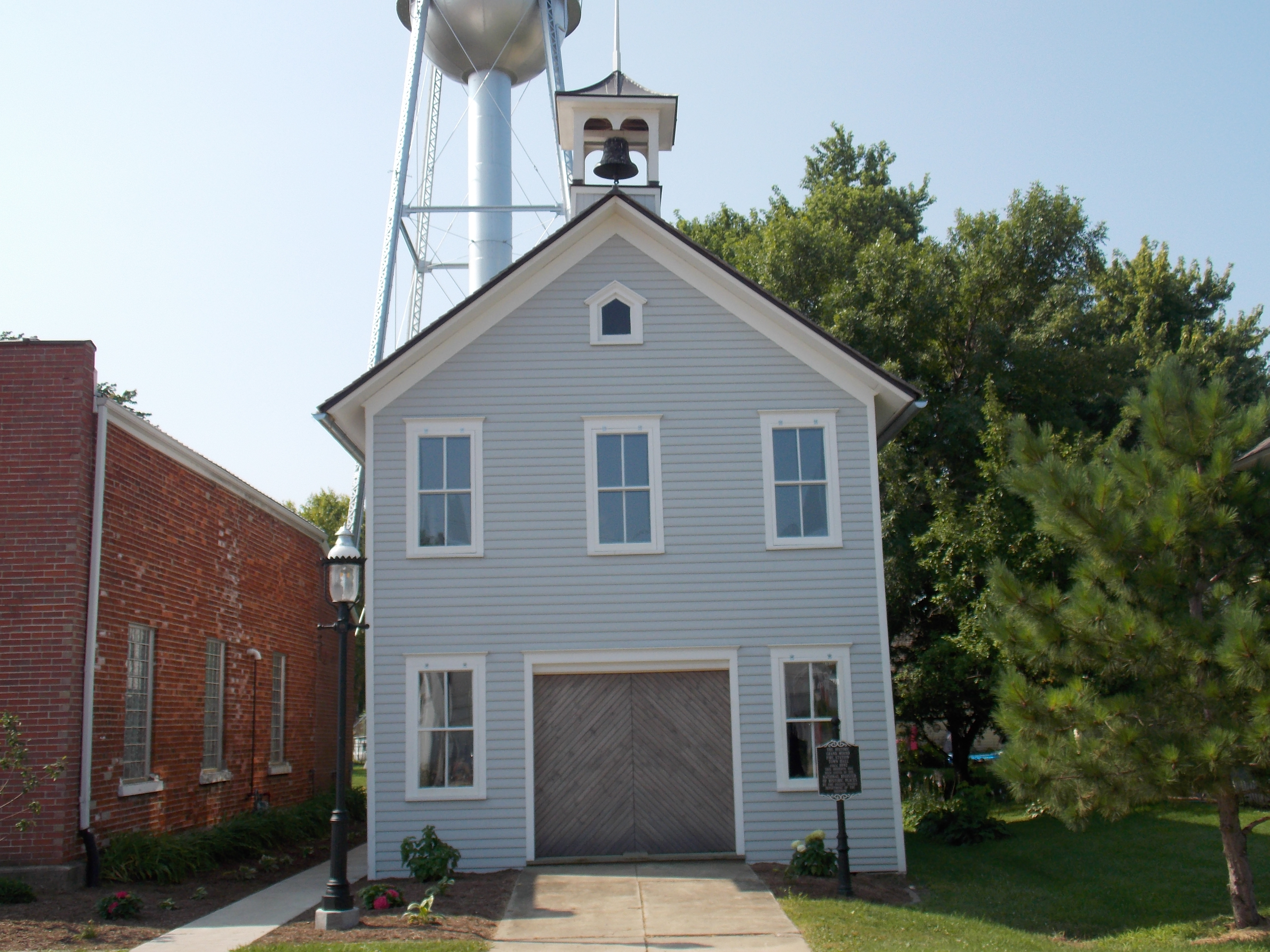
Former Town Hall

The former town hall is a two-story frame structure with a gable front. It was designed by Gustav Ahlff, who owned a local lumber yard, weigh station, and clay tile manufacturing company. It is a 20 by 32 feet (6.1 by 9.8 m) structure. The main facade is three bays wide. The first floor features a central garage door that is flanked by two windows. The second floor has three windows that match those on the first floor. The entrance to the upstairs is on the south side of the east elevation. The building is capped with a belfry with a bell. The original bell is now part of a monument located in front of the pump house. The interior of the building features a single room on each floor, and a stairway at the back of the building. It is thought that an area on the main floors southwest corner may have been the location of an early jail that consisted of a single cell.

The building lacks ornamentation because the town council did not think it was appropriate to build a monument to themselves or to the government with taxpayer dollars. Henry Ehlers submitted the lowest bid of $675, which was accepted on July 2, 1892. After it was built the town hall was used by a variety social groups in addition to town government. A town marshal was hired in 1894 and the jail cell was created at that time and was used until 1936. Besides the jail cell, the first floor was used to house the town's fire-fighting equipment. The second floor was used as a council chambers until a new town hall was built in 1955. The old building became known as the "Pump House", although there is no evidence that it was ever used for that purpose.

== Pump House ==
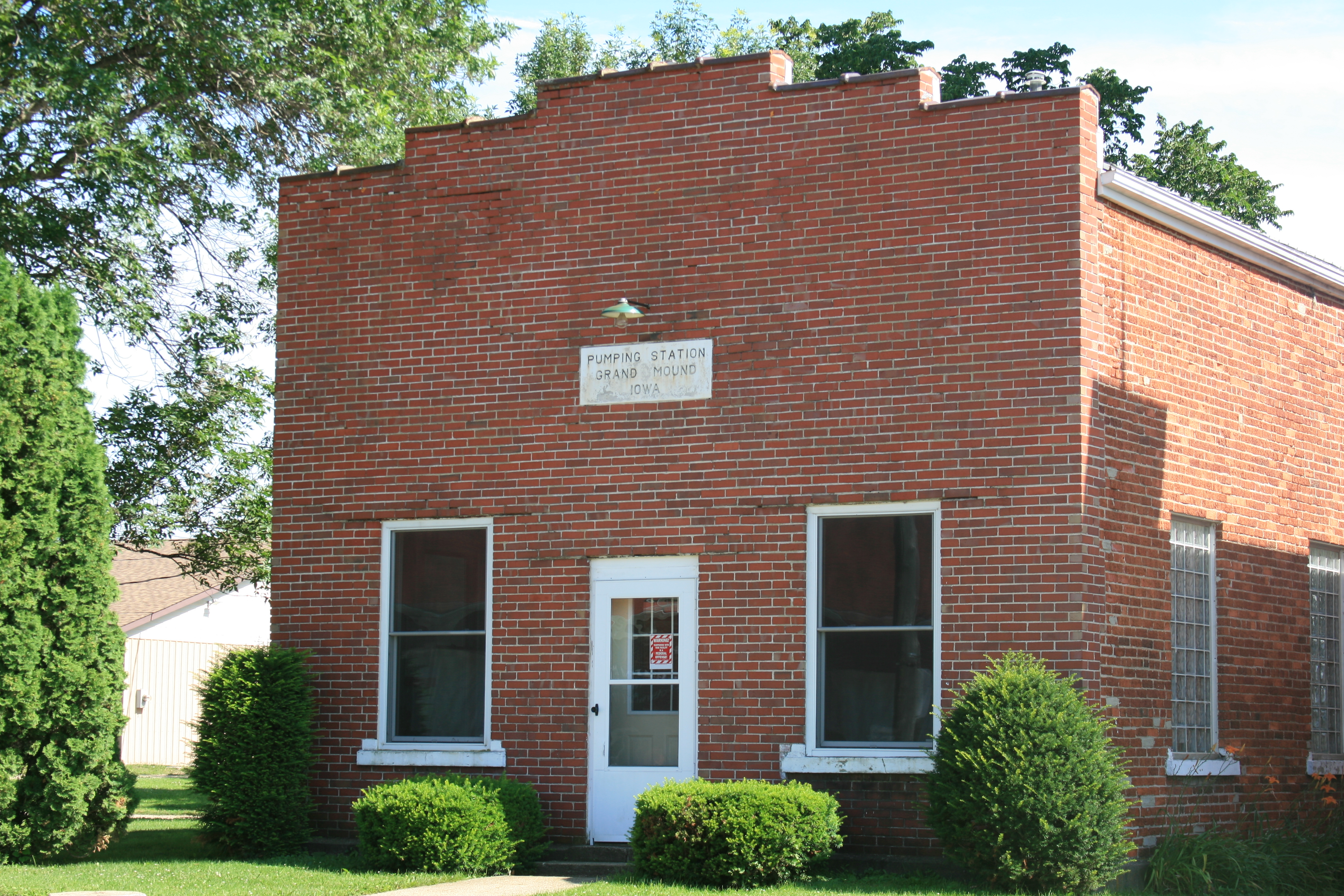
Pumping Station

Grand Mound installed its first water system in 1898 and built a frame building to house it. Oral tradition in the town relates that the original pump was destroyed by an explosion caused by a spark set off by the fuel. The present building was built on the location of the original pump house in 1915. The single-story brick structure measures 20 by 24 feet (6.1 by 7.3 m). The main facade features a shallow stepped gable. The main entrance is flanked by windows, and a secondary entrance is located on the east side. Additions were added to the rear and east sides of the structure. The first addition is 11 by 13 feet (3.4 by 4.0 m) and constructed of brick. The brick, however, does not match that of the original structure. It is located on the west side of the south elevation. Another addition is a garage that is composed of cement block. The pumping equipment was replaced in the late 1960s. A prefabricated pavilion was built behind the pump house in 1968 for picnics that are routinely held on the property.

== Water Tower ==
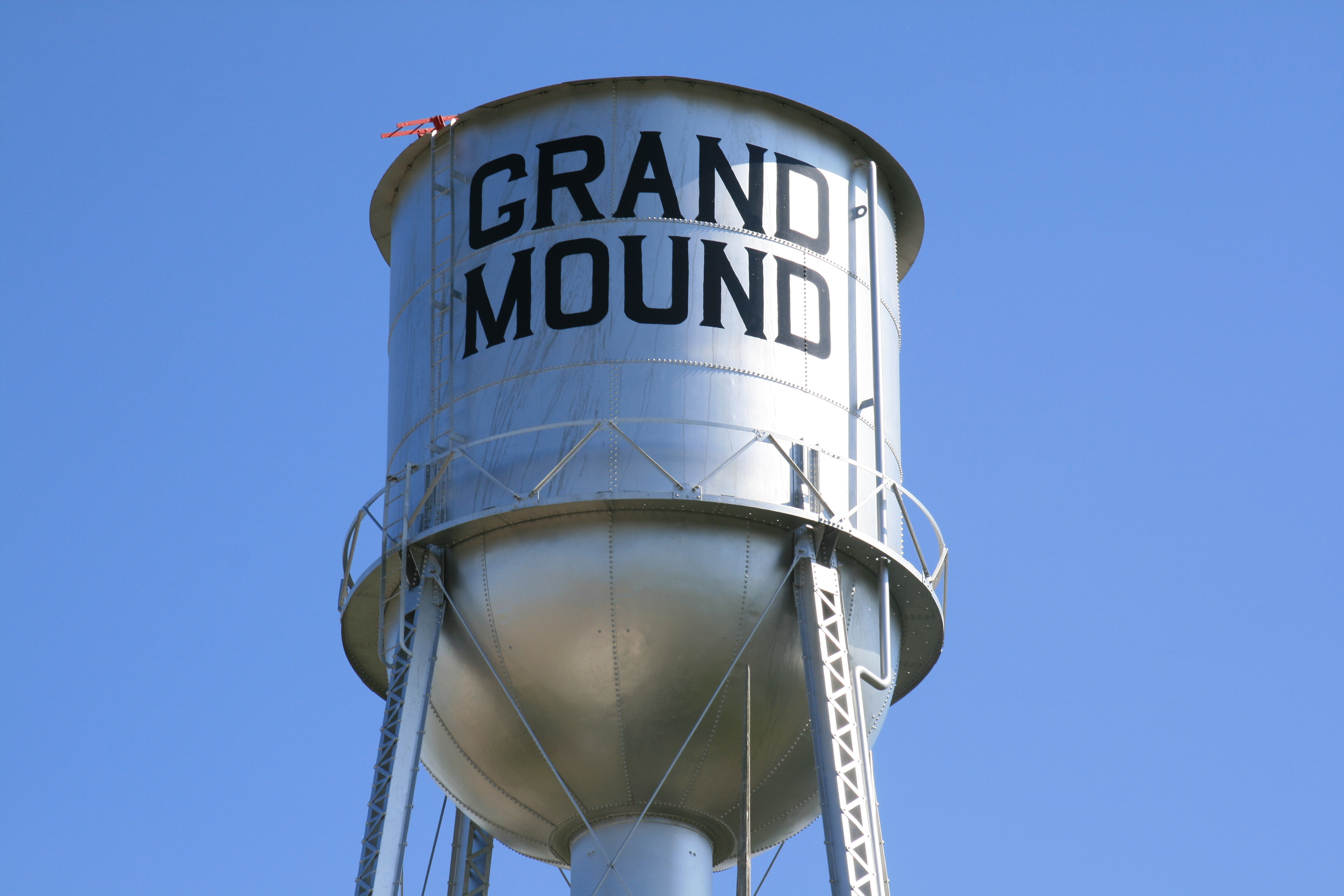
Water Tower

The tank for the previous water tower, located on the square at Fulton and Smith Streets, had been condemned in 1914. The present water tower was built and a deep well was dug in 1915. The water tower is 80 feet (24 m) feet tall and it is capped with a 50,000-US-gallon (190 kl) steel tank. The trusses that make up the tower are 32 feet (10 m) apart. The tank is 32 feet (10 m) in diameter. It was designed by the Iowa Engineering Company of Clinton, Iowa, and constructed by the Des Moines Bridge and Iron Company.
