= Lost Nation, Iowa =

- City
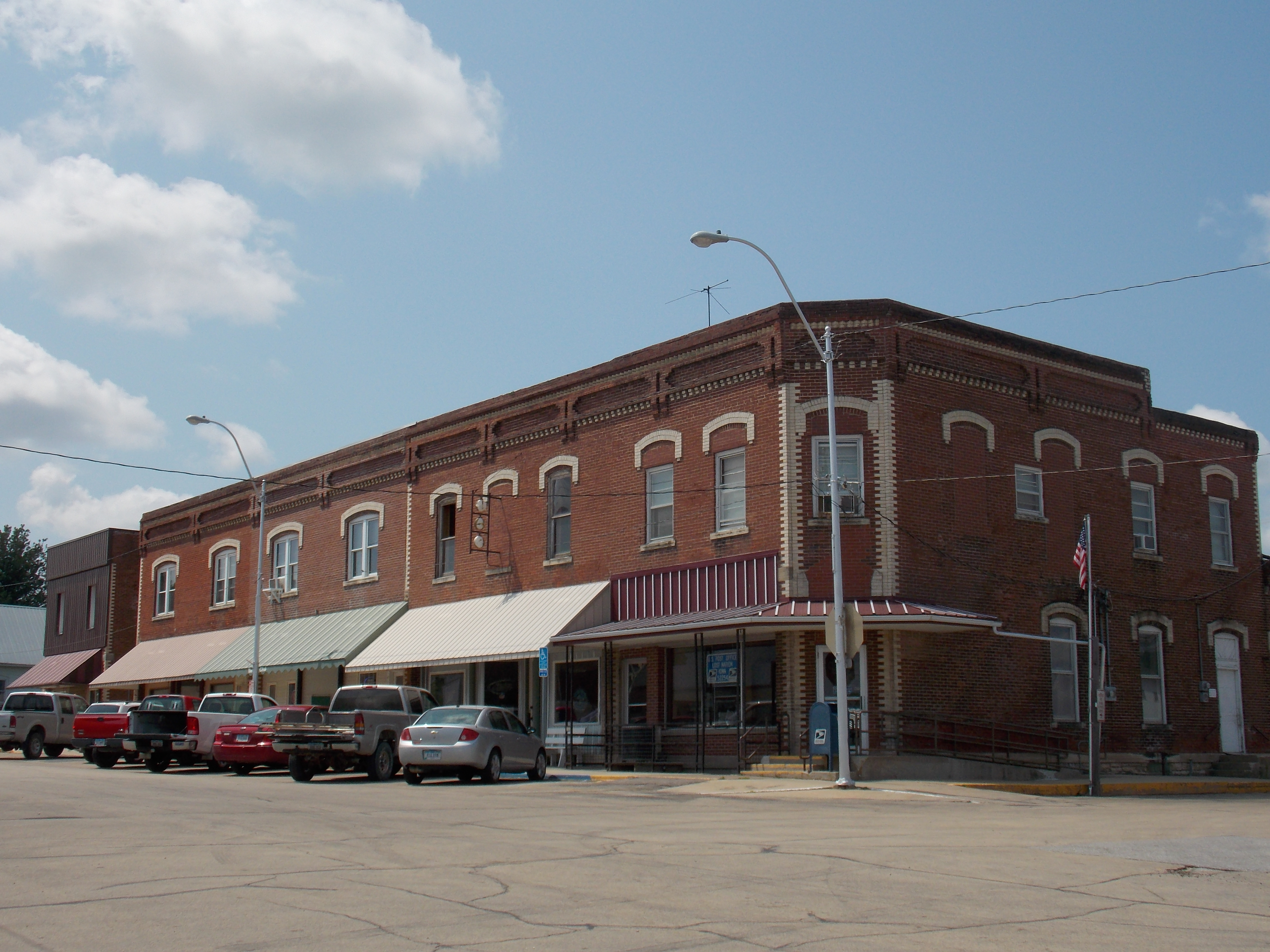
- Downtown Lost Nation, Iowa

- Location of Lost Nation, Iowa
- Coordinates: 41°58′03″N 90°49′05″W
- Country: United States
- State: Iowa
- County: Clinton
- Incorporated: July 9, 1903

Area
  - Total: 0.76 sq mi (1.96 km^{2})
  - Land: 0.76 sq mi (1.96 km^{2})
  - Water: 0 sq mi (0.00 km^{2})
- Elevation: 751 ft (229 m)

Population (2020)
  - Total: 434
  - Density: 573.8/sq mi (221.55/km^{2})
- Time zone: UTC-6 (Central (CST))
  - Summer (DST): UTC-5 (CDT)
- ZIP code: 52254
- Area code: 563
- FIPS code: 19-46605
- GNIS feature ID: 2395767
- Website: lostnationiowa.org

Lost Nation is a city in Clinton County, Iowa, United States. The population was 434 at the time of the 2020 census.

== History ==
The area which would later formally become Lost Nation was known by that name as early as 1855, though the origin of the name is unknown. Lost Nation was platted in 1872 and became an incorporated community in July 1903. A train station was established along the Sabula, Ackley and Dakota railroad in 1871. In 1911, the town was one of the few small towns in the eastern part of the state to be powered by electricity.

== Geography ==
According to the United States Census Bureau, the city has a total area of 0.64 square miles (1.66 km^{2}), all land.

== Demographics ==
Historical populations
Year	Pop.	±%
1910	523	—
1920	537	+2.7%
1930	493	−8.2%
1940	493	+0.0%
1950	557	+13.0%
1960	567	+1.8%
1970	547	−3.5%
1980	524	−4.2%
1990	467	−10.9%
2000	497	+6.4%
2010	446	−10.3%
2020	434	−2.7%
Source:"U.S. Census website". United States Census Bureau. and Iowa Data Center; Source: U.S. Decennial Census

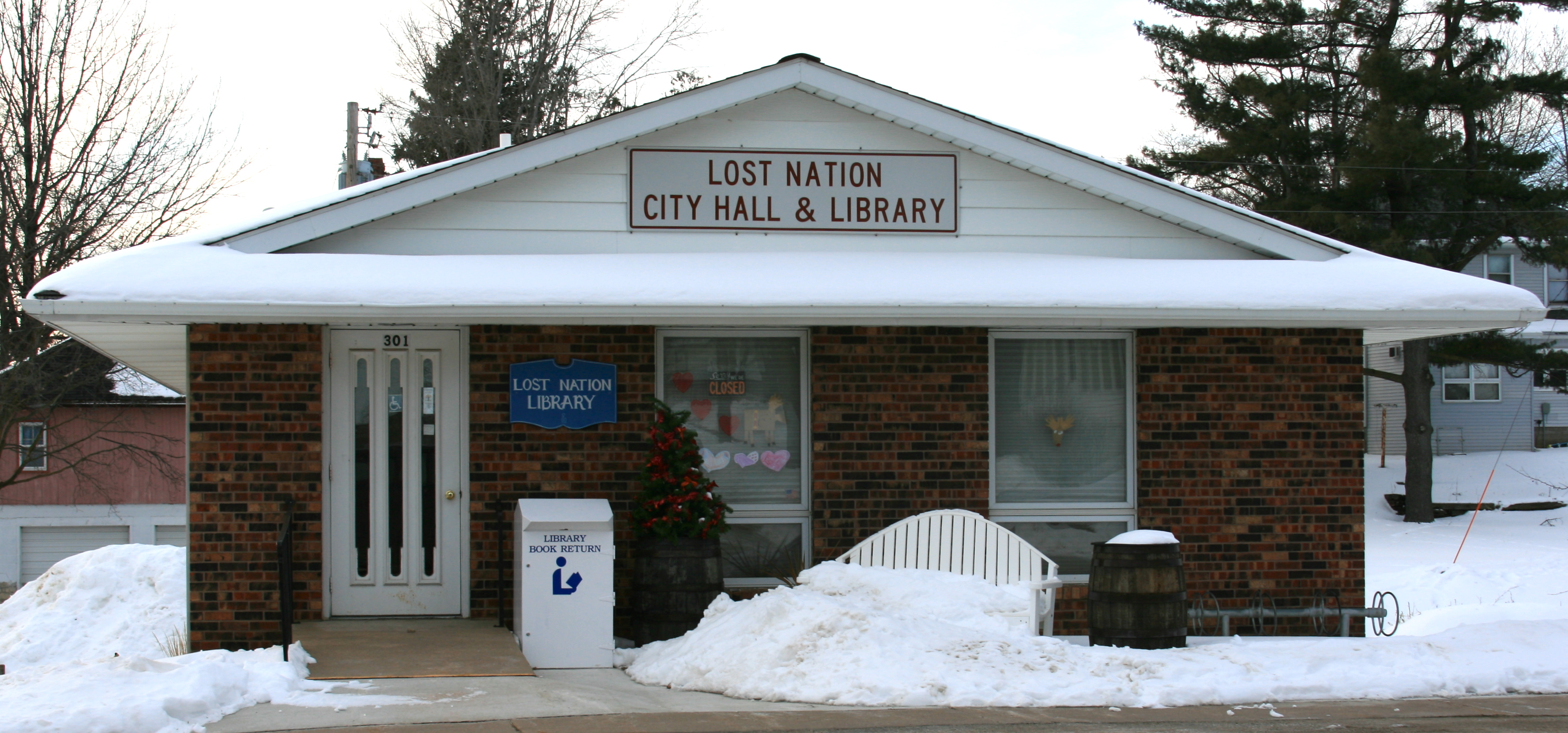
Lost Nation city hall and library

=== 2020 census ===
As of the census of 2020, there were 434 people, 204 households, and 117 families residing in the city. The population density was 573.8 inhabitants per square mile (221.5/km^{2}). There were 218 housing units at an average density of 288.2 per square mile (111.3/km^{2}). The racial makeup of the city was 93.3% White, 0.5% Black or African American, 0.2% Native American, 0.7% Asian, 0.0% Pacific Islander, 0.7% from other races and 4.6% from two or more races. Hispanic or Latino persons of any race comprised 1.2% of the population.

Of the 204 households, 27.5% of which had children under the age of 18 living with them, 41.2% were married couples living together, 8.3% were cohabitating couples, 27.0% had a female householder with no spouse or partner present and 23.5% had a male householder with no spouse or partner present. 42.6% of all households were non-families. 38.2% of all households were made up of individuals, 17.6% had someone living alone who was 65 years old or older.

The median age in the city was 44.3 years. 24.9% of the residents were under the age of 20; 3.2% were between the ages of 20 and 24; 22.6% were from 25 and 44; 25.6% were from 45 and 64; and 23.7% were 65 years of age or older. The gender makeup of the city was 47.2% male and 52.8% female.

=== 2010 census ===
As of the census of 2010, there were 446 people, 201 households, and 120 families living in the city. The population density was 696.9 inhabitants per square mile (269.1/km^{2}). There were 221 housing units at an average density of 345.3 per square mile (133.3/km^{2}). The racial makeup of the city was 99.1% White and 0.9% African American. Hispanic or Latino of any race were 1.3% of the population.

There were 201 households, of which 25.9% had children under the age of 18 living with them, 45.3% were married couples living together, 8.5% had a female householder with no husband present, 6.0% had a male householder with no wife present, and 40.3% were non-families. 36.8% of all households were made up of individuals, and 18.9% had someone living alone who was 65 years of age or older. The average household size was 2.22 and the average family size was 2.85.

The median age in the city was 44.2 years. 23.3% of residents were under the age of 18; 5.9% were between the ages of 18 and 24; 21.8% were from 25 to 44; 29.3% were from 45 to 64; and 19.7% were 65 years of age or older. The gender makeup of the city was 47.8% male and 52.2% female.

=== 2000 census ===
As of the census of 2000, there were 497 people, 210 households, and 136 families living in the city. The population density was 773.7 inhabitants per square mile (298.7/km^{2}). There were 225 housing units at an average density of 350.3 per square mile (135.3/km^{2}). The racial makeup of the city was 98.99% White, 0.20% Asian, and 0.80% from two or more races. Hispanic or Latino of any race were 0.80% of the population.

There were 210 households, out of which 30.0% had children under the age of 18 living with them, 52.4% were married couples living together, 7.6% had a female householder with no husband present, and 34.8% were non-families. 30.5% of all households were made up of individuals, and 21.0% had someone living alone who was 65 years of age or older. The average household size was 2.37 and the average family size was 2.88.

In the city, the population was spread out, with 26.2% under the age of 18, 8.9% from 18 to 24, 22.1% from 25 to 44, 21.5% from 45 to 64, and 21.3% who were 65 years of age or older. The median age was 39 years. For every 100 females, there were 84.8 males. For every 100 females age 18 and over, there were 83.5 males.

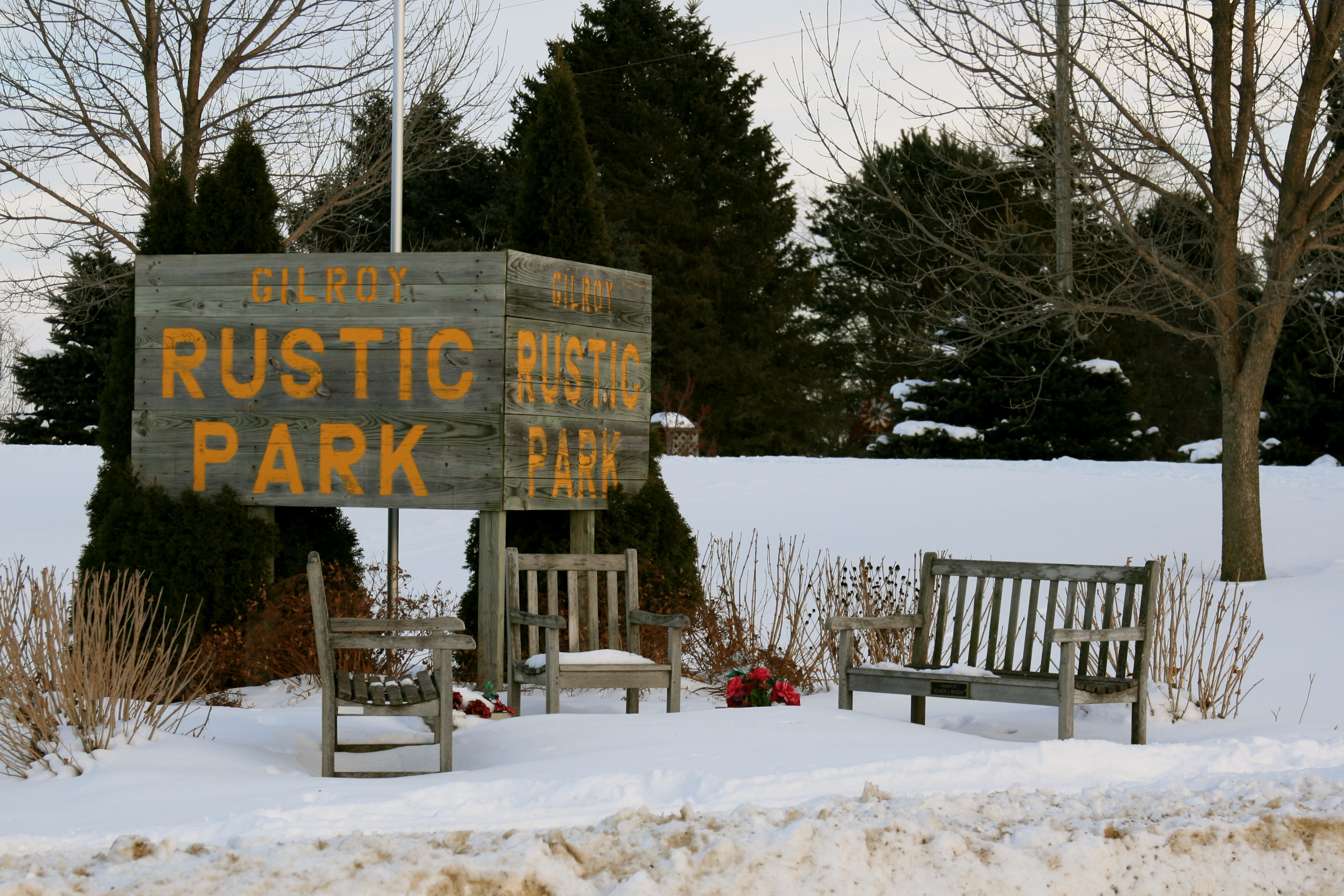
Gilroy Rustic Park

The median income for a household in the city was $31,354, and the median income for a family was $34,792. Males had a median income of $27,708 versus $20,714 for females. The per capita income for the city was $13,933. About 15.4% of families and 15.3% of the population were below the poverty line, including 17.2% of those under age 18 and 14.6% of those age 65 or over.

== Arts and culture ==
=== Annual events ===
==== Rustic Days ====
The annual Rustic Days in Lost Nation take place during the third weekend of July. Rustic Days include a Rustic Run, a parade, and a street dance. Irma Neiber is the treasurer.

== Education ==
It is within the Midland Community School District. The Lost Nation school district merged into the Midland district on July 1, 1993.

== Notable people ==
- Jim McAndrew (1944–2024), Major League Baseball pitcher and World Series Champion for the New York Mets
- Ken Ploen (1935-2024), football player
- Joe Seng (1946-2016), Iowa state legislator
- George Stone (1876–1945), Major League Baseball left fielder and AL batting champion

== See also ==
- Sharon Methodist Episcopal Church, also known as Smithtown Church, is located north of town and is listed on the National Register of Historic Places.
