= Delmar, Iowa =

- City
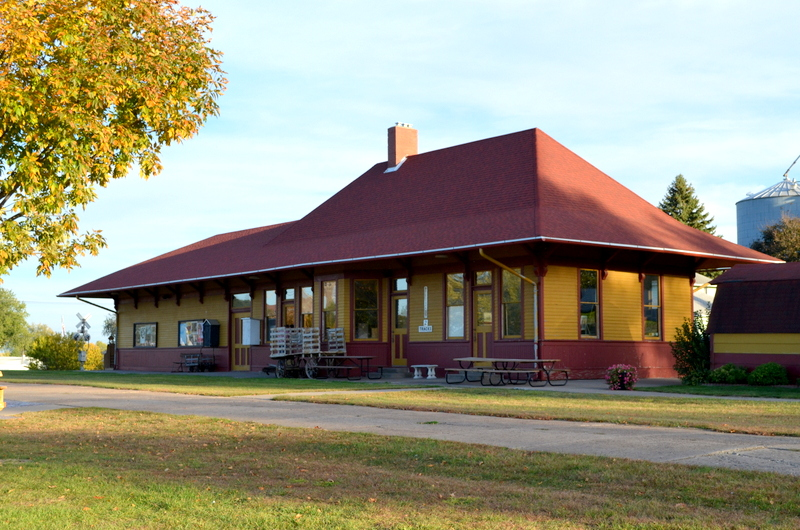
- Chicago, Milwaukee, St. Paul & Pacific Depot

- Location of Delmar, Iowa
- Coordinates: 42°0′6″N 90°36′28″W
- Country: United States
- State: Iowa
- County: Clinton

Area
  - Total: 0.76 sq mi (1.98 km^{2})
  - Land: 0.76 sq mi (1.98 km^{2})
  - Water: 0 sq mi (0.00 km^{2})
- Elevation: 810 ft (250 m)

Population (2020)
  - Total: 542
  - Density: 709.3/sq mi (273.88/km^{2})
- Time zone: UTC-6 (Central (CST))
  - Summer (DST): UTC-5 (CDT)
- ZIP code: 52037
- Area code: 563
- FIPS code: 19-19720
- GNIS feature ID: 2394505
- Website: delmariowa.org

Delmar (Note: /ˈdɛlmər/ or /ˈdɛlmɑːr/) is a city in Clinton County, Iowa, United States. The population was 542 at the time of the 2020 census.

== History ==
Delmar was platted in 1871, shortly after the railroad was built through the site. The name Delmar is said to be a combination of the initials of the six ladies on the first train to arrive into the station: Della, Emma, Laura, Marie, Anna, and Rose. Le Mars, Iowa was similarly so named.

== Geography ==
According to the United States Census Bureau, the city has a total area of 0.76 square miles (1.97 km^{2}), all land.

== Demographics ==
Historical populations
Year	Pop.	±%
1880	410	—
1890	518	+26.3%
1900	592	+14.3%
1910	548	−7.4%
1920	527	−3.8%
1930	480	−8.9%
1940	434	−9.6%
1950	415	−4.4%
1960	556	+34.0%
1970	599	+7.7%
1980	633	+5.7%
1990	517	−18.3%
2000	514	−0.6%
2010	525	+2.1%
2020	542	+3.2%
Source:"U.S. Census website". United States Census Bureau. and Iowa Data Center; Source: U.S. Decennial Census

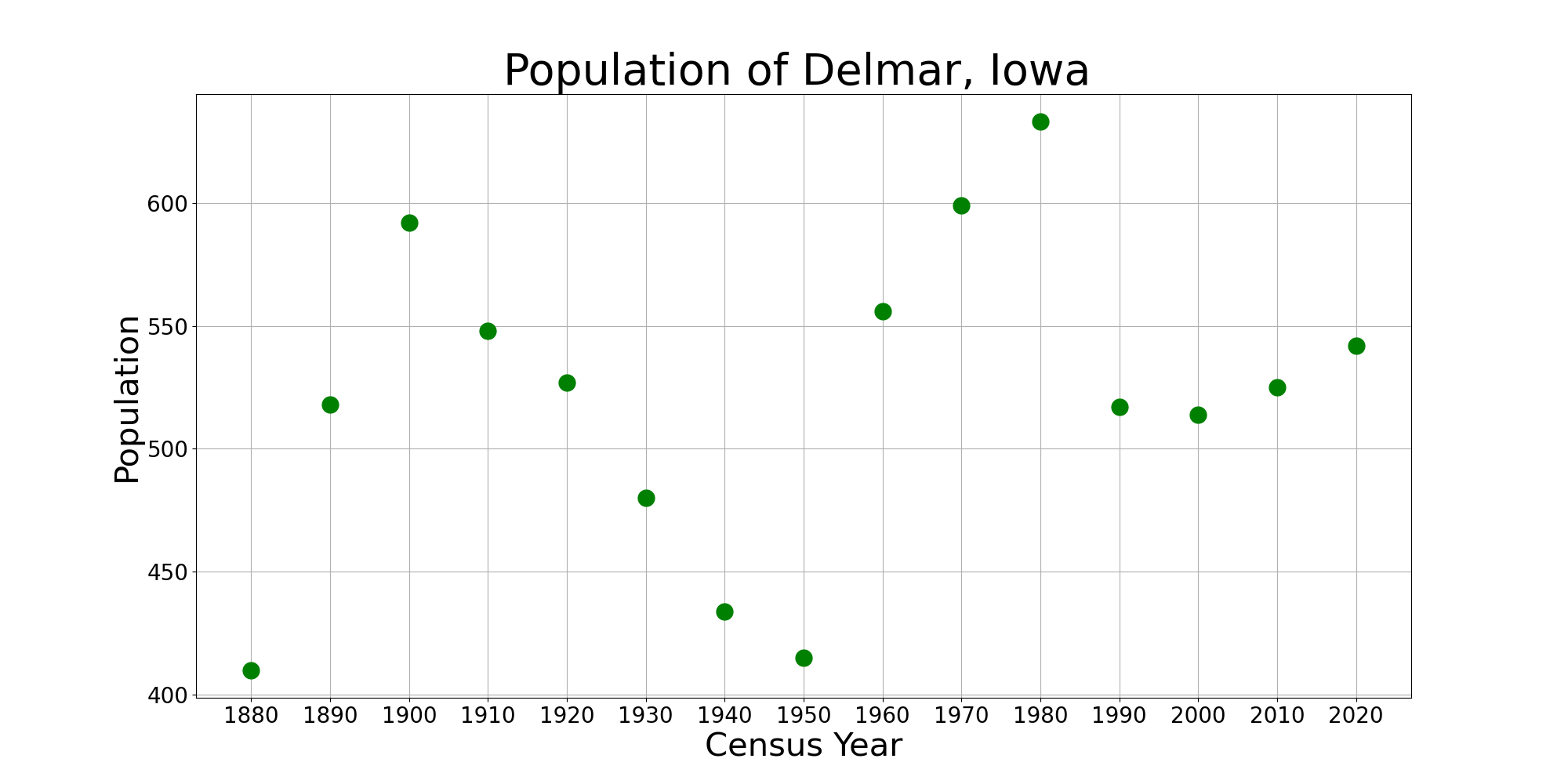
The population of Delmar, Iowa from US census data

=== 2020 census ===
As of the census of 2020, there were 542 people, 208 households, and 147 families residing in the city. The population density was 709.3 inhabitants per square mile (273.9/km^{2}). There were 213 housing units at an average density of 278.8 per square mile (107.6/km^{2}). The racial makeup of the city was 89.3% White, 4.2% Black or African American, 0.6% Native American, 0.0% Asian, 0.0% Pacific Islander, 0.7% from other races and 5.2% from two or more races. Hispanic or Latino persons of any race comprised 2.2% of the population.

Of the 208 households, 35.6% of which had children under the age of 18 living with them, 53.4% were married couples living together, 10.1% were cohabitating couples, 21.6% had a female householder with no spouse or partner present and 14.9% had a male householder with no spouse or partner present. 29.3% of all households were non-families. 23.1% of all households were made up of individuals, 11.5% had someone living alone who was 65 years old or older.

The median age in the city was 35.9 years. 31.4% of the residents were under the age of 20; 6.5% were between the ages of 20 and 24; 22.5% were from 25 and 44; 23.8% were from 45 and 64; and 15.9% were 65 years of age or older. The gender makeup of the city was 48.0% male and 52.0% female.

=== 2010 census ===
As of the census of 2010, there were 525 people, 213 households, and 145 families living in the city. The population density was 690.8 inhabitants per square mile (266.7/km^{2}). There were 227 housing units at an average density of 298.7 per square mile (115.3/km^{2}). The racial makeup of the city was 97.0% White, 1.5% African American, 0.2% Native American, 0.2% Asian, and 1.1% from two or more races. Hispanic or Latino of any race were 1.5% of the population.

There were 213 households, of which 33.8% had children under the age of 18 living with them, 54.0% were married couples living together, 8.0% had a female householder with no husband present, 6.1% had a male householder with no wife present, and 31.9% were non-families. 28.6% of all households were made up of individuals, and 12.6% had someone living alone who was 65 years of age or older. The average household size was 2.46 and the average family size was 3.03.

The median age in the city was 38.5 years. 27% of residents were under the age of 18; 5.5% were between the ages of 18 and 24; 27.1% were from 25 to 44; 24.8% were from 45 to 64; and 15.6% were 65 years of age or older. The gender makeup of the city was 49.7% male and 50.3% female.

=== 2000 census ===
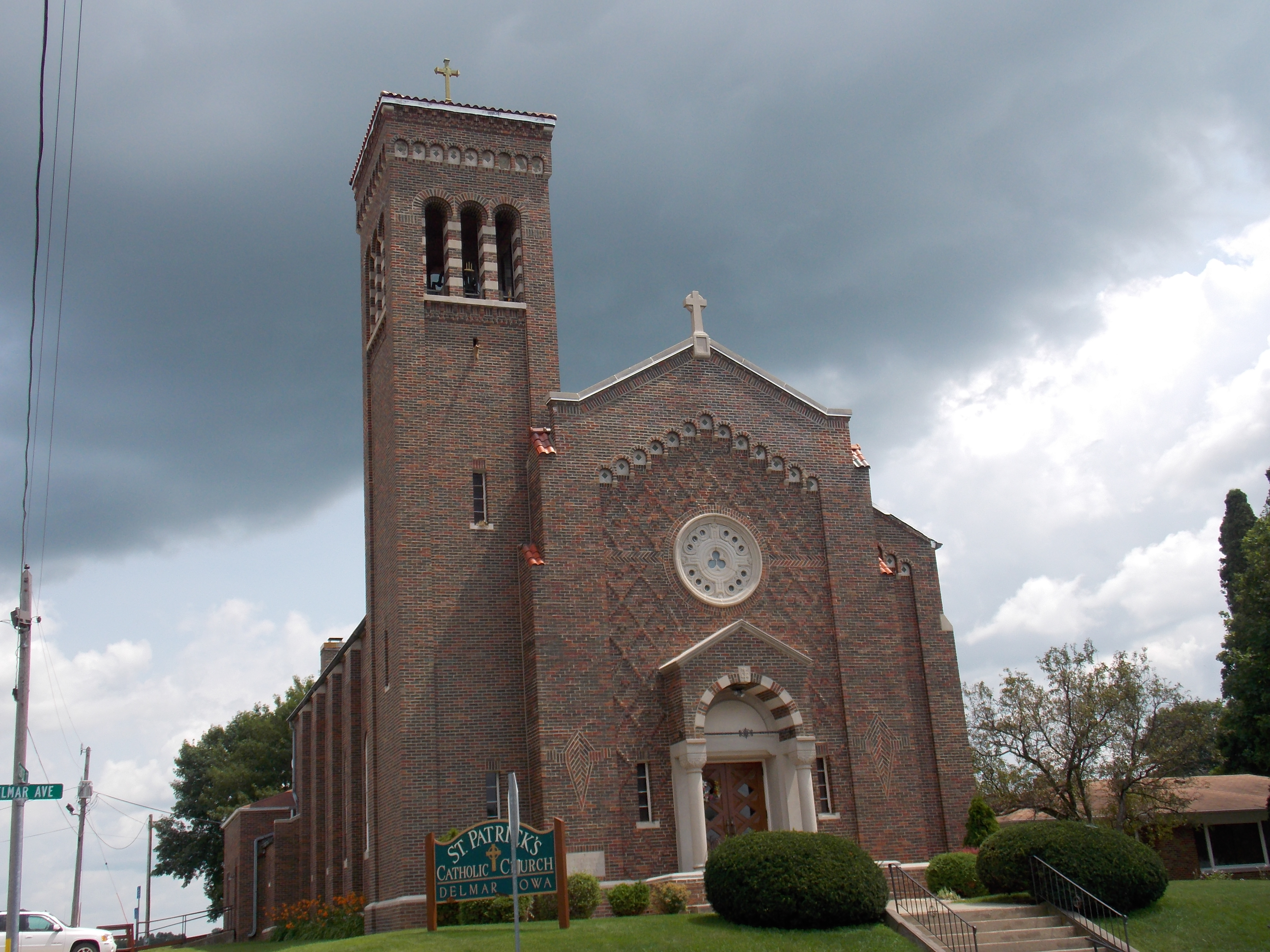
St. Patrick's Catholic Church

As of the census of 2000, there were 514 people, 195 households, and 141 families living in the city. The population density was 671.9 inhabitants per square mile (259.4/km^{2}). There were 210 housing units at an average density of 274.5 per square mile (106.0/km^{2}). The racial makeup of the city was 99.42% White, 0.19% Native American, 0.19% Asian, and 0.19% from two or more races. Hispanic or Latino of any race were 0.58% of the population.

There were 195 households, out of which 37.9% had children under the age of 18 living with them, 60.5% were married couples living together, 7.7% had a female householder with no husband present, and 27.2% were non-families. 25.6% of all households were made up of individuals, and 15.4% had someone living alone who was 65 years of age or older. The average household size was 2.64 and the average family size was 3.15.

30.9% are under the age of 18, 6.0% from 18 to 24, 27.6% from 25 to 44, 20.0% from 45 to 64, and 15.4% who were 65 years of age or older. The median age was 36 years. For every 100 females, there were 91.1 males. For every 100 females age 18 and over, there were 87.8 males.

The median income for a household in the city was $29,375, and the median income for a family was $37,750. Males had a median income of $28,125 versus $18,125 for females. The per capita income for the city was $14,469. About 7.5% of families and 6.7% of the population were below the poverty line, including 3.6% of those under age 18 and 18.4% of those age 65 or over.

== Education ==
Delmar and Elwood Schools consolidated in 1962 to form the Delwood Community School District. Delwood began whole-grade sharing with nearby Maquoketa in the 1980s, Students in grades 7-12 attend Maquoketa Community High School, while grades Pre-K through 6 remain at the Delwood School in Delmar.

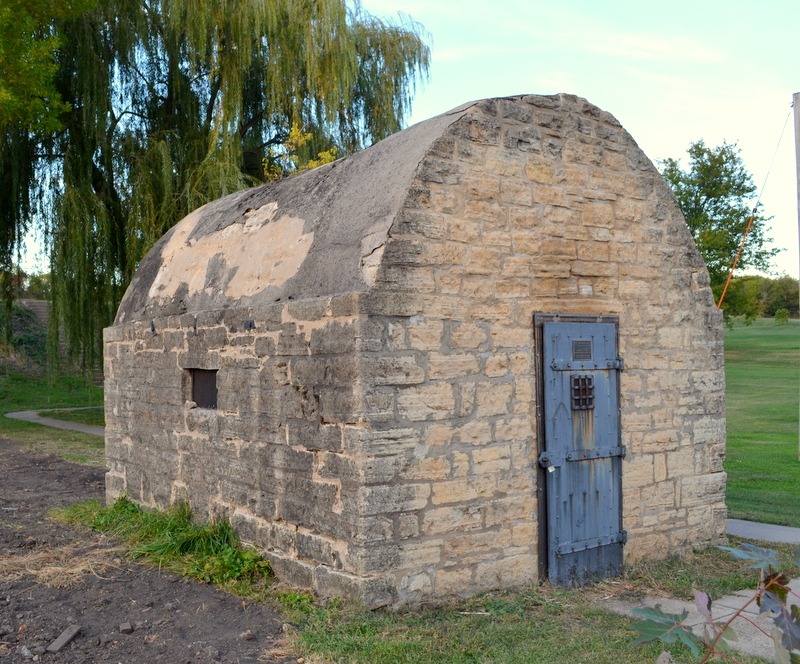
Delmar Calaboose

== See also ==
The following buildings in Delmar are listed on the National Register of Historic Places:

- Chicago, Milwaukee, St. Paul & Pacific Depot- Delmar
- Delmar Calaboose
