= City Hotel (Wheatland, Iowa) =

- U.S. National Register of Historic Places
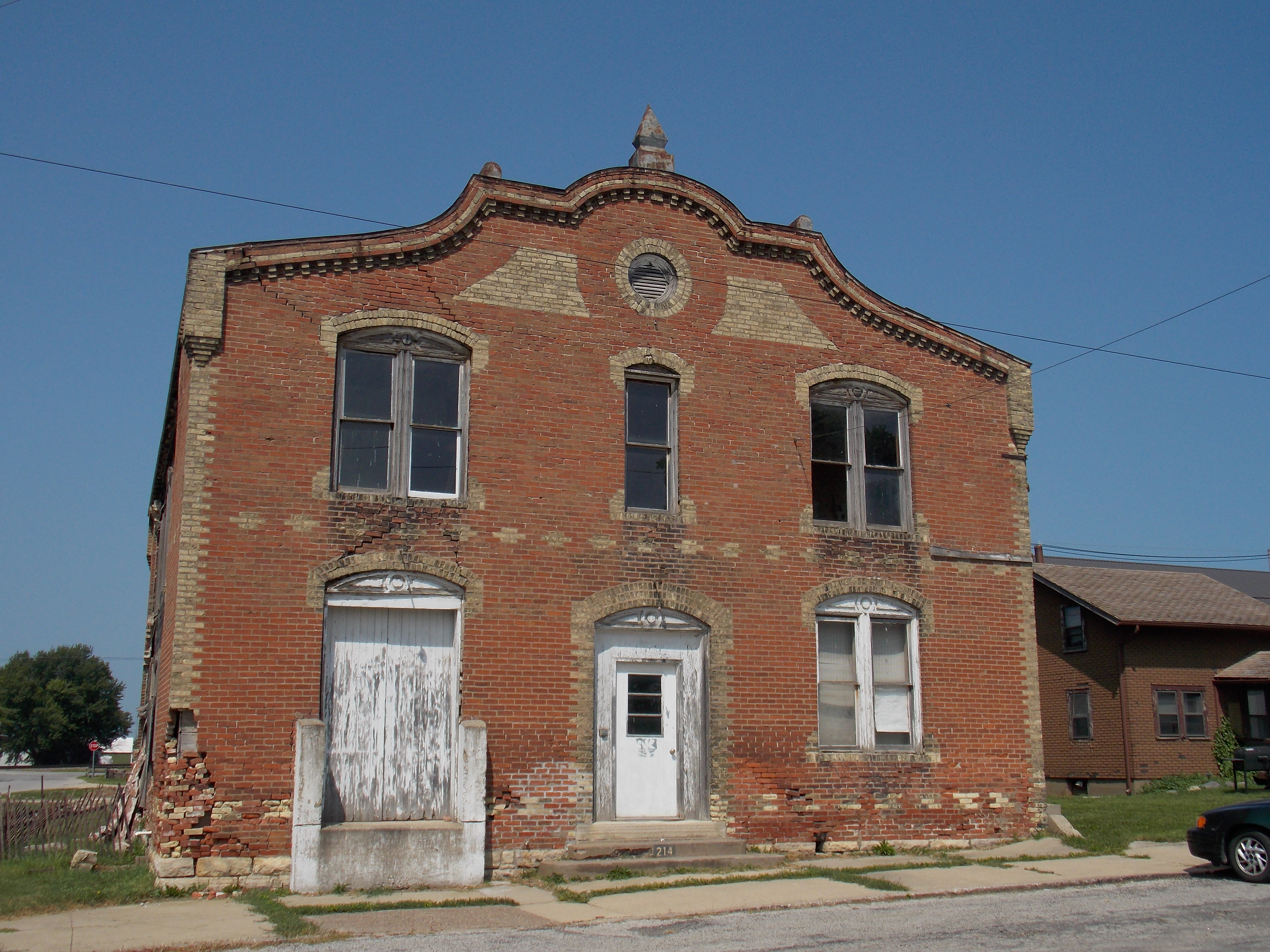

- Location within Iowa Location within the United States
- Location: 214 S. Main St. Wheatland, Iowa
- Coordinates: 41°49′51″N 90°50′20″W
- Area: less than one acre
- Built: 1893
- Architect: Antheona Araah
- Architectural style: Late Victorian
- NRHP reference No.: 07001031
- Added to NRHP: October 3, 2007

City Hotel, also known as Seifert's Tavern and the Wheatland Feed Mill, on 214 South Main Street in Wheatland, Iowa was listed on the National Register of Historic Places for Clinton County, Iowa in 2007.

== History ==
The town of Wheatland was established in 1858 by New York native John L. Bennett to take advantage of the Chicago & North Western Railway (C&NW) that was being built through southern Clinton County at the same time. This was the second hotel built on this site near the C&NW depot. It was designed by Antheona Araah, an Italian-born artist/photographer who also was involved in designing and constructing buildings. He was based out of Oxford Junction, Iowa in southeastern Jones County. The previous hotel was opened in 1889 in an existing building was re-purposed as a hotel. It was destroyed in a fire on February 7, 1893, that also took several other wooden structures nearby. Work on this building began immediately and it opened for business in September of the same year. The Lincoln Highway passed through Wheatland to the north of the railroad tracks in 1915, and the City Hotel was not along its route. As automobiles began to replace train travel the City Hotel's business began to decline. It closed in the late 1920s or early 1930s. After sitting empty for a few years, the Seifert family opened a tavern on the main floor in 1937, and lived in a part of the upstairs. Emil Koch, who owned the tavern across the street, bought the building two years later. It sat empty from 1939 to 1951. The interior of the building was remodeled in 1951 and used as a feed mill until September 1980. From 1980 to 1995 it was used as a warehouse.

== Architecture ==
The City Hotel is a two-story, 60-by-40-foot (18 by 12 m), rectangular building. The frame structure with an exterior composed of red and yellow brick veneer sits on a yellow, rock-face limestone foundation. The south side of the building faced a small rail yard, no longer extant. However, the main line of what is now the Union Pacific Railroad still passes to the south, but trains no longer stop in Wheatland. To the north are buildings that sit close to this structure. The yellow brickwork is the primary decorative element on the building. Both gables feature geometric shapes in that suggest "wings" and radiate from a circular window encircled in yellow brick. It is also used for corbels and the string course at the roof.
