= City Hotel (Marthaville, Louisiana) =

- U.S. National Register of Historic Places
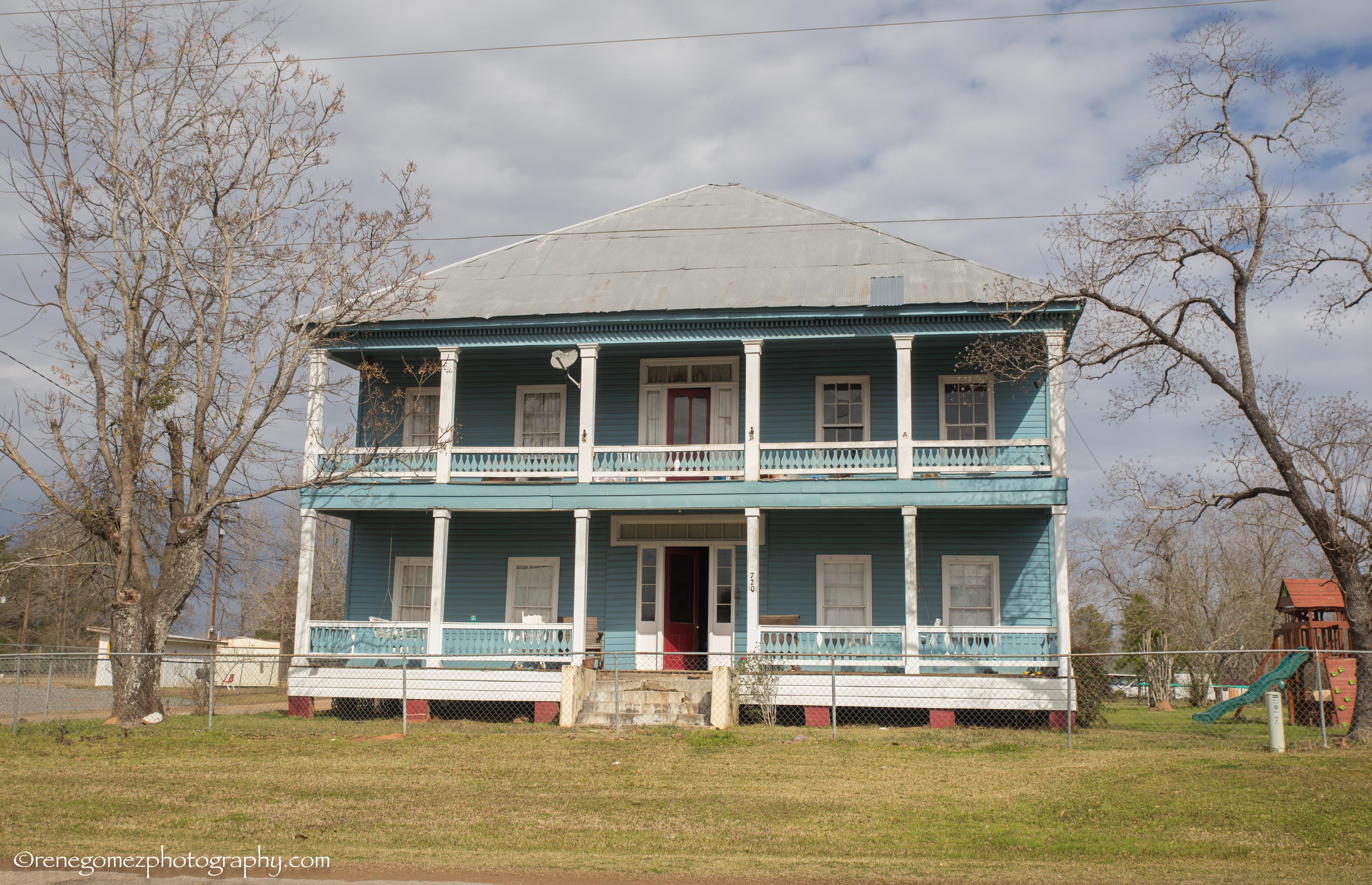

- Location within Louisiana Location within the United States
- Location: Jct. of LA 120 and Rains Ave., Marthaville, Louisiana
- Coordinates: 31°44′21″N 93°23′43″W
- Area: less than one acre
- NRHP reference No.: 93000317
- Added to NRHP: April 22, 1993

City Hotel in Marthaville, Louisiana, also known as Hotel Darden, was listed on the National Register of Historic Places in 1993. It was built c.1881 upon arrival of the Texas and Pacific Railroad, which stopped at a depot across the street from the hotel. It was built by John Jackson Rains, an early settler who is considered to be the founder of Marthaville.

The hotel is stylistically simple, but has a full gallery (porch) on both of its two stories. It has a hipped roof.
