= Ames Creek Bridge =

- U.S. National Register of Historic Places
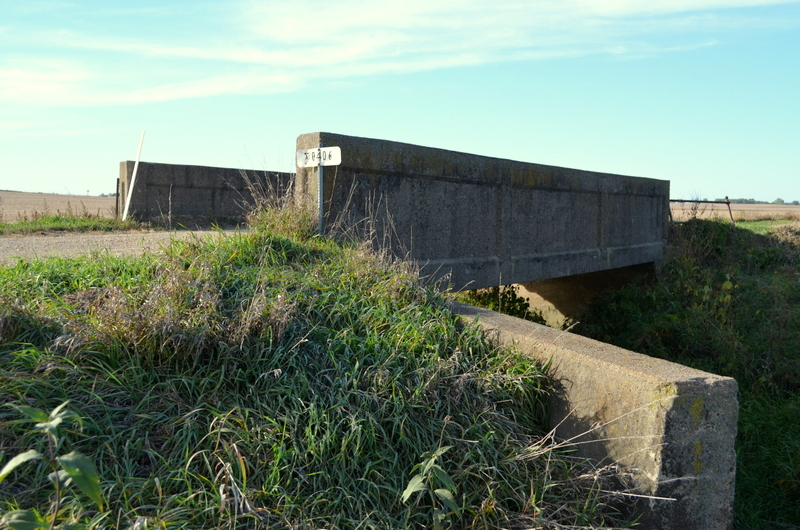

- Location within Iowa Location within the United States
- Location: 300th St. over Ames Creek; DeWitt, Iowa
- Coordinates: 41°51′01″N 90°30′36″W
- Built: 1912
- Architect: Clinton County Engineer
- Architectural style: concrete through girder bridge
- MPS: Highway Bridges of Iowa MPS
- NRHP reference No.: 98000802
- Added to NRHP: March 19, 1981

The Ames Creek Bridge is a historic structure located northeast of DeWitt, Iowa, United States in rural Clinton County. It is an early example of concrete bridge design prior to the codification of standards by the state highway commission. The bridge was listed on the National Register of Historic Places in 1981.

== Description ==
The bridge was designed by the Clinton County Engineer. The Clinton County Board of Supervisors contracted with Charlotte, Iowa contractor J.R. Kane in 1912 to build the bridge. The structure was completed that same year for $2,154. The poured-in-place concrete through girder bridge measures 37 feet (11 m) long and is 16 feet (5 m) wide. There is a minimal amount of ornamentation on the structure. It is composed of 11,000 pounds (4,990 kg) of reinforcing steel and 157 cubic yards of concrete. The bridge's concrete abutments and wing walls required almost 125 cubic yards of excavation. It was built a year before the Iowa State Highway Commission began developing standard bridge plans.
