= 1932 Iowa Senate election =

- November 8, 1932

30 out of 50 seats in the Iowa Senate 26 seats needed for a majority
	Majority party	Minority party
Party	Democratic	Republican
Last election	6	44
Seats after	25 (Note: As Lieutenant Governor of Iowa, Democrat Nelson G. Kraschel presided over the evenly-divided Iowa Senate following the 1932 general election.)	25
Seat change	▲19 (Note: Senator Frank Iradelle Coykendall of district 7 switched parties from Republican to Democratic, adding an additional seat to the Democratic caucus starting in 1933.)	▼19
- Results; Democratic gain Democratic hold Republican hold

The 1932 Iowa Senate elections took place as part of the biennial 1932 United States elections. Iowa voters elected state senators in 30 of the Iowa Senate's 50 districts. State senators serve four-year terms in Iowa.

A statewide map of the 50 state senate districts in the 1932 elections is provided by the Iowa General Assembly here.

The primary election on June 6, 1932, determined which candidates appeared on the November 8, 1932 general election ballot.

Following the previous election, Republicans had control of the Iowa Senate with 44 seats to Democrats' 6 seats, so to flip control of the chamber, the Democrats needed to net 20 Senate seats in these elections.

The Democrats gained control of the Senate following the 1932 general election, with the balance of power shifting to Republicans and Democrats having 25 seats each (a net gain of 19 seats for Democrats). Lieutenant Governor of Iowa Nelson G. Kraschel was a Democrat and presided over the evenly-divided Iowa Senate following the election.

By winning her election in the 23rd senatorial district during these elections, Carolyn Campbell Pendray became the first woman elected to the Iowa Senate. Previously, she had been the first woman elected to the Iowa House of Representatives as well. (Note: Senator Carolyn Campbell Pendray was the first woman elected to the Iowa General Assembly.)

== Results ==
- Note: 19 districts with "holdover" Senators not up for re-election are not listed on this table. (Note: Note that district 7 did not have an election and Senator Coykendall was a holdover Senator; however, he switched parties starting in 1933.)

Senate District	Incumbent	Party	Elected Senator	Party
2nd	Aaron Vale Blackford	Rep	John N. Calhoun	Rep
3rd	Herbert B. Carroll	Rep	John K. Valentine	Dem
4th	John W. Kent	Rep	John Henry Judd	Dem
5th	Frank D. Ickis	Rep	Frank M. Stevens	Dem
6th	Arthur Gray Leonard	Rep	Claude Stanley	Rep
7th (Note: The seventh district did not hold an election in 1932. However, Senator Coykendall switched parties from Republican to Democrat.)	Frank Iradelle Coykendall	Rep	Frank Iradelle Coykenall	Dem
8th	William C. Cochrane	Rep	Homer Hush	Rep
11th	Wesley C. Lowe	Rep	William S. Beardsley	Rep
14th	Forrester Call Stanley	Rep	Louis Tuttle Shangle	Dem
15th	William Alexander Clark	Rep	Carl F. Aschenbrenner	Dem
16th	John N. Langfitt	Rep	Ora E. Husted	Rep
17th	Frank Bissell	Rep	George M. Hopkins	Rep
19th	William Samuel Baird	Rep	Morris W. Moore	Dem
23rd	George W. Tabor	Dem	Carolyn Campbell Pendray	Dem
24th	Charles Longley Rigby	Rep	Henry Delbert Miller	Dem
25th	George Marchant Clearman	Rep	Paul W. Schmidt	Dem
26th	Charles Francis Clark	Rep	Frank C. Byers	Rep
27th	C. E. Anderson	Rep	Paul H. Anderson	Dem
28th	William E. McLeland	Rep	Chris Reese	Dem
31st	Lant H. Doran	Rep	Fred William Nelson	Rep
32nd	Bertel M. Stoddard	Rep	Vincent F. Harrington	Dem
33rd	Chester G. Cole	Rep	Warren F. Miller	Dem
36th	Charles Augustus Benson	Rep	Martin X. Geske	Dem
39th	George W. Christophel	Rep	Louis H. Meyer	Dem
40th	John Henry Hager	Rep	Thomas William Mullaney	Dem
41st	Otto E. Gunderson	Rep	Leo Elthon	Rep
43rd	Edward W. Clark	Rep	William C. McArthur	Dem
46th	Lew MacDonald (Note: His surname is listed as both "McDonald" and "MacDonald" on various documents on the Iowa General Assembly website.)	Rep	Mike G. Fisch	Dem
47th	George William Patterson	Rep	George William Patterson	Rep
48th	Lewis Thomas Quirk	Rep	I. G. Chrystal	Dem
49th	Tollef Edward Moen (Note: Senator Moen switched parties and ran for re-election as a Democrat. He was defeated.)	Rep	Garritt E. Roelofs	Rep

== Detailed Results ==
- NOTE: The 20 districts that did not hold elections in 1932 are not listed here.
- Note: If a district does not list a primary, then that district did not have a competitive primary (i.e., there may have only been one candidate file for that district).

=== District 2 ===
Iowa Senate, District 2 Republican Primary Election, 1932
Party	Candidate	Votes	%
Republican	John N. Calhoun	2,592	43.2
Republican	Carroll	2,021	33.6
Republican	Aaron Vale Blackford (incumbent)	1,393	23.2
Total votes		6,006	100.0

Iowa Senate, District 2 General Election, 1932
Party	Candidate	Votes	%
Republican	John N. Calhoun	6,073	52.0
Democratic	J. S. Foxgrave	5,597	48.0
Total votes		11,670	100.0
Republican hold			

=== District 3 ===
Iowa Senate, District 3 Democratic Primary Election, 1932
Party	Candidate	Votes	%
Democratic	John K. Valentine	1,606	49.7
Democratic	Hornaday	818	25.3
Democratic	Killian	808	25.0
Total votes		3,232	100.0

Iowa Senate, District 3 General Election, 1932
Party	Candidate	Votes	%
Democratic	John K. Valentine	8,598	61.5
Republican	George L. Bovard	5,389	38.5
Total votes		13,987	100.0
Democratic gain from Republican			

=== District 4 ===
Iowa Senate, District 4 General Election, 1932
Party	Candidate	Votes	%
Democratic	John H. Judd	6,115	53.3
Republican	Tedford W. Miles	5,352	46.7
Total votes		11,467	100.0
Democratic gain from Republican			

=== District 5 ===
Iowa Senate, District 5 Republican Primary Election, 1932
Party	Candidate	Votes	%
Republican	Selby C. Stanley	5,742	75.0
Republican	Eiker	1,910	25.0
Total votes		7,652	100.0

Iowa Senate, District 5 Democratic Primary Election, 1932
Party	Candidate	Votes	%
Democratic	Frank M. Stevens	936	39.3
Democratic	Springer	809	33.9
Democratic	Eddy	639	26.8
Total votes		2,384	100.0

Iowa Senate, District 5 General Election, 1932
Party	Candidate	Votes	%
Democratic	Frank M. Stevens	7,918	51.7
Republican	Selby C. Stanley	7,395	48.3
Total votes		15,313	100.0
Democratic gain from Republican			

=== District 6 ===
Iowa Senate, District 6 Republican Primary Election, 1932
Party	Candidate	Votes	%
Republican	Claude M. Stanley	3,005	51.9
Republican	Arthur Gray Leonard (incumbent)	2,782	48.1
Total votes		5,787	100.0

Iowa Senate, District 6 General Election, 1932
Party	Candidate	Votes	%
Republican	Claude M. Stanley	4,972	55.2
Democratic	C. A. Haynes	4,034	44.8
Total votes		9,006	100.0
Republican hold			

=== District 8 ===
Iowa Senate, District 8 Republican Primary Election, 1932
Party	Candidate	Votes	%
Republican	Homer Hush	2,912	51.3
Republican	Wilson	2,054	36.1
Republican	Williams	716	12.6
Total votes		5,682	100.0

Iowa Senate, District 8 General Election, 1932
Party	Candidate	Votes	%
Republican	Homer Hush	6,635	52.8
Democratic	Gordon Steiner	5,941	47.2
Total votes		12,576	100.0
Republican hold			

=== District 11 ===
Iowa Senate, District 11 Republican Primary Election, 1932
Party	Candidate	Votes	%
Republican	William S. Beardsley	3,405	60.5
Republican	Moffett	2,224	39.5
Total votes		5,629	100.0

Iowa Senate, District 11 General Election, 1932
Party	Candidate	Votes	%
Republican	William S. Beardsley	5,991	56.6
Democratic	Clifford P. Shane	4,588	43.4
Total votes		10,579	100.0
Republican hold			

=== District 14 ===
Iowa Senate, District 14 Republican Primary Election, 1932
Party	Candidate	Votes	%
Republican	Warren A. Caldwell	1,590	50.7
Republican	McClune	1,547	49.3
Total votes		3,137	100.0

Iowa Senate, District 14 Democratic Primary Election, 1932
Party	Candidate	Votes	%
Democratic	L. T. Shangle	706	60.7
Democratic	Gilderbloom	457	39.3
Total votes		1,163	100.0

Iowa Senate, District 14 General Election, 1932
Party	Candidate	Votes	%
Democratic	L. T. Shangle	4,463	50.2
Republican	Warren A. Caldwell	4,435	49.8
Total votes		8,898	100.0
Democratic gain from Republican			

=== District 15 ===
Iowa Senate, District 15 Democratic Primary Election, 1932
Party	Candidate	Votes	%
Democratic	Carl Aschenbrenner	1,614	52.7
Democratic	Godfrey	1,449	47.3
Total votes		3,063	100.0

Iowa Senate, District 15 General Election, 1932
Party	Candidate	Votes	%
Democratic	Carl Aschenbrenner	8,480	52.7
Republican	Charles Miller	7,609	47.3
Total votes		16,089	100.0
Democratic gain from Republican			

=== District 16 ===
Iowa Senate, District 16 Republican Primary Election, 1932
Party	Candidate	Votes	%
Republican	Ora E. Husted	2,584	41.1
Republican	Percival	2,146	34.2
Republican	Robbins	1,551	24.7
Total votes		6,281	100.0

Iowa Senate, District 16 General Election, 1932
Party	Candidate	Votes	%
Republican	Ora E. Husted	4,892	51.1
Democratic	S. A. Hays	4,676	48.9
Total votes		9,568	100.0
Republican hold			

=== District 17 ===
Iowa Senate, District 17 Republican Primary Election, 1932
Party	Candidate	Votes	%
Republican	George M. Hopkins	4,240	40.5
Republican	Mills	3,526	33.6
Republican	Frank Bissell (incumbent)	2,709	25.9
Total votes		10,475	100.0

Iowa Senate, District 17 General Election, 1932
Party	Candidate	Votes	%
Republican	George M. Hopkins	9,388	51.7
Democratic	George J. Dugan	8,778	48.3
Total votes		18,166	100.0
Republican hold			

=== District 19 ===
Iowa Senate, District 19 General Election, 1932
Party	Candidate	Votes	%
Democratic	Morris Moore	15,620	61.6
Republican	W. S. Baird (incumbent)	9,727	38.4
Total votes		25,347	100.0
Democratic gain from Republican			

=== District 23 ===
Iowa Senate, District 23 Republican Primary Election, 1932
Party	Candidate	Votes	%
Republican	Charles S. Brown(e) (Note: His name is written as both "Browne" and "Brown" in the primary and general elections, respectively.)	809	52.0
Republican	Cole	748	48.0
Total votes		1,557	100.0

Iowa Senate, District 23 Democratic Primary Election, 1932
Party	Candidate	Votes	%
Democratic	Carolyn Campbell Pendray	1,175	59.4
Democratic	George W. Tabor (incumbent)	803	40.6
Total votes		1,978	100.0

Iowa Senate, District 23 General Election, 1932
Party	Candidate	Votes	%
Democratic	Carolyn C. Pendray	4,304	60.1
Republican	Charles S. Brown(e)	2,858	39.9
Total votes		7,162	100.0
Democratic hold			

=== District 24 ===
Iowa Senate, District 24 Republican Primary Election, 1932
Party	Candidate	Votes	%
Republican	E. A. Grimwood	2,037	40.6
Republican	Bodenhofer	1,527	30.5
Republican	Van Buren	1,450	28.9
Total votes		5,014	100.0

Iowa Senate, District 24 General Election, 1932
Party	Candidate	Votes	%
Democratic	H. D. Miller	8,718	57.5
Republican	E. A. Grimwood	6,455	42.5
Total votes		15,173	100.0
Democratic gain from Republican			

=== District 25 ===
Iowa Senate, District 25 Republican Primary Election, 1932
Party	Candidate	Votes	%
Republican	Frederick C. Schadt	1,976	46.3
Republican	Kueneman	1,476	34.6
Republican	McCulloch	812	19.1
Total votes		4,264	100.0

Iowa Senate, District 25 General Election, 1932
Party	Candidate	Votes	%
Democratic	Paul W. Schmidt	10,352	52.6
Republican	Frederick C. Schadt	9,322	47.4
Total votes		19,674	100.0
Democratic gain from Republican			

=== District 26 ===
Iowa Senate, District 26 Republican Primary Election, 1932
Party	Candidate	Votes	%
Republican	Frank C. Byers	6,700	72.2
Republican	Hall	2,583	27.8
Total votes		9,283	100.0

Iowa Senate, District 26 General Election, 1932
Party	Candidate	Votes	%
Republican	Frank C. Byers	19,403	55.1
Democratic	William Tehel	15,800	44.9
Total votes		35,203	100.0
Republican hold			

=== District 27 ===
Iowa Senate, District 27 General Election, 1932
Party	Candidate	Votes	%
Democratic	Paul H. Anderson	10,748	57.9
Republican	Marion R. McCaulley	7,829	42.1
Total votes		18,577	100.0
Democratic gain from Republican			

=== District 28 ===
Iowa Senate, District 28 Republican Primary Election, 1932
Party	Candidate	Votes	%
Republican	W. J. Lynch (Note: Despite getting the most votes in the Republican Primary, Lynch ran in the general election as an Independent.)	1,626	27.8
Republican	Roy P. Scott (Note: Despite getting the second most votes in the Republican Primary, Scott ran in the general election as an Independent.)	1,536	26.4
Republican	Roy L. Pell (Note: Despite coming in third in the Republican Primary, Pell would run as the party's nominee in the general election as the first and second placed finishers in the Republican Primary both ran in the general as Independents.)	1,159	19.9
Republican	Rylander	855	14.7
Republican	William E. McLeland (incumbent)	650	11.2
Total votes		5,826	100.0

Iowa Senate, District 28 General Election, 1932
Party	Candidate	Votes	%
Democratic	Chris Reese	4,658	37.0
Independent	W. J. Lynch	3,362	26.7
Republican	Roy L. Pell	2,799	22.3
Independent	Roy P. Scott	1,758	14.0
Total votes		12,577	100.0
Democratic gain from Republican			

=== District 31 ===
Iowa Senate, District 31 Republican Primary Election, 1932
Party	Candidate	Votes	%
Republican	Fred W. Nelson	4,165	40.1
Republican	Lynch	3,965	38.2
Republican	Welty	2,257	21.7
Total votes		10,387	100.0

Iowa Senate, District 31 Democratic Primary Election, 1932
Party	Candidate	Votes	%
Democratic	H. F. McLaughlin	281	55.8
Democratic	Loyd	223	44.2
Total votes		504	100.0

Iowa Senate, District 31 General Election, 1932
Party	Candidate	Votes	%
Republican	Fred W. Nelson	10,919	61.6
Democratic	H. F. McLaughlin	6,799	38.4
Total votes		17,718	100.0
Republican hold			

=== District 32 ===
Iowa Senate, District 32 Republican Primary Election, 1932
Party	Candidate	Votes	%
Republican	C. N. Jepson	6,264	59.5
Republican	Bergeson	4,268	40.5
Total votes		10,532	100.0

Iowa Senate, District 32 Democratic Primary Election, 1932
Party	Candidate	Votes	%
Democratic	Vincent F. Harrington	3,432	61.9
Democratic	Waller	2,112	38.1
Total votes		5,544	100.0

Iowa Senate, District 32 General Election, 1932
Party	Candidate	Votes	%
Democratic	Vincent F. Harrington	20,939	59.3
Republican	C. N. Jepson	14,349	40.7
Total votes		35,288	100.0
Democratic gain from Republican			

=== District 33 ===
Iowa Senate, District 33 Republican Primary Election, 1932
Party	Candidate	Votes	%
Republican	George F. Slemmons	3,667	53.5
Republican	Smith	3,186	46.5
Total votes		6,853	100.0

Iowa Senate, District 33 General Election, 1932
Party	Candidate	Votes	%
Democratic	Warren F. Miller	8,581	51.2
Republican	George F. Slemmons	8,185	48.8
Total votes		16,766	100.0
Democratic gain from Republican			

=== District 36 ===
Iowa Senate, District 36 General Election, 1932
Party	Candidate	Votes	%
Democratic	M. X. Geske	6,716	62.7
Republican	C. J. Orr	3,995	37.3
Total votes		10,711	100.0
Democratic gain from Republican			

=== District 39 ===
Iowa Senate, District 39 Republican Primary Election, 1932
Party	Candidate	Votes	%
Republican	John M. Ramsey	2,349	37.3
Republican	Young	1,502	23.9
Republican	Eckles	1,441	22.9
Republican	Stine	1,004	15.9
Total votes		6,296	100.0

Iowa Senate, District 39 Democratic Primary Election, 1932
Party	Candidate	Votes	%
Democratic	L. H. Meyer	1,529	68.1
Democratic	Spain	716	31.9
Total votes		2,245	100.0

Iowa Senate, District 39 General Election, 1932
Party	Candidate	Votes	%
Democratic	L. H. Meyer	7,374	53.9
Republican	John M. Ramsey	6,297	46.1
Total votes		13,671	100.0
Democratic gain from Republican			

=== District 40 ===
Iowa Senate, District 40 Republican Primary Election, 1932
Party	Candidate	Votes	%
Republican	J. H. Hager (incumbent)	3,558	41.8
Republican	Marston	2,765	32.5
Republican	Hendrickson	2,197	25.7
Total votes		8,520	100.0

Iowa Senate, District 40 General Election, 1932
Party	Candidate	Votes	%
Democratic	T. W. Mullaney	10,589	54.7
Republican	J. H. Hager (incumbent)	8,775	45.3
Total votes		19,364	100.0
Democratic gain from Republican			

=== District 41 ===
Iowa Senate, District 41 Republican Primary Election, 1932
Party	Candidate	Votes	%
Republican	Leo Elthon	4,180	36.7
Republican	Torgenson	3,717	32.6
Republican	Brown	3,501	30.7
Total votes		11,398	100.0

Iowa Senate, District 41 General Election, 1932
Party	Candidate	Votes	%
Republican	Leo H. Elthon	6,255	44.0
Democratic	L. P. Miller	5,217	36.7
Independent	J. P. Hansen	2,739	19.3
Total votes		14,211	100.0
Republican hold			

=== District 43 ===
Iowa Senate, District 43 General Election, 1932
Party	Candidate	Votes	%
Democratic	William McArthur	14,556	56.2
Republican	A. L. Rule	11,342	43.8
Total votes		25,898	100.0
Democratic gain from Republican			

=== District 46 ===
Iowa Senate, District 46 General Election, 1932
Party	Candidate	Votes	%
Democratic	Mike G. Fisch	12,763	60.1
Republican	Lew MacDonald (incumbent)	8,484	39.9
Total votes		21,247	100.0
Democratic gain from Republican			

=== District 47 ===
Iowa Senate, District 47 General Election, 1932
Party	Candidate	Votes	%
Republican	G. W. Patterson (incumbent)	13,827	50.2
Democratic	B. F. McFarland	13,744	49.8
Total votes		27,571	100.0
Republican hold			

=== District 48 ===
Iowa Senate, District 48 Republican Primary Election, 1932
Party	Candidate	Votes	%
Republican	Robert Elmer Long	4,617	49.1
Republican	Wood	3,639	38.8
Republican	Bowman	1,134	12.1
Total votes		9,390	100.0

Iowa Senate, District 48 Democratic Primary Election, 1932
Party	Candidate	Votes	%
Democratic	I. G. Chrystal	1,898	64.8
Democratic	Hanna	1,029	35.2
Total votes		2,927	100.0

Iowa Senate, District 48 General Election, 1932
Party	Candidate	Votes	%
Democratic	I. G. Chrystal	11,527	60.2
Republican	Robert Elmer Long	7,617	39.8
Total votes		19,144	100.0
Democratic gain from Republican			

=== District 49 ===
Iowa Senate, District 49 Republican Primary Election, 1932
Party	Candidate	Votes	%
Republican	Garritt E. Roelofs	5,633	42.3
Republican	T. E. Moen (incumbent)	4,700	35.4
Republican	Meltzer	2,969	22.3
Total votes		13,302	100.0

Iowa Senate, District 49 General Election, 1932
Party	Candidate	Votes	%
Republican	Garritt E. Roelofs	12,376	50.2
Democratic	T. E. Moen (incumbent)	12,299	49.8
Total votes		24,675	100.0
Republican hold			

== See also ==
- United States elections, 1932
- United States House of Representatives elections in Iowa, 1932
- Elections in Iowa
