= 1928 Iowa Senate election =

- November 6, 1928

31 out of 50 seats in the Iowa Senate 26 seats needed for a majority
	Majority party	Minority party
Party	Republican	Democratic
Last election	49	1
Seats before	48 (Note: In a special election in the 20th district, Republican Samuel Franklin Wilson was replaced by Democrat Ralph U. Thompson, which flipped the seat to the Democrats.)	2
Seats after	48	2
Seat change	Steady	Steady
- Results; Democratic gain Republican gain Republican hold

The 1928 Iowa Senate elections took place as part of the biennial 1928 United States elections. Iowa voters elected state senators in 31 of the senate's 50 districts. State senators serve four-year terms in the Iowa Senate.

A statewide map of the 50 state Senate districts in the 1928 elections is provided by the Iowa General Assembly here.

The primary election on June 4, 1928, determined which candidates appeared on the November 6, 1928 general election ballot.

Following the previous election, Republicans had control of the Iowa Senate with 49 seats to Democrats' 1 seat. A special election in district 20 in 1927 saw the seat flip from Republican to Democratic control.

To claim control of the chamber from Republicans, the Democrats needed to net 24 Senate seats.

Republicans maintained control of the Iowa State Senate following the 1928 general election with the balance of power remaining unchanged with Republicans holding 48 seats and Democrats having 2 seats.

== Summary of Results ==
- Note: 19 districts with holdover Senators not up for re-election are not listed on this table.

Senate District	Incumbent	Party	Elected Senator	Party
2nd	Charles J. Fulton	Rep	Aaron Vale Blackford	Rep
3rd	Lloyd Ellis	Dem	Herbert B. Carroll	Rep
4th	Allen Gilbert Dotts	Rep	John W. Kent	Rep
5th	Henry Guy Roberts	Rep	Frank D. Ickis	Rep
6th	Samuel Edwin Fackler	Rep	Arthur Gray Leonard	Rep
8th	William C. Cochrane	Rep	William C. Cochrane	Rep
11th	Charles B. Kern	Rep	Wesley C. Lowe	Rep
14th	Forrester Call Stanley	Rep	Forrester Call Stanley	Rep
15th	William Alexander Clark	Rep	William Alexander Clark	Rep
16th	John N. Langfitt	Rep	John N. Langfitt	Rep
17th	Redfield Clipper Mills	Rep	Frank Bissell	Rep
19th	William Samuel Baird	Rep	William Samuel Baird	Rep
23rd	Charles Steere Browne	Rep	George W. Tabor	Dem
24th	Charles Longley Rigby	Rep	Charles Longley Rigby	Rep
25th	George Marchant Clearman	Rep	George Marchant Clearman	Rep
26th	Charles Francis Clark	Rep	Charles Francis Clark	Rep
27th	Emmett E. Cavanaugh	Rep	C. E. Anderson	Rep
28th	William E. McLeland	Rep	William E. McLeland	Rep
31st	Lars Johan Skromme	Rep	Lant H. Doran	Rep
32nd	Bertel M. Stoddard	Rep	Bertel M. Stoddard	Rep
33rd	George F. Slemmons	Rep	Chester G. Cole	Rep
34th (Note: The 34th district held a special election to fill a vacancy.)	Andrew Jackson Shinn	Rep	Oliver P. Bennett	Rep
36th	Charles Augustus Benson	Rep	Charles Augustus Benson	Rep
38th (Note: The 38th district held a special election to fill a vacancy.)	Arch Wallace McFarlane	Rep	Charles Theodore Rogers	Rep
39th	John M. Ramsey	Rep	George W. Christophel	Rep
40th	George S. Hartman	Rep	John Henry Hager	Rep
41st	Otto E. Gunderson	Rep	Otto E. Gunderson	Rep
43rd	Charles Frederic Johnston	Rep	Edward W. Clark	Rep
46th	Ed Hoyt Campbell	Rep	Lew MacDonald (Note: His surname is listed as both "McDonald" and "MacDonald" on various documents on the Iowa General Assembly website.)	Rep
47th	William John Breakenridge	Rep	George William Patterson	Rep
49th	Tollef Edward Moen	Rep	Tollef Edward Moen	Rep

== Detailed Results ==
- NOTE: The 19 districts that did not hold elections in 1928 are not listed here.
- Note: If a district does not list a primary, then that district did not have a competitive primary (i.e., there may have only been one candidate file for that district).

=== District 2 ===
Iowa Senate, District 2 Republican Primary Election, 1928
Party	Candidate	Votes	%
Republican	Aaron Vale Blackford	3,397	53.91%
Republican	Charles J. Fulton (incumbent)	2,904	46.09%
Total votes		6,301	100.00%

Iowa Senate, District 2 General Election, 1928
Party	Candidate	Votes	%
Republican	A. V. Blackford	7,798	66.03%
Democratic	J. S. Forgraves	4,012	33.97%
Total votes		11,810	100.00%
Republican hold			

=== District 3 ===
Iowa Senate, District 3 Republican Primary Election, 1928
Party	Candidate	Votes	%
Republican	Herbert B. Carroll	3,210	62.08%
Republican	Swan	1,961	37.92%
Total votes		5,171	100.00%

Iowa Senate, District 3 Democratic Primary Election, 1928
Party	Candidate	Votes	%
Democratic	Lloyd Ellis (incumbent)	1,877	66.37%
Democratic	Rice	951	33.63%
Total votes		2,828	100.00%

Iowa Senate, District 3 General Election, 1928
Party	Candidate	Votes	%
Republican	H. B. Carroll	8,340	55.67%
Democratic	Lloyd Ellis (incumbent)	6,641	44.33%
Total votes		14,981	100.00%
Republican gain from Democratic			

=== District 4 ===
Iowa Senate, District 4 Republican Primary Election, 1928
Party	Candidate	Votes	%
Republican	John W. Kent	2,545	54.05%
Republican	Wennerstrum	2,164	45.95%
Total votes		4,709	100.00%

Iowa Senate, District 4 General Election, 1928
Party	Candidate	Votes	%
Republican	John W. Kent	6,869	58.70%
Democratic	Joseph E. Doze	4,833	41.30%
Total votes		11,702	100.00%
Republican hold			

=== District 5 ===
Iowa Senate, District 5 Republican Primary Election, 1928
Party	Candidate	Votes	%
Republican	Frank D. Ickis	3,846	53.25%
Republican	Parsons	3,376	46.75%
Total votes		7,222	100.00%

Iowa Senate, District 5 General Election, 1928
Party	Candidate	Votes	%
Republican	F. D. Ickis	12,034	100.00%
Total votes		12,034	100.00%
Republican hold			

=== District 6 ===
Iowa Senate, District 6 General Election, 1928
Party	Candidate	Votes	%
Republican	Arthur Leonard	5,857	54.18%
Democratic	H. M. Buchanan	4,953	45.82%
Total votes		10,810	100.00%
Republican hold			

=== District 8 ===
Iowa Senate, District 8 Republican Primary Election, 1928
Party	Candidate	Votes	%
Republican	William Cochrane (incumbent)	2,864	54.26%
Republican	C. C. Anderson	1,496	28.34%
Republican	C. L. Anderson	918	17.39%
Total votes		5,278	100.00%

Iowa Senate, District 8 General Election, 1928
Party	Candidate	Votes	%
Republican	William Cochrane (incumbent)	7,894	64.44%
Democratic	Marion Roberts	4,357	35.56%
Total votes		12,251	100.00%
Republican hold			

=== District 11 ===
Iowa Senate, District 11 Republican Primary Election, 1928
Party	Candidate	Votes	%
Republican	Wesley C. Lowe	2,061	55.88%
Republican	Harrison	1,627	44.12%
Total votes		3,688	100.00%

Iowa Senate, District 11 General Election, 1928
Party	Candidate	Votes	%
Republican	Wesley C. Lowe	7,975	100.00%
Total votes		7,975	100.00%
Republican hold			

=== District 14 ===
Iowa Senate, District 14 General Election, 1928
Party	Candidate	Votes	%
Republican	F. C. Stanley (incumbent)	5,679	60.52%
Democratic	M. E. Gilderbloom	3,705	39.48%
Total votes		9,384	100.00%
Republican hold			

=== District 15 ===
Iowa Senate, District 15 Republican Primary Election, 1928
Party	Candidate	Votes	%
Republican	W. A. Clark (incumbent)	4,166	61.38%
Republican	Aldrich	2,621	38.62%
Total votes		6,787	100.00%

Iowa Senate, District 15 General Election, 1928
Party	Candidate	Votes	%
Republican	W. A. Clark (incumbent)	8,678	53.60%
Democratic	John F. Clarkson	7,512	46.40%
Total votes		16,190	100.00%
Republican hold			

=== District 16 ===
Iowa Senate, District 16 General Election, 1928
Party	Candidate	Votes	%
Republican	John W. Langfitt (incumbent)	6,406	64.09%
Democratic	Fred O. Welch	3,590	35.91%
Total votes		9,996	100.00%
Republican hold			

=== District 17 ===
Iowa Senate, District 17 Republican Primary Election, 1928
Party	Candidate	Votes	%
Republican	Frank Bissell	4,514	56.48%
Republican	Redfield Clipper Mills (incumbent)	3,478	43.51%
Total votes		7,992	100.00%

Iowa Senate, District 17 General Election, 1928
Party	Candidate	Votes	%
Republican	Frank Bissell	14,344	100.00%
Total votes		14,344	100.00%
Republican hold			

=== District 19 ===
Iowa Senate, District 19 General Election, 1928
Party	Candidate	Votes	%
Republican	W. S. Baird (incumbent)	14,271	60.77%
Democratic	Francis B. Taylor	9,214	39.23%
Total votes		23,485	100.00%
Republican hold			

=== District 23 ===
Iowa Senate, District 23 Republican Primary Election, 1928
Party	Candidate	Votes	%
Republican	Charles Steere Browne (incumbent)	971	53.41%
Republican	Millhaem	847	46.59%
Total votes		1,818	100.00%

Iowa Senate, District 23 General Election, 1928
Party	Candidate	Votes	%
Democratic	George W. Tabor	4,158	54.66%
Republican	Charles Steere Browne (incumbent)	3,449	45.34%
Total votes		7,607	100.00%
Democratic gain from Republican			

=== District 24 ===
Iowa Senate, District 24 General Election, 1928
Party	Candidate	Votes	%
Republican	C. L. Rigby (incumbent)	9,177	63.87%
Democratic	John Thomsen	4,896	34.07%
Independent	John W. Lenker	296	2.06%
Total votes		14,369	100.00%
Republican hold			

=== District 25 ===
Iowa Senate, District 25 General Election, 1928
Party	Candidate	Votes	%
Republican	George M. Clearman (incumbent)	10,359	53.49%
Democratic	J. P. Gallagher	9,006	46.51%
Total votes		19,365	100.00%
Republican hold			

=== District 26 ===
Iowa Senate, District 26 Republican Primary Election, 1928
Party	Candidate	Votes	%
Republican	C. F. Clark (incumbent)	5,744	57.01%
Republican	Stepanek	4,332	42.99%
Total votes		10,076	100.00%

Iowa Senate, District 26 General Election, 1928
Party	Candidate	Votes	%
Republican	C. F. Clark (incumbent)	24,604	68.50%
Democratic	Charles D. Huston	11,314	31.50%
Total votes		35,918	100.00%
Republican hold			

=== District 27 ===
Iowa Senate, District 27 Republican Primary Election, 1928
Party	Candidate	Votes	%
Republican	C. E. Anderson	3,030	39.92%
Republican	Emmett E. Cavanaugh (incumbent)	2,861	37.69%
Republican	Kime	1,700	22.39%
Total votes		7,591	100.00%

Iowa Senate, District 27 General Election, 1928
Party	Candidate	Votes	%
Republican	C. E. Anderson	11,363	74.15%
Independent	John W. Kime	3,961	25.85%
Total votes		15,324	100.00%
Republican hold			

=== District 28 ===
Iowa Senate, District 28 Republican Primary Election, 1928
Party	Candidate	Votes	%
Republican	William E. McLeland (incumbent)	1,454	29.89%
Republican	Conaway	1,237	25.43%
Republican	Lounsberry	1,097	22.55%
Republican	Maxfield	1,077	22.14%
Total votes		4,865	100.00%

Iowa Senate, District 28 General Election, 1928
Party	Candidate	Votes	%
Republican	William E. McLeland (incumbent)	8,266	100.00%
Total votes		8,266	100.00%
Republican hold			

=== District 31 ===
Iowa Senate, District 31 Republican Primary Election, 1928
Party	Candidate	Votes	%
Republican	L. H. Doran	5,230	54.86%
Republican	Lockard	2,494	26.16%
Republican	Criswell	1,809	18.98%
Total votes		9,533	100.00%

Iowa Senate, District 31 General Election, 1928
Party	Candidate	Votes	%
Republican	L. H. Doran	14,859	100.00%
Total votes		14,859	100.00%
Republican hold			

=== District 32 ===
Iowa Senate, District 32 Republican Primary Election, 1928
Party	Candidate	Votes	%
Republican	Bertel M. Stoddard (incumbent)	7,406	52.23%
Republican	Short	6,773	47.77%
Total votes		14,179	100.00%

Iowa Senate, District 32 General Election, 1928
Party	Candidate	Votes	%
Republican	Bertel M. Stoddard (incumbent)	20,322	94.17%
Independent	B. J. Bergeson	1,257	5.83%
Total votes		21,579	100.00%
Republican hold			

=== District 33 ===
Iowa Senate, District 33 General Election, 1928
Party	Candidate	Votes	%
Republican	C. G. Cole	10,550	66.16%
Democratic	Charles L. King	5,397	33.84%
Total votes		15,947	100.00%
Republican hold			

=== District 34 ===
Iowa Senate, District 34 General Election, 1928
Party	Candidate	Votes	%
Republican	O. P. Bennett	12,172	53.82%
Democratic	Levi McNeill	10,443	46.18%
Total votes		22,615	100.00%
Republican hold			

=== District 36 ===
Iowa Senate, District 36 General Election, 1928
Party	Candidate	Votes	%
Republican	C. A. Benson (incumbent)	6,705	100.00%
Total votes		6,705	100.00%
Republican hold			

=== District 38 ===
Iowa Senate, District 38 General Election, 1928
Party	Candidate	Votes	%
Republican	Charles T. Rogers	22,217	100.00%
Total votes		22,217	100.00%
Republican hold			

=== District 39 ===
Iowa Senate, District 39 Republican Primary Election, 1928
Party	Candidate	Votes	%
Republican	George Christophel	3,203	59.99%
Republican	John M. Ramsey (incumbent)	2,136	40.01%
Total votes		5,339	100.00%

Iowa Senate, District 39 General Election, 1928
Party	Candidate	Votes	%
Republican	George Christophel	8,261	66.46%
Democratic	Robert E. Kirk	4,169	33.54%
Total votes		12,430	100.00%
Republican hold			

=== District 40 ===
Iowa Senate, District 40 General Election, 1928
Party	Candidate	Votes	%
Republican	J. H. Hager	12,418	65.84%
Democratic	B. J. Dillon	6,443	34.16%
Total votes		18,861	100.00%
Republican hold			

=== District 41 ===
Iowa Senate, District 41 General Election, 1928
Party	Candidate	Votes	%
Republican	O. E. Gunderson (incumbent)	9,884	92.16%
Democratic	William H. Sheka	841	7.84%
Total votes		10,725	100.00%
Republican hold			

=== District 43 ===
Iowa Senate, District 43 Republican Primary Election, 1928
Party	Candidate	Votes	%
Republican	E. W. Clark	6,831	45.94%
Republican	Knutson	5,993	40.31%
Republican	Hall	2,044	13.75%
Total votes		14,868	100.00%

Iowa Senate, District 43 General Election, 1928
Party	Candidate	Votes	%
Republican	E. W. Clark	16,687	100.00%
Total votes		16,687	100.00%
Republican hold			

=== District 46 ===
Iowa Senate, District 46 Republican Primary Election, 1928
Party	Candidate	Votes	%
Republican	Lew MacDonald	4,116	48.76%
Republican	Held	3,574	42.34%
Republican	Wormley	752	8.91%
Total votes		8,442	100.00%

Iowa Senate, District 46 General Election, 1928
Party	Candidate	Votes	%
Republican	Lew MacDonald	12,012	100.00%
Total votes		12,012	100.00%
Republican hold			

=== District 47 ===
Iowa Senate, District 47 Republican Primary Election, 1928
Party	Candidate	Votes	%
Republican	George William Patterson	7,565	50.10%
Republican	William John Breakenridge (incumbent)	7,534	49.90%
Total votes		15,099	100.00%

Iowa Senate, District 47 General Election, 1928
Party	Candidate	Votes	%
Republican	G. W. Patterson	18,736	100.00%
Total votes		18,736	100.00%
Republican hold			

=== District 49 ===
Iowa Senate, District 49 General Election, 1928
Party	Candidate	Votes	%
Republican	T. E. Moen (incumbent)	16,335	100.00%
Total votes		16,335	100.00%
Republican hold			

== See also ==
- United States elections, 1928
- United States House of Representatives elections in Iowa, 1928
- Elections in Iowa
