= Senator Tabor (disambiguation) =

Horace Tabor (1830–1899) was a U.S. Senator from Colorado in 1883. Senator Tabor may also refer to:

- George Tabor (1862–1939), Iowa State Senate
- Howard Tabor (1893–1968), Iowa State Senate
