= D.H. Anderson Building =

- U.S. National Register of Historic Places
- Location within Iowa Location within the United States
- Location: 129 S. Main St., Maquoketa, Iowa
- Coordinates: 42°04′06″N 90°39′54″W
- Area: less than one acre
- Built: 1882
- Architectural style: Italianate
- NRHP reference No.: 86000718
- Added to NRHP: April 10, 1986

The D.H. Anderson Building, also known as the Sue's Hallmark Store, was a historic building located in Maquoketa, Iowa, United States. The three-story brick building was built in 1882 by Dr. Galloway Truax, a local druggist. The grocery firm of D. H. Anderson initially occupied the first-floor commercial space, and Anderson bought the building in 1888. It remained in the family until 1956. A lawyer and the Knights of Pythias occupied the second floor, and the Masons occupied the third floor. The building had an unusual gable roof to accommodate the Masons' desire for a vaulted ceiling. After the Masons moved out in 1902, the Knights of Pythias occupied the third floor until 1957. Various retail establishments occupied the first-floor retail space. The building was damaged in a 1971 fire. It was listed on the National Register of Historic Places in 1986.

The building was destroyed in a massive fire on January 19, 2008, that also destroyed four other buildings with a sixth severely damaged. The Mitchell-Maskrey Mill across the alley was also damaged.
