= Senator Moen =

Senator Moen may refer to:

- Rodney C. Moen (born 1937), Wisconsin State Senate
- Tollef Edward Moen (1870–1950), Iowa Stat Senate
