= John Hager =

John Hager may refer to:

- John S. Hager (1818–1890), U.S. Senator from California
- John H. Hager (1936–2020), American politician from Virginia and U.S. Assistant Secretary of Education
- John Henry Hager (Iowa politician) (1870–1952), American politician from Iowa
- John Hager (cartoonist) (1858–1932), cartoonist of Dok's Dippy Duck
