= Maquoketa Community High School =

Public school in Iowa, United States

Location
- 6000 Washington Street; Maquoketa, Iowa 52060; United States

Information
- Type: Public secondary
- School district: Maquoketa Community School District
- Principal: Mark Vervaecke
- Teaching staff: 34.36 (FTE)
- Grades: 9-12
- Enrollment: 495 (2023-2024)
- Student to teacher ratio: 14.41
- Colors: Red and White
- Mascot: Cardinal
- Affiliation: WaMaC Conference
- Website: www.maquoketaschools.org/o/hs

Maquoketa Community High School is a public high school in Maquoketa, Iowa, United States. It is located at 600 Washington, Maquoketa, Iowa.

It is the only high school in the Maquoketa Community School District.

== Athletics ==
The Cardinals compete in the River Valley Conference in the following sports:

- Baseball
  - Class 3A State champions - 1983
- Basketball (boys and girls)
  - Girls 2026 3A State Champions
- Bowling
  - Boys' 2023 Class 1A State Champions
- Cross Country (boys and girls)
  - Girls' Class 2A State Champions - 1986, 1995
- Football
- Golf (boys and girls)
  - Girls' State Champions - 1989, 2004
- Soccer (boys and girls)
- Softball
- Tennis (boys and girls)
- Track and Field (boys and girls)
- Volleyball
- Wrestling

== Notable alumni ==
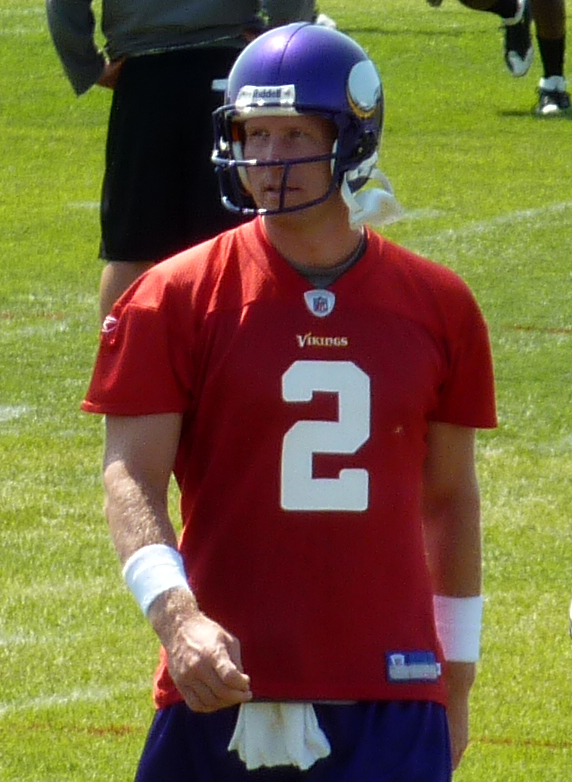
Sage Rosenfels

- Tod Bowman, Former State Senator for Iowa and Government teacher at the school.
- Robert A. Millikan, Nobel Prize of Science winner
- Sage Rosenfels, quarterback in the NFL
- William Welch, inventor of the High School Diploma

== See also ==
- List of high schools in Iowa
