= Senator Leonard =

Senator Leonard may refer to:

- Arthur Gray Leonard (1870–?), Iowa State Senate
- Bill Leonard (politician) (born 1947), California State Senate
- George Leonard (congressman) (1729–1819), Massachusetts State Senate
- Jerris Leonard (1931–2006), Wisconsin State Senate
- Larry Leonard (1934–2002), Illinois State Senate
- Randy Leonard (born 1952), Oregon State Senate
- Timothy D. Leonard (1940–2026), Oklahoma State Senate

== See also ==
- James B. Leonardo (1889–1962), Illinois State Senate
