= Senator Hager =

Senator Hager may refer to:

- Alva L. Hager (1850–1923), Iowa State Senate
- Henry G. Hager (1934–2024), Pennsylvania State Senate
- John Henry Hager (Iowa politician) (1871–1952), Iowa State Senate
- John S. Hager (1818–1890), U.S. Senator from California from 1873 to 1875
- Peter Hager II (1784–1854), New York State Senate

== See also ==
- Glenn Hegar (born 1970), Texas State Senate
