= Garritt Roelofs =

American politician (1900–1976)

Member of the Iowa Senate from the 49th district
- In office January 9, 1933 – January 10, 1937
- Preceded by: Tollef Edward Moen
- Succeeded by: Charles B. Hoeven

Personal details
- Born: June 6, 1900 Prinsburg, Minnesota
- Died: November 21, 1976 (aged 76) Grand Rapids, Michigan
- Party: Republican
- Occupation: educator, newspaper founder, politician

Garritt E. Roelofs (June 6, 1900 – November 21, 1976) was an American educator, newspaper founder, and politician.

== Early life and education ==
Garritt E. Roelofs was born to parents Evert Jans Roelofs and Jessie de Vries on June 6, 1900. Both of his parents were of Dutch descent. After attending country school near his hometown of Prinsburg, Minnesota, Roelofs moved to Grand Rapids, Michigan, to further his education at Calvin Preparatory School and Calvin College, graduating in 1918 and 1921, respectively. In 1919, Roelofs was a student at the University of Minnesota, and during 1922, he was enrolled at the University of Michigan.

== Career in education and media ==
Roelofs began his career in education by serving for two years as a principal at a Christian grammar school in Edgerton, Minnesota. He then taught English literature at a Christian school in Holland, Michigan, for one year, before moving to Western Academy in Hull, Iowa, for the next eight years. For the last four years of his tenure at Western, Roelofs was also principal of the school. In 1930, Roelofs founded the Sioux Center News, and served as the newspaper's editor and publisher.

== Public service career ==
Roelofs served a single four-year term on the Iowa Senate for District 49 from January 9, 1933, to January 10, 1937. During his state legislative tenure, Roelofs was affiliated with the Republican Party. After stepping down from the state senate, Roelofs became the first director of the Iowa State Unemployment Compensation Commission, which later became known as the State Employment Security Service. From 1938, Roelofs worked for the United States Department of Agriculture as North Central Regional Information Officer. In 1943, he joined the Office of Price Administration as an adviser for agricultural rationing and pricing policies. During the occupation of Japan following World War II, Roelofs was employed for four years by Douglas MacArthur's staff as a civilian consultant specializing in natural resources. Roelofs returned to Japan in 1952 as a public affairs officer in the Embassy of the United States, Tokyo. After leaving public service, Roelofs visited India as a member of the Rockefeller Foundation, and went to Burma while affiliated with Robert R. Nathan Associates. Roelofs was hired by the United States Agency for International Development in 1960 and sent on a two-year tour of Colombia. After returning to the United States and visiting the Netherlands, Roelofs spent over three years in Uganda.

== Later life and legacy ==
Roelofs retired in 1968, and settled in Washington, D. C. for two years, before deciding to return to Grand Rapids, Michigan, in 1970. He died of a heart ailment at home in Grand Rapids on November 21, 1976. A collection of his papers are held by Calvin University.
