= Chris Reese =

Danish-born American newspaper editor, musician and politician

Chris Reese (June 21, 1881 – February 9, 1957) was a Danish-born American newspaper editor, musician, and politician.

Chris Reese was born in Hovedgård, Denmark, on June 21, 1881. Reese and his parents moved to Storm Lake, Iowa, in 1891. After completing high school, Reese began working as a newspaper editor, successively with the Lynn Grove Independent, Remsen News, Carroll Times, Marshalltown Marshalltownian, Marcus News, Fenton Reporter and the Whittemore Champion. Reese edited the Upper Des Moines of Algona from 1941 to 1945, when he acquired the Ocheyedan Press, only to return to the Upper Des Moines two years later.

While in Marshalltown, Reese led an orchestra that played at the town's silent film theatre, and served in the Iowa General Assembly. He was the high school band director in Ocheyedan, and led school and summer bands while residing in Fenton and Whittemore.

Reese was elected to a single term on the Iowa Senate in 1932. A Democrat, he held the District 28 seat from January 9, 1933, to December 20, 1936. Reese was subsequently appointed a member of the Iowa Highway Commission, and later served as assistant state printer until 1939.

Reese died of cancer at the Algona home of his stepdaughter Beverly Zender on February 9, 1957.
