= Maquoketa Company–Clinton Machine Company Administration Building =

Historic building in Iowa, United States

- U.S. National Register of Historic Places
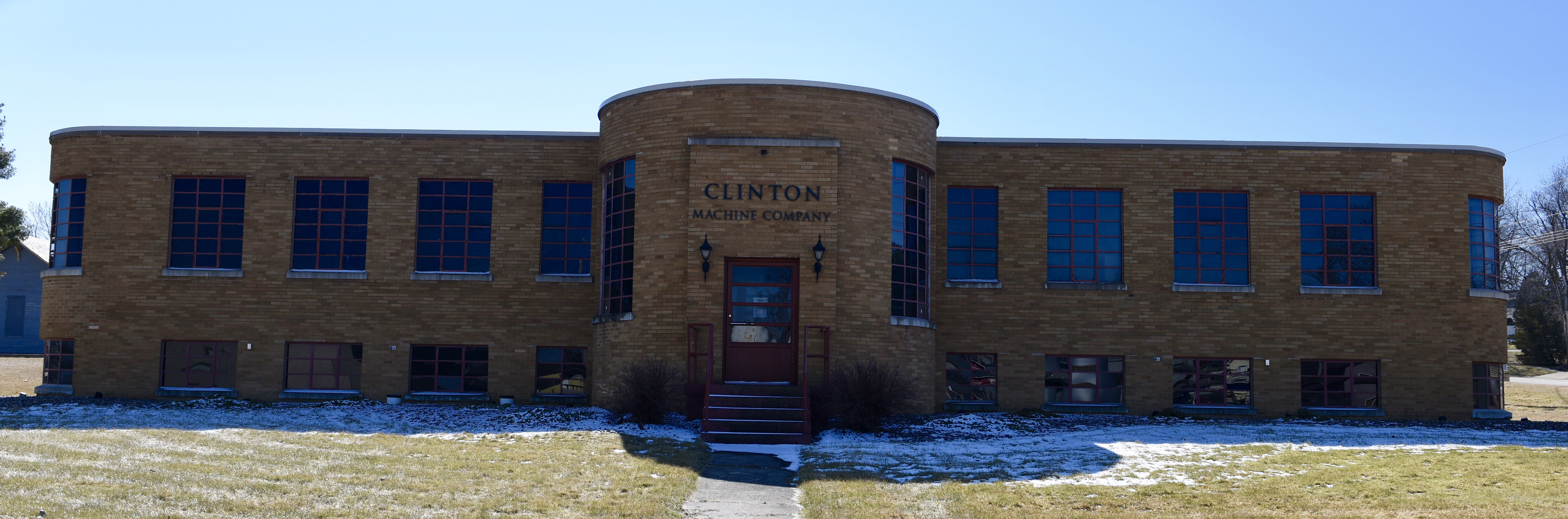

- Location within Iowa Location within the United States
- Location: 605 E. Maple St. Maquoketa, Iowa
- Coordinates: 42°03′57″N 90°39′30″W
- Area: 5 acres (2.0 ha)
- Built: 1947
- Built by: The Maquoketa Company
- Architectural style: Moderne
- NRHP reference No.: 06000712
- Added to NRHP: August 23, 2006

The Maquoketa Company–Clinton Machine Company Administration Building, also known as Building #7: Clinton Engines Corporation Administration Building, is a historic building located in Maquoketa, Iowa, United States. It was listed on the National Register of Historic Places in 2006.

== History ==
C.A. Depue was the president of the Central Steel Tube Company in Clinton, Iowa when he opened a small factory in Maquoketa to manufacture machine gun components during World War II. He expanded the operation calling it The Maquoketa Company, and built a factory on the east side of town. This building was built as an office building for the plant from 1945 to about 1947. By 1950 the factory had grown to 160,000 square feet (15,000 m^{2}). That same year Depue sold the facility to Don Thomas, who moved his Clinton Machine Company from Clinton, Michigan to Maquoketa. The Maquoketa Company moved to Clinton, Iowa.

Clinton Machine Company manufactured small gasoline engines, and by 1956 they were the tenth largest employer in Iowa. They changed their name to Clinton Engines Corporation in 1958. It was at this time that farmers began working in the factory and farmed around their shift work. Thomas sold the company to the Charnay Group, an investment company based in New York City. The company manufactured engines for washing machines, chain saws, outboard motors, industrial air circulation fans, and lawn mowers for a variety of companies. It won the President's "E" Award in 1966. However, the Charnay Group failed to adequately support Clinton Engines financially, and it had to file for bankruptcy the same year. Clinton Engines was sold to Martin Hoffinger, a New York investor, who operated the company on a reduced basis. It was eventually downsized to produce spare parts for engine repairs. By 1999 there were only about 35 employees left. The plant was in disrepair when it closed that year. In 2000 the facility was donated to the city of Maquoketa, who tore down the factory and maintained the office building. The Jackson County Historical Society maintains the Clinton Engines Museum, the Jackson County Research & Family History Library, the JCHS Media Arts Center, the Clinton Engines Association, and a large program center in the building.

== Architecture ==
Building #7, as it was known, is a single-story, brick structure, with a full basement. The building was locally designed and constructed by employees of the Maquoketa Company in the Moderne style. This is the only building in the county that was built in this style. It features simple lines, shapes, and planar surfaces. Both the main entryway on the north side of the building and its corners are rounded. The building sits on a 5-acre (2.0 ha) lot, and is fronted by a park-like setting, which is how the building was always situated. The factory sat immediately behind it. In the 1950s the property was planted with evergreen trees, shrubs, and flowers. They were removed over the years.
