= Mitchell-Maskrey Mill =

- U.S. National Register of Historic Places
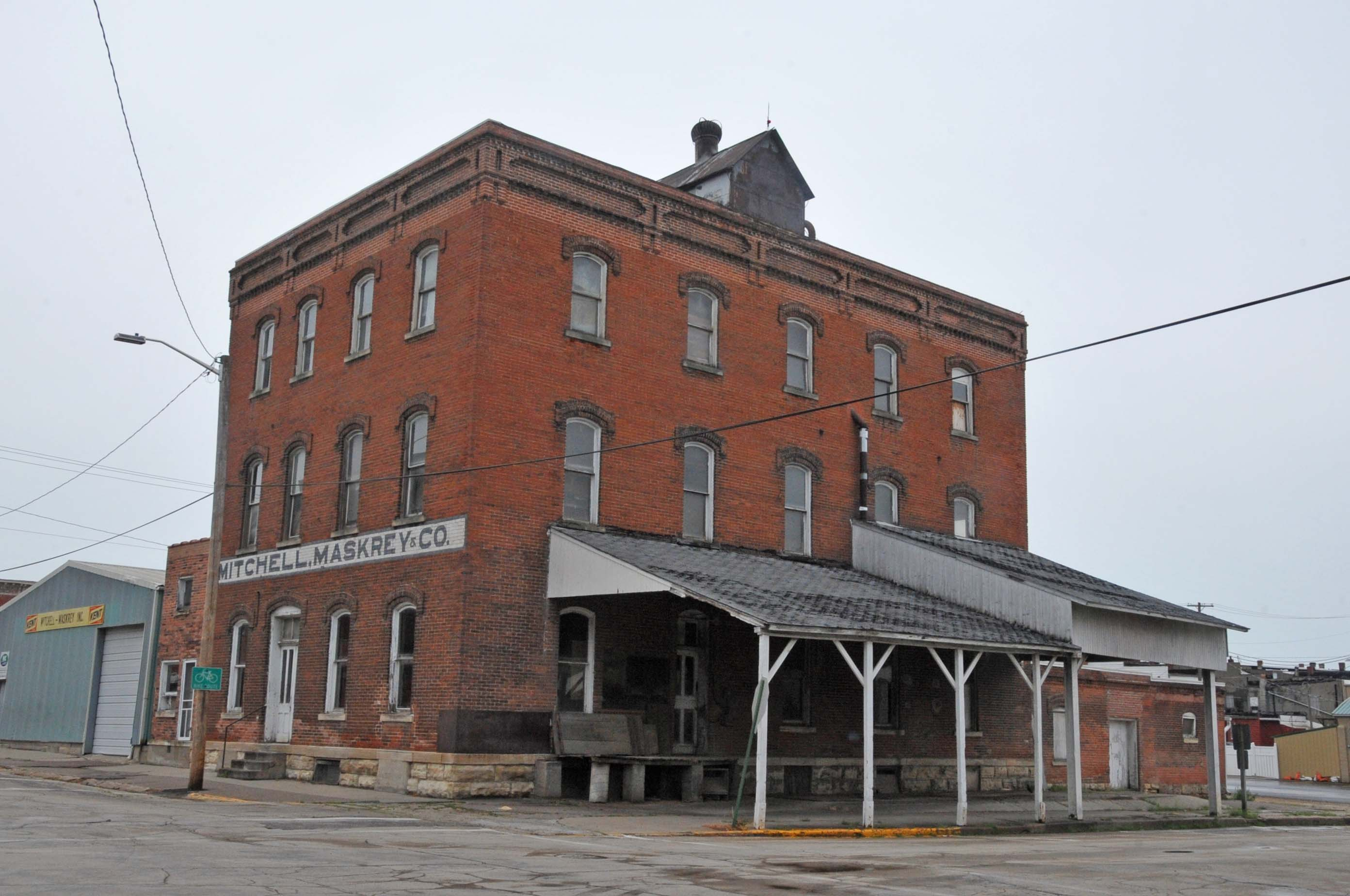

- Location within Iowa Location within the United States
- Location: 120 E. Pleasant; Maquoketa, Iowa
- Coordinates: 42°04′04″N 90°39′52″W
- Area: less than one acre
- Built: 1886
- MPS: Maquoketa MPS
- NRHP reference No.: 89002111
- Added to NRHP: August 9, 1991

Mitchell-Maskrey Mill is a historic building located in Maquoketa, Iowa, United States. John Goodenow started the first milling operation in the Maquoketa area in 1838. He sold it to Joseph McCloy who established a larger operation along Mill Creek south of town in 1842. Edward Maskry leased this operation in 1865. He purchased this lot from the Methodist Church a few years later, and operated a mill in the old sanctuary. This three story brick structure was built in 1886 around the old frame church. When it was completed the old church building was dismantled. While it has changed owners, the facility has continuously served the same company. Frank Mitchell partnered with Stephen Maskrey in 1912, and the company has been known as Mitchell-Maskrey Co. ever since. This is the only industrial building in Maquoketa's central business district. The building was listed on the National Register of Historic Places in 1991. The mill sustained some damage in a massive fire on January 19, 2008, that destroyed five buildings and severely damaged a sixth immediately to the west.
