= Maquoketa Community School District =

Public school district in Maquketa, Iowa, United States

Coordinates: 42.060952°N 90.673467°W

Location
- Maquoketa, Iowa Jackson, Clinton, and Dubuque counties United States
- Coordinates: 42.060952, -90.673467

District information
- Type: Local school district
- Grades: K-12
- Superintendent: Tara Notz
- Schools: 4
- Budget: $22,555,000 (2020-21)
- NCES District ID: 1918510

Students and staff
- Students: 1,314 (2022-23)
- Teachers: 105.05 FTE
- Staff: 120.91 FTE
- Student–teacher ratio: 12.51
- Athletic conference: River Valley Conference
- District mascot: Cardinals
- Colors: Red and White

Other information
- Website: www.maquoketaschools.org

The Maquoketa Community School District is a rural public school district based in Maquoketa, Iowa. The district is mainly in Jackson County, with small areas in Clinton, and Dubuque counties. The district serves the cities of Maquoketa, Baldwin, Zwingle, and surrounding rural areas.

Chris Hoover was hired as the superintendent in 2014, after serving as shared superintendent in South Winneshiek Community School District and Turkey Valley Community School District.

The graduation rate of this school district is 80%, which is "well below state median" according to USNews.

In sports, they are a part of the WaMaC Conference, made up of multiple Eastern Iowan schools.

The school district's mascot is the Cardinals. Their colors are red and white.

== Schools ==
The district operates four schools, all in Maquoketa:

- Briggs Elementary School
- Cardinal Elementary School
- Maquoketa Middle School
- Maquoketa Community High School

== See also ==
- List of school districts in Iowa
- List of high schools in Iowa
