= Howard Tabor =

American politician (1893–1968)

Personal details
- Born: March 13, 1893 Baldwin, Iowa, U.S.
- Died: April 5, 1968 (aged 75)
- Party: Democratic
- Spouse: Ella C. Peterson (m. 1923)
- Education: Cedar Rapids Business College
- Occupation: Politician, farmer

Military service
- Branch/service: United States Navy

Howard Tabor (March 13, 1893 – April 5, 1968) was an American politician.

Howard Tabor was born on March 13, 1893, to parents Ella and George Tabor. After graduating from Baldwin High School, Tabor enrolled at Cedar Rapids Business College, then returned to the family farm near Baldwin. Tabor served in the United States Navy during World War I, and married Sabula native Ella C. Peterson on June 6, 1923. The couple raised two sons. Jack worked alongside his father as a farmer, while James pursued education in medical field at the University of Iowa College of Medicine, and later moved to Englewood, Colorado.

Howard Tabor was a member of an Agricultural Adjustment Administration committee for seven years. Tabor was elected to his first term on the Iowa House of Representatives in 1958 as a Democratic Party candidate. He held the District 46 seat for three terms, from January 12, 1959, to January 10, 1965. Between January 11, 1965, and January 8, 1967, Tabor was a member of the Iowa Senate for District 19.

Tabor died on April 5, 1968, survived by his wife, sons, and three of his five siblings.
