= Sage Rosenfels =

American football player (born 1978)

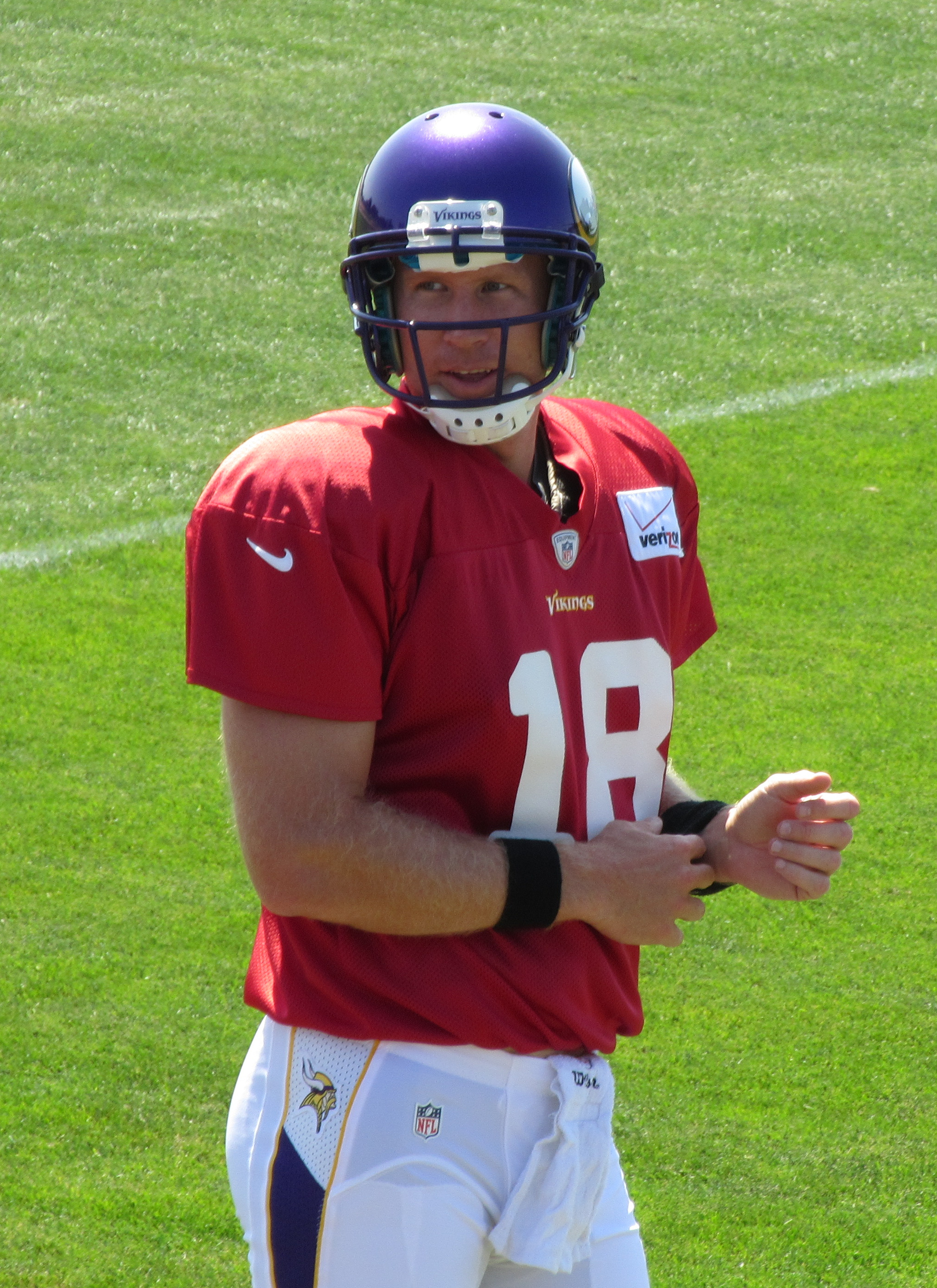
- Rosenfels with the Minnesota Vikings

No. 18, 2
- Position: Quarterback

Personal information
- Born: March 6, 1978 (age 48); Maquoketa, Iowa, U.S.
- Listed height: 6 ft 4 in (1.93 m)
- Listed weight: 222 lb (101 kg)

Career information
- High school: Maquoketa Community
- College: Iowa State (1996–2000)
- NFL draft: 2001: 4th round, 109th overall pick

Career history
- Washington Redskins (2001); Miami Dolphins (2002–2005); Houston Texans (2006–2008); Minnesota Vikings (2009); New York Giants (2010–2011); Miami Dolphins (2011); Minnesota Vikings (2011)

Career NFL statistics
- Passing attempts: 562
- Passing completions: 351
- Completion percentage: 62.5%
- TD–INT: 30–29
- Passing yards: 4,156
- Passer rating: 81.2
- Stats at Pro Football Reference

Sage Jamen Rosenfels (born March 6, 1978) is an American former professional football player who was a quarterback in the National Football League (NFL). He played college football for the Iowa State Cyclones and was selected by the Washington Redskins in the fourth round of the 2001 NFL draft. He also played in the NFL with the Miami Dolphins from 2002 to 2005, the Houston Texans from 2006 to 2008, the Minnesota Vikings in 2009, and the New York Giants in 2010. He spent portions of the 2011 season with the Vikings and Dolphins, after being released by the Giants during preseason.

== Early life ==
Rosenfels was born just outside Maquoketa, Iowa, a town of approximately 6,000, to a Jewish father and a gentile mother. He was the fourth of five children.

He attended Maquoketa Community High School, where he was a letterman in football, basketball, baseball, tennis, and track, as well as a member of the National Honor Society.

In football, he played quarterback, defensive back, punter, and kicker. As a senior, he was a first team All-District selection, was named as an All-Eastern Iowa selection by the Quad City Times and the Dubuque Telegraph Herald, and was honored as a second team Class 3-A All-State defensive back by the Des Moines Register. His senior year, he threw for 1,150 yards and 10 touchdowns.

In basketball, he was a three-year letterman. As a junior, he was an All-State Honorable Mention selection. As a senior, he named as an All-Eastern Iowa selection by the Quad City Times, and was an All-State selection. In baseball, playing third base, he was twice named as an All-District selection, was a two-time All-Conference selection, and was a two-time All-State selection. In tennis, he was a four-year letterman. In the only season he competed in track, Rosenfels was a member of the 4x200-meter relay team which placed at the State Championships. He graduated from Maquoketa High School in 1996.

== College career ==
Rosenfels was a two-year starter at Iowa State University. During the 2000 season, Rosenfels led the Cyclones to an 8–3 regular season mark, and a trip to the Insight.com Bowl in Phoenix, Arizona. He led his team to key wins versus Iowa, Missouri, Kansas, Oklahoma State, and Colorado where he had more than 100 rushing yards.

The Cyclones defeated the University of Pittsburgh in the bowl game, and Rosenfels (23–34; 308 yards; 2 touchdowns) was named Offensive MVP. He was also named Offensive MVP of the Cyclones for the 2000 season. The win against Pittsburgh was the first bowl victory in Iowa State's 108-year football history.

Rosenfels graduated from Iowa State University in December 2000 with a BA degree in marketing. National Football Scouting Inc., a combine services that analyzed college players for NFL teams, rated Rosenfels the second-best NFL prospect among senior quarterbacks.

== Professional career ==
Pre-draft measurables
Height	Weight	Arm length	Hand span	40-yard dash	10-yard split	20-yard split	20-yard shuttle	Three-cone drill	Vertical jump	Broad jump	Wonderlic
6 ft 4 3/8 in (1.94 m)	228 lb (103 kg)	32 in (0.81 m)	10 1/4 in (0.26 m)	4.74 s	1.69 s	2.76 s	4.29 s	7.07 s	34.0 in (0.86 m)	8 ft 11 in (2.72 m)	32
All values from NFL Combine

=== Washington Redskins (2001) ===
Rosenfels, selected by the Washington Redskins in the fourth round of the 2001 NFL draft, spent one season as the team's third-string quarterback.

=== First stint with Miami Dolphins (2002–2005) ===
He was acquired by the Miami Dolphins on August 22, 2002, in exchange for a 2003 seventh round draft pick. In 2004 he threw a touchdown pass for 76 yards, which tied for the 8th-longest pass of the year in the NFL.

In 2005, Rosenfels led Miami's biggest comeback since 1974, when he entered their Week 13 game against the Buffalo Bills. After Gus Frerotte was sidelined by a concussion in the third quarter, Rosenfels entered the game with the Dolphins trailing 23–3. Rosenfels led the team on three fourth-quarter scoring drives, as he threw for 272 yards and 2 touchdowns, as they beat the Bills, 24–23.

Two weeks later, Rosenfels entered the game at halftime versus the New York Jets with the score tied 10–10, and led them on two scoring drives to get the win 24–20.

=== Houston Texans (2006–2008) ===
He signed with the Houston Texans as an unrestricted free agent on March 13, 2006.

In 2006, the Houston Texans trailed the Tennessee Titans 21–3 before he threw three second-half touchdown passes to cut the lead to 28–22 as time ended the comeback.

The Sporting News' February 2007 off-season awards issue predicted that Rosenfels would be 2007's Tony Romo, the breakout quarterback of the year coming from a backup role.

In 2007, the Houston Texans trailed the Tennessee Titans 32–7 entering the fourth quarter. Rosenfels tied an NFL record by throwing four 4th-quarter touchdown passes, to give the Texans a 36–35 lead before Rob Bironas kicked his NFL-record 8th field goal to give the Titans a 38–36 win. Rosenfels finished the 2007 season at 4–1 as a starter, in comparison to Matt Schaub's 4–7 on the season. He completed 154-of-240 passes for 1,684 yards and 15 touchdowns. His passing touchdown percentage of 6.3% was fourth-best in the NFL for the season, and his pass completion percentage of 64.2% was the 10th-best in the NFL.

In 2008, Rosenfels started the Texans' home opener against the Indianapolis Colts. Although Rosenfels had led the team to a 27–10 lead with 8:18 remaining, Indianapolis scored a touchdown to make the score 27–17 with 4:04 left. Rosenfels fumbled twice, one of which was returned for a touchdown after he attempted to hurdle multiple defenders, after which the Colts took the lead and sealed the 31–27 victory following a last-minute interception.

Rosenfels got his first win as a starter in 2008 in a November game against the Cleveland Browns. His second win of the season came against the Jacksonville Jaguars in the Houston Texans' first ever Monday Night Football appearance.

In his three seasons with the Texans, Rosenfels went 6–4 as a starter. Through the 2008 season, he had thrown 30 career touchdown passes.

=== First stint with Minnesota Vikings (2009) ===
Rosenfels was acquired from the Texans by the Minnesota Vikings on February 27, 2009. In exchange, the Texans received a fourth-round pick in the 2009 NFL draft. After failing to negotiate the rights to No. 18 from wide receiver Sidney Rice, Rosenfels decided to wear No. 2 because he had two children named Peyton and Ava and his favorite band is U2. Rosenfels was originally supposed to battle Tarvaris Jackson for the starting spot, but his role changed to third-string quarterback after Brett Favre was signed.

=== New York Giants (2010–2011) ===
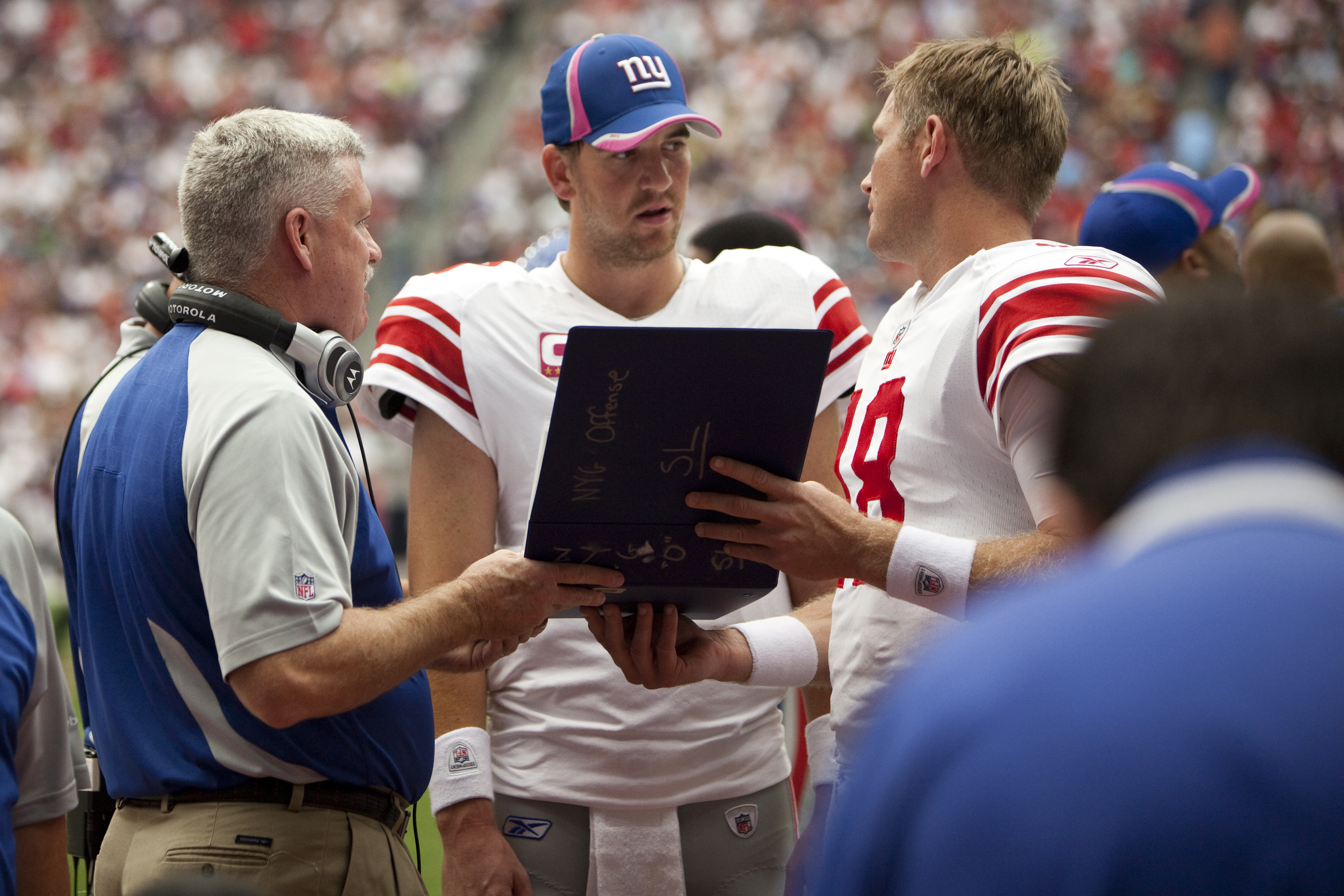
Rosenfels (right) talking to Kevin Gilbride (left) and Eli Manning.

On September 3, 2010, Rosenfels was traded, along with RB Darius Reynaud, to the New York Giants. He was Eli Manning's backup throughout the season, and also was the team's holder for field goals and extra points. His only action at quarterback was in the 4th quarter of a victory at Seattle.

In 2011, in his one preseason game he completed 13 of 19 passes, for 129 yards, even though he played with strep throat. He missed most of the pre-season and on September 3 was placed on injured reserve when he contracted bacteremia. On October 4, he was released with an injury settlement. At the time, he had a career 81.2 quarterback rating.

=== Second stint with Miami Dolphins (2011) ===
On October 6, 2011, Rosenfels signed a one-year deal for $970,000 with the Miami Dolphins after a season-ending injury to Chad Henne. The Dolphins chose Rosenfels after also working out Kellen Clemens, J. P. Losman, Brett Ratliff, Jim Sorgi, and Charlie Frye. Rosenfels was placed on the reserve/non-football illness list on October 25. He was waived from the list on December 1.

=== Second stint with Minnesota Vikings (2011–2012) ===
The Minnesota Vikings claimed Rosenfels off waivers on December 2, 2011. On August 31, 2012, as the Vikings reduced their roster down to league maximum of 53 players, he was released.

== Career statistics ==
=== NFL ===
Year	Team	Games		Passing								Rushing				Sacked		Fumbles	
Year	Team	GP	GS	Cmp	Att	Pct	Yds	Avg	TD	Int	Rtg	Att	Yds	Avg	TD	Sck	SckY	Fum	Lost
2001	WAS	0	0	DNP															
2002	MIA	4	0	0	3	0.0	0	0.0	0	0	39.6	2	−9	−4.5	0	0	0	0	0
2003	MIA	2	0	4	6	66.7	50	8.3	1	0	131.9	1	−1	−1.0	0	0	0	0	0
2004	MIA	3	1	16	39	41.0	264	6.8	1	3	41.0	0	0	0.0	0	3	3	2	0
2005	MIA	4	1	34	61	55.7	462	7.6	4	3	81.5	6	15	2.5	0	0	0	1	0
2006	HOU	4	0	27	39	69.2	265	6.6	3	1	103.0	4	5	1.3	0	1	5	0	0
2007	HOU	9	5	154	240	64.2	1,684	7.0	15	12	84.8	21	51	2.4	1	6	48	4	3
2008	HOU	6	5	116	164	66.7	1,431	8.7	6	10	79.5	11	37	3.4	0	9	58	4	2
2009	MIN	0	0	DNP															
2010	NYG	12	0	0	0	0.0	0	0.0	0	0	0.0	3	−3	−1.0	0	0	0	0	0
2011	MIA	0	0	DNP															
2011	MIN	0	0	DNP															
Career		43	12	351	562	62.5	4,156	7.4	30	29	81.2	48	95	2.0	1	19	127	11	5

=== College ===
Year	Team	Games		Passing								Rushing				
Year	Team	GP	GS	Cmp	Att	Pct	Yds	Lng	TD	Int	Rtg	Att	Yds	Avg	Lng	TD
1997	Iowa State	4	0	4	10	40.0	37	13	0	2	31.1	2	20	10	13	0
1998	Iowa State	4	0	3	9	33.3	48	42	0	1	55.9	4	34	8.5	18	0
1999	Iowa State	11	11	127	235	54.0	1,781	80	10	11	122.4	80	225	2.8	52	4
2000	Iowa State	11	11	172	333	51.7	2,298	78	8	12	110.3	78	381	4.9	36	10
Career		30	22	306	587	52.1	4,164	80	18	26	113.0	164	660	4.0	52	14

== Post-NFL career ==
Rosenfels is a writing contributor for The Athletic Minnesota and theScore.com. He also serves as a color analyst for Iowa State games on Cyclones TV and a radio host for ESPN 1500 in Minnesota. In 2018, he joined the cast of Late Night Tailgate a touring sports discussion and comedy show produced by MBM Entertainment, The Kicker and IMG Artists. As part of this tour, Rosenfels made both his standup comedy as well as his singing debut at Irving Arts Center on October 10, 2018. His a capella performance of "I Will Always Love You," written by Dolly Parton and later recorded by Whitney Houston was captured on film by the Irving Community Television Network.

== See also ==
- List of select Jewish football players
