= Matthew Luckiesh =

American physicist (1883–1967)

- Born: September 14, 1883; Maquoketa, Iowa, United States
- Died: November 2, 1967; Shaker Heights, Ohio, United States
- Known for: "Father of the Science of Seeing", MAZDA lamps, Visibility Meter
- Notable work: Light, Vision and Seeing (1944), Color and Colors (1938)
- Children: 2 daughters
- Scientific career
- Fields: Physics, Optics, Lighting Engineering
- Workplaces: General Electric, Nela Park Lighting Research Laboratory

Matthew Luckiesh DSc, DE, (September 14, 1883 Maquoketa, Iowa – November 2, 1967 Shaker Heights, Ohio) was a physicist and, as the Director of General Electric's Lighting Research Laboratory at its Nela Park National Lamps Works facility in East Cleveland, Ohio, he pursued research on light and vision. In his day, he was known as the "Father of the Science of Seeing."

Luckiesh developed several theories on color and its physiological effect on people. He was also interested in determining the conditions under which optimal visibility was achieved, and in examining the relationship between light and seeing, in order to design better types of lamps. During World War I he studied camouflage, and later invented artificial sunlight and germicidal lamps. Luckiesh produced eleven U.S. patents, 28 books and about 860 scientific and technical articles, published between 1911 and 1960.

Asked how to say his name, he told The Literary Digest "My name is pronounced as if it were spelled loo'kish. The u in the first syllable is the u in rude, and the second syllable rimes with dish."

== Early life and family ==
After growing up in Cleveland and attending universities in Iowa, Luckiesh returned to Cleveland to start work for the General Electric, Lamp Division in 1910.

Luckiesh was married with two daughters and was a Roman Catholic.

== Lighting pioneer ==
Among the lamps attributed to Luckiesh was the MAZDA Flametint Lamp, which was designed to create mood and to resemble the color of licking flames, rather than to produce adequate light for serious seeing. In 1927 about 25-35% of all lamps sold were of that design, and in 1929 sales totaled about 13 million. Another of his lamps, referred to as the MAZDA Daylight Lamp, had coiled tungsten filaments and transparent blue glass. The lamp approximated average daylight colors and was used in department stores and settings where it was important to determine accurate discrimination of the colors of objects.

Luckiesh wrote numerous books and articles on light and other aspects of physics, including Color and Colors, in 1938.

In 1940, Luckiesh and Frank Moss compared 5th and 6th grade students in well-lit classrooms to students in regular (poorly lit) classrooms, and found significant increases in the scores on the New Stanford Achievement Test were demonstrated by the students in the well-lit classrooms. However, it is entirely likely that the students in the poorly lit classrooms were of lower socioeconomic status and the schools were poorly funded. This may account for the discrepancy, rather than the difference in lighting conditions.

== Visibility meter ==
While "defining visibility using brightness-contrast as the primary variable" in his 1944 book, Light vision and Seeing, Luckiesh presents the 'Visibility Meter', developed in collaboration with Frank Moss. The device, used over a wide range of lighting applications, consists of a pair of similar photographic gradient filters, which increase in density when rotated together before the eyes. The filters thus reduce the apparent brightness of the observed field while lowering the contrast between the object of view and its background.

== Quotations ==
"Suppose that crippled eyes could be transformed into crippled legs. What heart rending parade we would witness on the busy street. Nearly every other person would go limping by. Many would be on crutches and some on wheel chair."

== Papers ==
- 1940 "Effects of classroom lighting upon the educational progress and visual welfare of school children" Illuminating Engineering, vol 35, pp 915–938. (with Frank K. Moss)

== Books ==
- 1915 Color and its applications, D. Van Nostrand Co., New York
- 1916 "Light And Shade And Their Applications", D. Van Nostrand Co., New York
- 1917 "The Lighting Art", D. Van Nostrand Co., New York
- 1918 "The Language Of Color", DODD, Mead and Co., New York
- 1922 Visual Illusions Dover Publications, Inc.
- 1923 "Light and Colour in Advertising and Merchandising" UK First Printing: LONDON - CROSBY LOCKWOOD AND SON. 1923
- 1937 The Science of Seeing D. Van Nostrand Co. (with Frank K. Moss)
- 1938 Color and Colors
- 1940 "Torch of Civilization: The Story of Man's Conquest of Darkness"
- 1944 Light, vision and seeing: a simplified presentation of their relationships and their importance in human efficiency and welfare D. Van Nostrand Company, Inc.
- 1945 The Meaning and Majic of Windows Libby, Owens, Ford Glass Co., Toledo, Ohio
