= John Elliot Goodenow =

American politician (1812–1902)

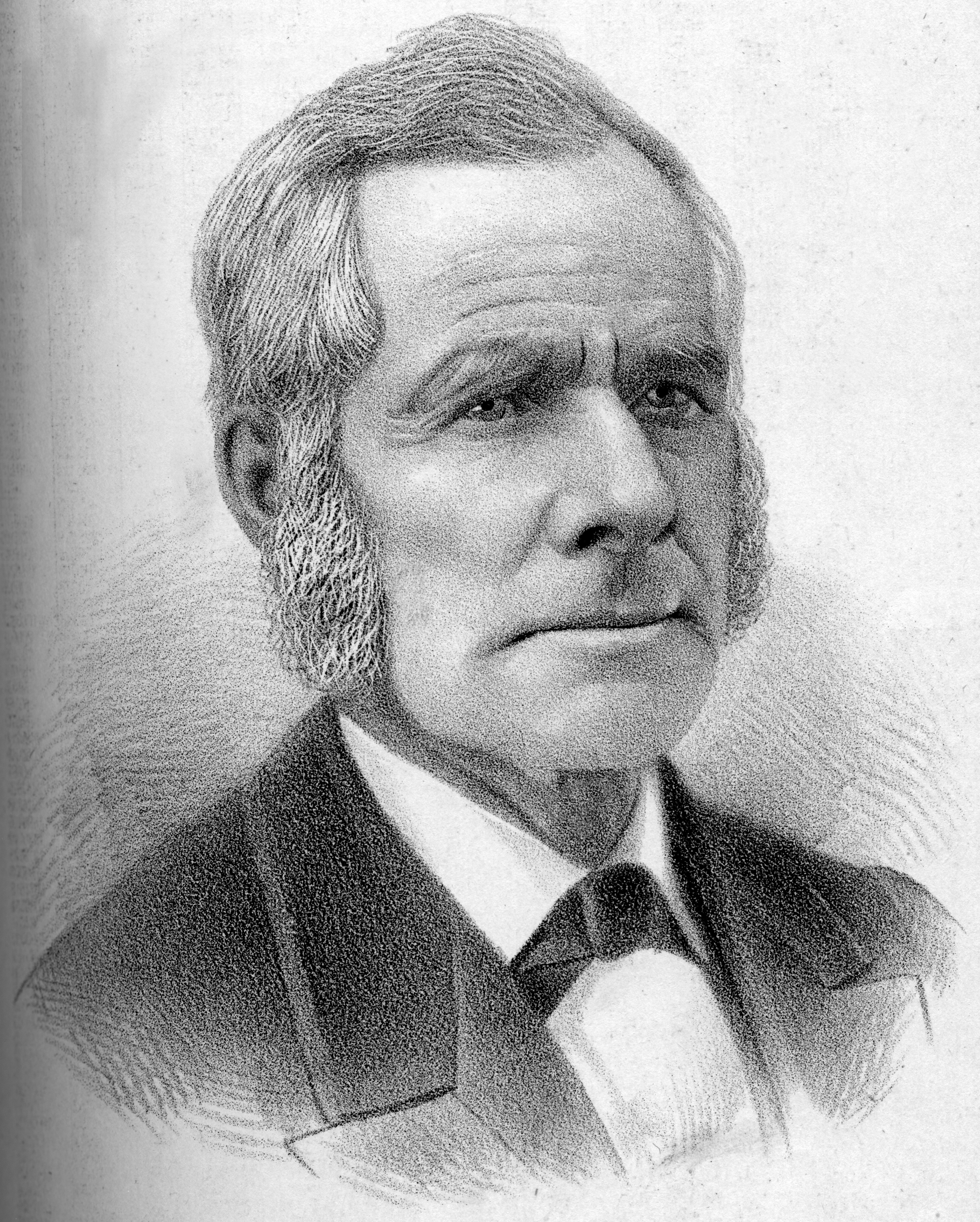

Member of the Iowa House of Representatives from the 19th district
- In office 1851/52 – December 5, 1852
- Preceded by: Richard B. Wyckoff
- Succeeded by: Samuel Coffin

Personal details
- Born: March 23, 1812 Springfield, Vermont, U.S.
- Died: September 3, 1902 (aged 90) Maquoketa, Iowa, U.S.
- Party: Democratic
- Spouse: Eliza Wright
- Children: 8
- Occupation: Businessman, farmer

John Elliot Goodenow (sometimes spelled Elliott; March 23, 1812 – September 3, 1902) was an American politician and businessman. A Democrat, he served in the Iowa House of Representatives from 1851 to 1852, representing the 19th district. He is considered the founder of Maquoketa, Iowa.

== Early life ==
Goodenow was born on March 23, 1812, in Springfield, Vermont. When he was eight years old he moved with his family to Warren County, New York, and worked on his father's farm. He was educated in common country schools.

== Career ==
At the age of 22, Goodenow bought a canal boat and used it to freight various farm products across the Champlain Canal. After two years he began to employ men to operate the boat and became a clerk at a general store in Moriah, New York. In 1837 he formed a partnership with his employer and traveled to Wisconsin Territory as a representative of the firm to buy land and engage in business, settling in what is now Maquoketa, Iowa. He began raising crops shortly thereafter. His dealings helped the Maquoketa area to become an established trading center.

He built a cabin in what is now the central part of the town and established a mill six miles north of Dubuque. In 1839 he sold his mill and moved back to New York, where he married Eliza Wright. He soon returned to Maquoketa with his wife and established its first post office in 1842.

In 1851 he was elected to the Iowa House of Representatives from the 19th district, which constituted Jackson and Jones counties, to replace Col. Richard B. Wyckoff. He was a member of the Road and Highways Committee. He also served as Maquoketa's first mayor for three terms, served as Jackson County assessor and gave Osceola and Kossuth counties their names.

== Personal life ==
Goodenow married Eliza Wright of Bolton, New York on October 3, 1839, and had eight children. He died on September 3, 1902, at his residence in Maquoketa after having a stroke, aged 90.
