= Louis H. Meyer =

American politician (1876–1960)

Louis H. Meyer (17 December 1876 – 13 April 1960) was an American politician.

Meyer was born on 17 December 1876, and raised on a farm near Readlyn, Iowa. He married Mary Rohrssen in 1899, with whom he had three children, one of whom reached adulthood. The Meyer family moved into Readlyn in 1906, where Louis Meyer continued trading livestock.

Meyer was elected to a single term on the Iowa Senate in 1932, serving District 39 as a lawmaker affiliated with the Democratic Party. In retirement, Louis Meyer moved to Englewood, Colorado, where his son resided. Meyer died in Englewood on 13 April 1960.
