= William Welch (printer) =

American printer

William M. Welch was an American manufacturer from Maquoketa, Iowa notable for inventing the High school diploma.
