= Carolyn Pendray =

American politician (1881–1958)

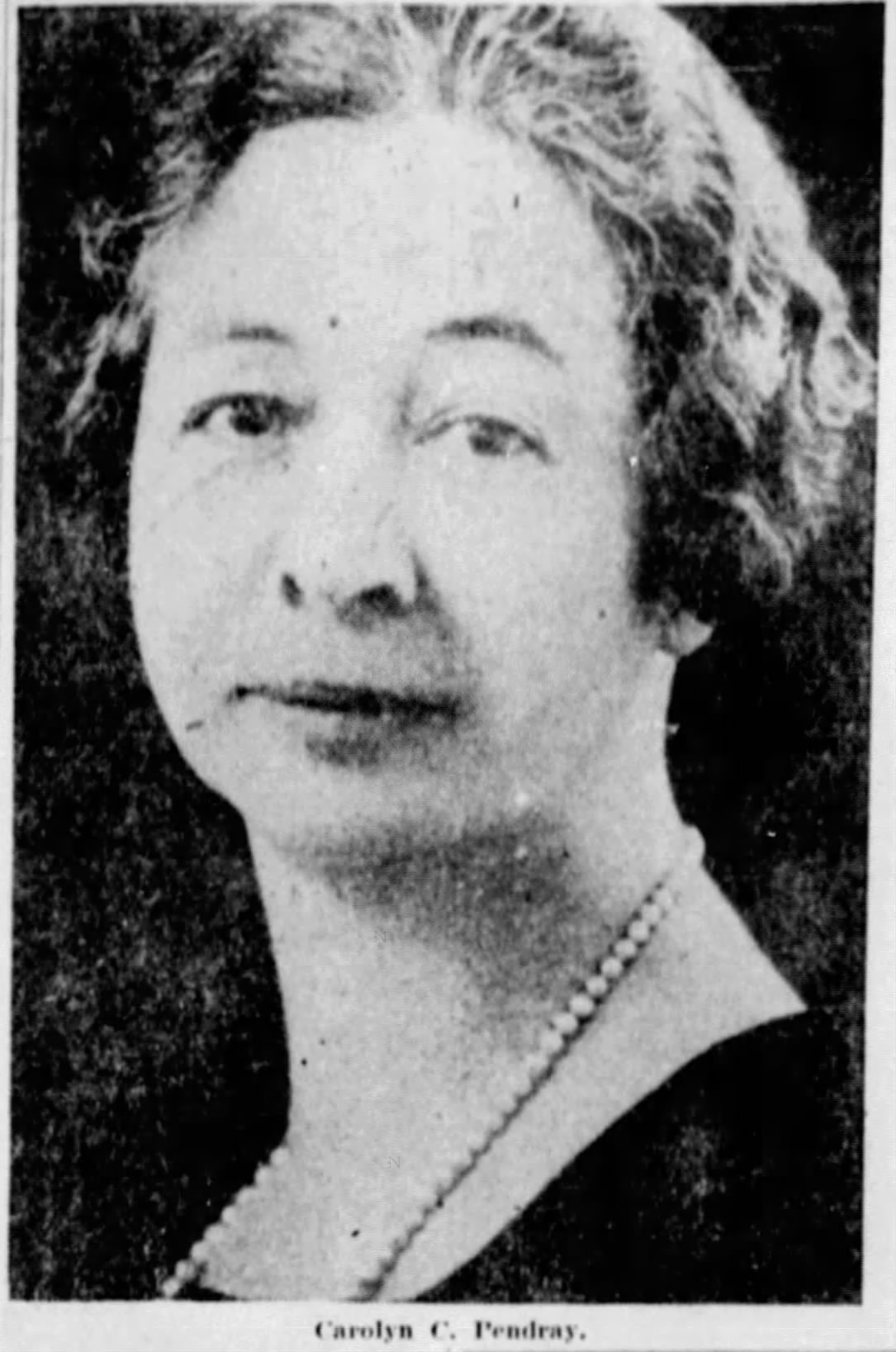
- Pendray, circa 1929

Member of the Iowa House of Representatives from the Jackson County district
- In office 1929–1933

Member of the Iowa Senate from the Jackson County district
- In office 1933–1936

Personal details
- Born: December 9, 1881 Mount Pleasant, Iowa, United States
- Died: November 23, 1958 (aged 76)
- Party: Democratic
- Profession: Educator

Carolyn (Campbell) Pendray (December 9, 1881 - November 23, 1958) born in Mount Pleasant, Iowa, United States, was an educator and politician.

Pendray was the first woman elected to the Iowa General Assembly, representing Jackson County in both the Iowa House of Representatives and the Iowa Senate.

== Early life ==
Pendray was born in Mount Pleasant, Iowa, in 1881. She attended schools in Mount Pleasant.

After passing the state teachers’ exam, Pendray taught in rural schools, and in Des Moines. In 1912, she became County Superintendent of Schools for Henry County, and continued in that position for seven years. Pendray also taught summer classes at Iowa Wesleyan University.

She married William Pendray, a merchant in Maquoketa, in 1920, and settled first in Ottumwa, and later in Maquoketa.

== Political career ==
Pendray was elected as a Democrat to the Iowa House of Representatives in 1928, where she served two terms. She was then elected to the Iowa Senate in 1932, where she again served two terms. She did not seek re-election in 1936.

Pendray supported bills which promoted the equality of women, particularly those regarding education, inheritance law, and property reform. She was considered "a strong, resolute woman who rarely gave up a fight".

== Later life ==
Pendray retired to Mount Pleasant in 1950, where she was a staunch supporter of the Democratic Party.

Pendray was an active member of the Philanthropic Educational Organization in Maquoketa, the Federated Church in Mt. Pleasant, the Daughters of the American Revolution, the P.E.O. Sisterhood, and the Congregational church.

Pendray died at age 76. She was buried at Mount Pleasant, Iowa.

In 1978, Pendray was inducted into the Iowa Women's Hall of Fame.
