= Prinsburg, Minnesota =

City in Minnesota, United States

Prinsburg
- City
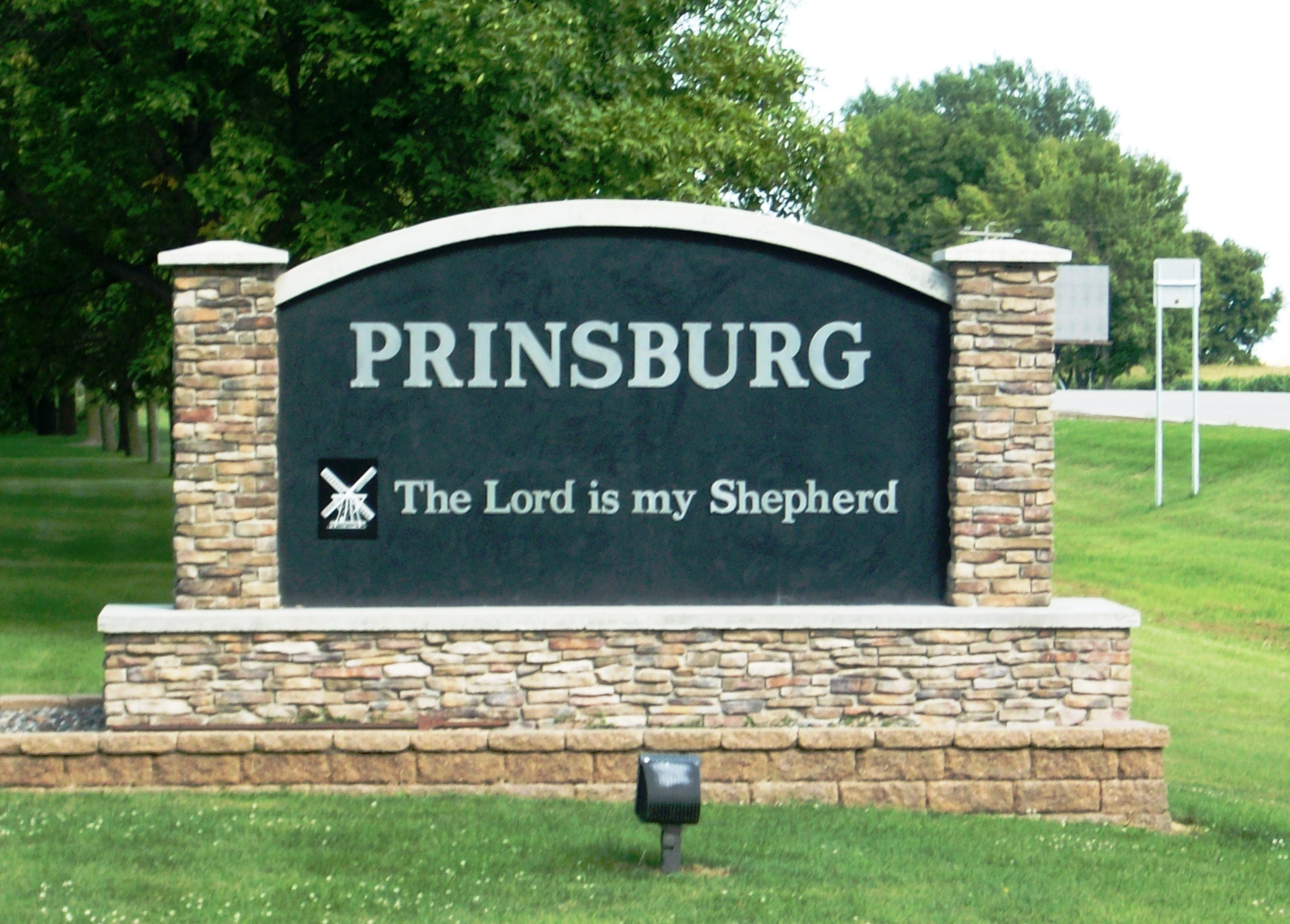

- Location of Prinsburg, Minnesota
- Coordinates: 44°56′06″N 95°11′13″W
- Country: United States
- State: Minnesota
- County: Kandiyohi

Area
  - Total: 1.01 sq mi (2.62 km^{2})
  - Land: 1.01 sq mi (2.62 km^{2})
  - Water: 0 sq mi (0.00 km^{2})
- Elevation: 1,102 ft (336 m)

Population (2020)
  - Total: 520
  - Density: 514.2/sq mi (198.52/km^{2})
- Time zone: UTC-6 (Central (CST))
  - Summer (DST): UTC-5 (CDT)
- ZIP code: 56281
- Area code: 320
- FIPS code: 27-52558
- GNIS feature ID: 2396283
- Website: https://prinsburgmn.org/

Prinsburg (/ˈprɪnzbərɡ/ PRINZ-bərg) is a city in Kandiyohi County, Minnesota, United States. The population was 520 at the 2020 census.

== History ==
Prinsburg was originally platted in 1886 by Martin Prins, a partner in the Dutch real estate firm Prins and Zwanenburg. Prins and his business partner Theodore Koch began offering land for sale in and around Prinsburg in 1885, and the town appeared shortly thereafter.

The city of Prinsburg was incorporated as a village in June 1952.

== Geography ==
According to the United States Census Bureau, the city has an area of 1.00 square mile (2.59 km^{2}), all land.

Minnesota State Highway 7 serves as a main route in the community. Kandiyohi County Road 1 also passes through Prinsburg.

== Demographics ==
Historical population
Census	Pop.	Note	%±
1960	462		—
1970	448		−3.0%
1980	557		24.3%
1990	502		−9.9%
2000	458		−8.8%
2010	497		8.5%
2020	520		4.6%
U.S. Decennial Census

=== 2020 census ===
The most reported ancestries were Dutch (43.7%), German (30.2%), and Norwegian (9.6%).

=== 2010 census ===
As of the census of 2010, there were 497 people, 207 households, and 142 families living in the city. The population density was 497.0 inhabitants per square mile (191.9/km^{2}). There were 216 housing units at an average density of 216.0 per square mile (83.4/km^{2}). The racial makeup of the city was 97.4% White, 1.2% African American, 0.4% Asian, 0.6% from other races, and 0.4% from two or more races. Hispanic or Latino of any race were 1.2% of the population.

There were 207 households, of which 28.5% had children under the age of 18 living with them, 66.7% were married couples living together, 0.5% had a female householder with no husband present, 1.4% had a male householder with no wife present, and 31.4% were non-families. 30.0% of all households were made up of individuals, and 21.2% had someone living alone who was 65 years of age or older. The average household size was 2.40 and the average family size was 2.94.

The median age in the city was 42.1 years. 25.8% of residents were under the age of 18; 5.9% were between the ages of 18 and 24; 21.2% were from 25 to 44; 21.8% were from 45 to 64; and 24.9% were 65 years of age or older. The gender makeup of the city was 49.1% male and 50.9% female.

=== 2000 census ===
As of the census of 2000, there were 458 people, 188 households, and 141 families living in the city. The population density was 434.3 inhabitants per square mile (167.7/km^{2}). There were 192 housing units at an average density of 182.1 per square mile (70.3/km^{2}). The racial makeup of the city was 99.13% White, 0.44% Asian, 0.44% from other races. Hispanic or Latino of any race were 0.44% of the population.

There were 188 households, out of which 29.3% had children under the age of 18 living with them, 73.4% were married couples living together, 0.5% had a female householder with no husband present, and 25.0% were non-families. 24.5% of all households were made up of individuals, and 17.6% had someone living alone who was 65 years of age or older. The average household size was 2.44 and the average family size was 2.89.

In the city, the population was spread out, with 24.9% under the age of 18, 6.1% from 18 to 24, 21.4% from 25 to 44, 21.4% from 45 to 64, and 26.2% who were 65 years of age or older. The median age was 43 years. For every 100 females, there were 96.6 males. For every 100 females age 18 and over, there were 91.1 males.

The median income for a household in the city was $38,125, and the median income for a family was $41,136. Males had a median income of $36,563 versus $17,321 for females. The per capita income for the city was $21,545. About 1.4% of families and 2.3% of the population were below the poverty line, including none of those under age 18 and 7.9% of those age 65 or over.

== Politics ==
The last Republican candidate for president to receive less than 82% of the vote in Prinsburg was Gerald Ford in 1976.

Presidential election results

Presidential elections results
Year	Republican	Democratic	Third parties
2024	96.2% 332	2.9% 10	0.9% 3
2020	93.9% 339	4.4% 16	1.7% 6
2016	91.0% 312	3.8% 13	5.2% 18
2012	90.9% 310	9.1% 31	0.0% 0
2008	91.1% 307	8.9% 30	0.0% 0
2004	93.1% 311	6.3% 21	0.6% 2
2000	93.5% 301	5.9% 19	0.6% 2
1996	88.4% 258	6.5% 19	5.1% 15
1992	86.3% 270	8.9% 28	4.8% 15
1988	88.6% 280	11.4% 36	0.0% 0
1984	91.8% 325	8.2% 29	0.0% 0
1980	82.2% 287	15.8% 55	2.0% 7
1976	72.4% 218	26.2% 79	1.4% 4
1968	76.9% 190	21.9% 54	1.2% 3
1964	59.0% 135	40.6% 93	0.4% 1
1960	83.1% 197	13.1% 31	3.8% 9

== Culture ==
Prinsburg is known as one of Minnesota's most conservative cities. The local school district (Common School District 815) is one of two public school districts in Minnesota that do not operate a public school. There is only a private religious school (Central Minnesota Christian School) in Prinsburg.
