= George Tabor =

American politician (1862–1939)

George Washington Tabor (December 6, 1862 – August 24, 1939) was an American politician.

== Early life ==
George Tabor's father Andrew Jackson Tabor (1831–1901) moved from Jackson County, Indiana, to settle Monmouth Township, Jackson County, Iowa, with his brother. Andrew Tabor married Nancy L. Cooley in 1854, and their son George was born on December 6, 1862. George Tabor graduated from Baldwin High School in the town of Baldwin at the age of seventeen, then began working as a farmer.

== Career ==
Tabor was elected to the Iowa Senate in 1928, as a Democratic legislator for District 23, replacing Charles Steere Browne. Tabor took office on January 14, 1929, and served until January 8, 1933, when he was succeeded by Carolyn Campbell Pendray. One of Tabor's sons, Howard, later served in both houses of the Iowa General Assembly.

== Personal life ==
Tabor married Monmouth native Ella Gilmore. The couple returned to the Tabor family farm near Baldwin and raised two sons and three daughters. George Tabor later cofounded and served as president of the Baldwin Savings Bank.

== Death ==
George Tabor died at home near Baldwin on August 24, 1939.
