= Tollef Edward Moen =

American politician (1870–1950)

Tollef Edward Moen (October 10, 1870 – September 26, 1950) was an American politician.

Tollef Edward Moen was of Norwegian descent, and the first recorded child born to white settlers of Logan Township, Lyon County, Iowa, on October 10, 1870. After graduating from rural schools, Moen attended Augustana College and St. Olaf College. Moen had a fifteen-year career in the grain industry, worked for the Skewis–Moen Grain Company, and was a member of the Minneapolis Chamber of Commerce for four years. He later returned to Inwood, Iowa, as a farmer.

Moen was a member of the Lyon County Board of Supervisors from 1911 to 1919. During his tenure as a county supervisor, Moen served four years as board chairman. He subsequently served three terms as a Republican member of the Iowa House of Representatives for District 99 from January 13, 1919, to January 11, 1925. Moen returned to the Iowa General Assembly via special election in 1928, to fill a vacancy in District 49 of the Iowa Senate. He took office as a state senator on March 5, 1928, and was reelected later that year to a full four-year term in his own right. Moen ran for reelection in 1932 as a Democratic candidate, lost to Garritt Roelofs, and duly stepped down on January 8, 1933.

Moen retired to South Dakota, and died in a Beresford nursing home on September 26, 1950.
