= Baldwin, Iowa =

- City
- Location of Baldwin, Iowa
- Coordinates: 42°04′23″N 90°50′19″W
- Country: United States
- State: Iowa
- County: Jackson
- Incorporated: December 8, 1881

Area
  - Total: 0.38 sq mi (0.98 km^{2})
  - Land: 0.38 sq mi (0.98 km^{2})
  - Water: 0 sq mi (0.00 km^{2})
- Elevation: 715 ft (218 m)

Population (2020)
  - Total: 99
  - Density: 260.6/sq mi (100.61/km^{2})
- Time zone: UTC-6 (Central (CST))
  - Summer (DST): UTC-5 (CDT)
- ZIP code: 52207
- Area code: 563
- FIPS code: 19-04330
- GNIS feature ID: 2394054

Baldwin is a city in Jackson County, Iowa, United States. The population was 99 at the 2020 census.

== History ==
Baldwin was originally called Fremont. The present name is for Edward Baldwin, the original owner of the town site.

In 1910, Baldwin contained several general stores, a drug store, harness shop, meat market, hotel, saloon, restaurant, livery barn, and a barber shop.

== Geography ==
According to the United States Census Bureau, the city has a total area of 0.36 square miles (0.93 km^{2}), all land.

== Demographics ==
Historical populations
Year	Pop.	±%
1880	322	—
1890	227	−29.5%
1900	254	+11.9%
1910	229	−9.8%
1920	232	+1.3%
1930	224	−3.4%
1940	210	−6.2%
1950	208	−1.0%
1960	228	+9.6%
1970	172	−24.6%
1980	198	+15.1%
1990	137	−30.8%
2000	127	−7.3%
2010	109	−14.2%
2020	99	−9.2%
Source:"U.S. Census website". United States Census Bureau. and Iowa Data Center; Source: U.S. Decennial Census

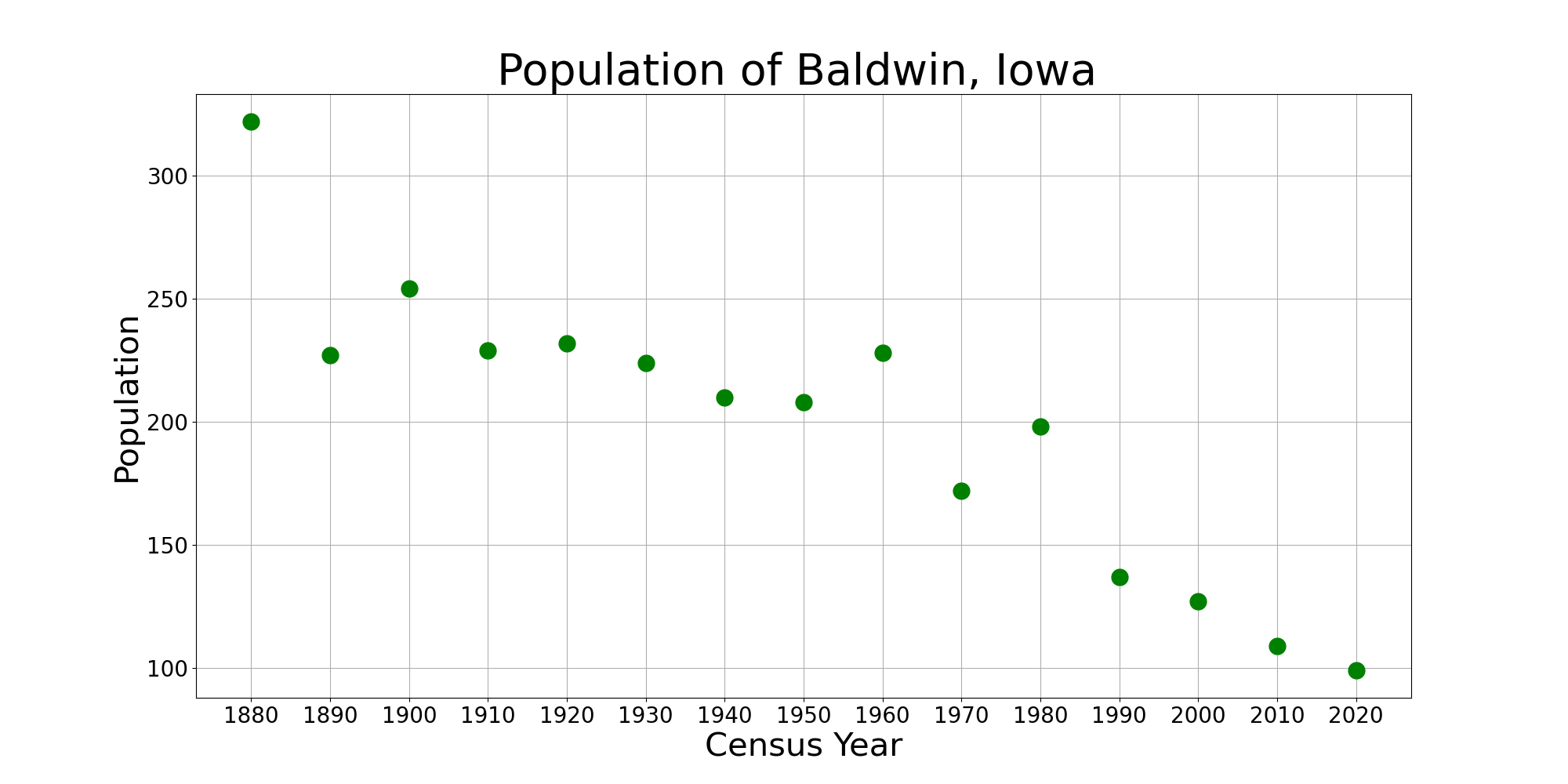
The population of Baldwin, Iowa from US census data

=== 2020 census ===
As of the census of 2020, there were 99 people, 51 households, and 33 families residing in the city. The population density was 260.6 inhabitants per square mile (100.6/km^{2}). There were 56 housing units at an average density of 147.4 per square mile (56.9/km^{2}). The racial makeup of the city was 92.9% White, 0.0% Black or African American, 0.0% Native American, 0.0% Asian, 0.0% Pacific Islander, 0.0% from other races and 7.1% from two or more races. Hispanic or Latino persons of any race comprised 1.0% of the population.

Of the 51 households, 31.4% of which had children under the age of 18 living with them, 41.2% were married couples living together, 5.9% were cohabitating couples, 15.7% had a female householder with no spouse or partner present and 37.3% had a male householder with no spouse or partner present. 35.3% of all households were non-families. 35.3% of all households were made up of individuals, 21.6% had someone living alone who was 65 years old or older.

The median age in the city was 54.5 years. 16.2% of the residents were under the age of 20; 6.1% were between the ages of 20 and 24; 21.2% were from 25 and 44; 32.3% were from 45 and 64; and 24.2% were 65 years of age or older. The gender makeup of the city was 56.6% male and 43.4% female.

=== 2010 census ===
As of the census of 2010, there were 109 people, 54 households, and 30 families living in the city. The population density was 302.8 inhabitants per square mile (116.9/km^{2}). There were 60 housing units at an average density of 166.7 per square mile (64.4/km^{2}). The racial makeup of the city was 100.0% White.

There were 54 households, of which 24.1% had children under the age of 18 living with them, 40.7% were married couples living together, 13.0% had a female householder with no husband present, 1.9% had a male householder with no wife present, and 44.4% were non-families. 38.9% of all households were made up of individuals, and 11.1% had someone living alone who was 65 years of age or older. The average household size was 2.02 and the average family size was 2.70.

The median age in the city was 43.8 years. 17.4% of residents were under the age of 18; 7.4% were between the ages of 18 and 24; 26.6% were from 25 to 44; 30.3% were from 45 to 64; and 18.3% were 65 years of age or older. The gender makeup of the city was 47.7% male and 52.3% female.

=== 2000 census ===
As of the census of 2000, there were 127 people, 57 households, and 33 families living in the city. The population density was 355.0 people per square mile (136.2 per km^{2}). There were 57 housing units at an average density of 159.3 per square mile (61.1 per km^{2}). The racial makeup of the city was 99.21% White, and 0.79% from two or more races.

There were 57 households, out of which 28.1% had children under the age of 18 living with them, 40.4% were married couples living together, 12.3% had a female householder with no husband present, and 42.1% were non-families. 36.8% of all households were made up of individuals, and 15.8% had someone living alone who was 65 years of age or older. The average household size was 2.23 and the average family size was 2.91.

In the city, the population was spread out, with 23.6% under the age of 18, 7.1% from 18 to 24, 32.3% from 25 to 44, 19.7% from 45 to 64, and 17.3% who were 65 years of age or older. The median age was 40 years. For every 100 females, there were 98.4 males. For every 100 females age 18 and over, there were 106.4 males.

The median income for a household in the city was $35,313, and the median income for a family was $43,438. Males had a median income of $32,500 versus $21,563 for females. The per capita income for the city was $15,997. There were no families and 2.3% of the population living below the poverty line, including no under eighteens and 7.1% of those over 64.

== Government ==
Baldwin has a mayor-council government.

== Education ==
The Maquoketa Community School District operates the public school system.
