= John Langfitt =

American politician (1866–1932)

John N. Langfitt (9 May 1866 – 5 August 1932) was an American politician.

Langfitt was born on 9 May 1866 in Big Rock, Iowa. His father was a Scots-Irish native of Beaver County, Pennsylvania. His mother, Caroline Gadd, was from Morrill County, Ohio, and of English descent. John Langfitt attended schools in Scott County, as well as Wilton Academy and Davenport Business College. In 1887, when he was 21, Langfitt's family moved to Adair County. Langfitt married Clara A. Martin, a Greenfield native and daughter of W. B. and Lucy E. Martin, in 1892. The couple moved to Snohomish County, Washington, and returned to Iowa in 1898, after Langfitt acquired his father's farm. Upon returning to Adair County, Langfitt became active as a board member and chairman of the local Presbyterian church.

Langfitt was affiliated with the Republican Party and elected to represent District 29 of the Iowa House of Representatives in 1916 and 1918. He completed his second term as a state representative in 1921, and stepped down from public office. In August 1924, Langfitt's wife died. He was elected to the Iowa Senate for District 16 later that year. He won reelection as state senator in 1928, but did not finish his second term, as he died in office on 5 August 1932.
