= Maquoketa, Iowa =

- City
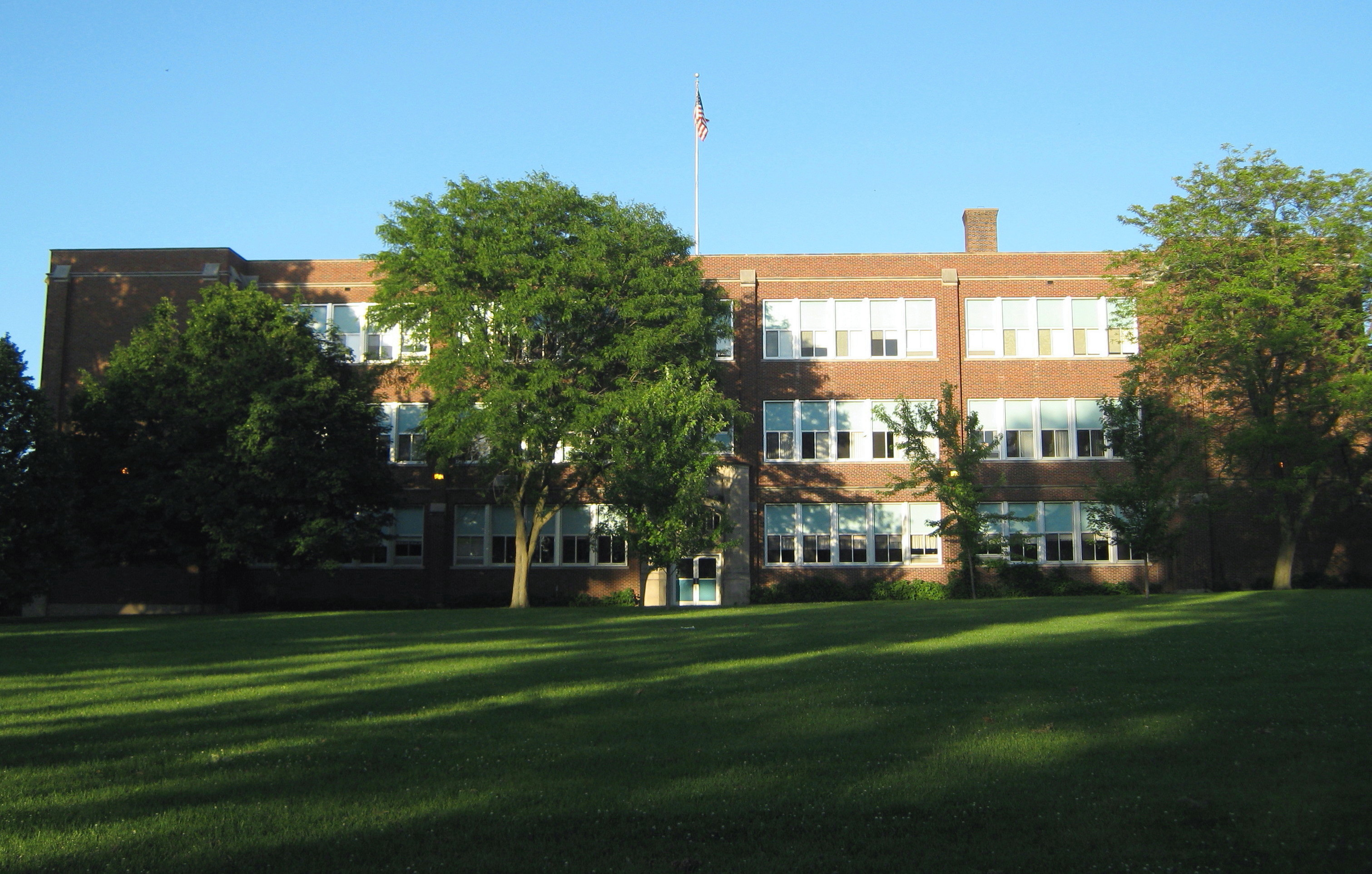
- Maquoketa Middle School
- Nickname: Timber City
- Motto: One of a Kind
- Location of Maquoketa, Iowa
- Coordinates: 42°03′42″N 90°39′54″W
- Country: United States
- State: Iowa
- Counties: Jackson
- Incorporated: January 27, 1857

Government
  - Mayor: Tom Messerli

Area
  - Total: 4.54 sq mi (11.76 km^{2})
  - Land: 4.52 sq mi (11.70 km^{2})
  - Water: 0.027 sq mi (0.07 km^{2})
- Elevation: 715 ft (218 m)

Population (2020)
  - Total: 6,128
  - Density: 1,356.6/sq mi (523.78/km^{2})
- Time zone: UTC-6 (Central (CST))
  - Summer (DST): UTC-5 (CDT)
- ZIP code: 52060
- Area code: 563
- FIPS code: 19-49215
- GNIS feature ID: 2395848
- Website: www.maquoketaia.com

Maquoketa (/məˈkoʊkɪtə/) is a city in Jackson County, Iowa, United States. Located on the Maquoketa River, it is the county seat of Jackson County. The population was 6,128 at the 2020 census.

U.S. Route 61 adjoins the city, which therefore hosts traffic between Dubuque and the Quad Cities. Iowa Highways 62 and 64 also pass through the city. Maquoketa Caves State Park is located a few miles northwest of Maquoketa.

== History ==
John E. Goodenow, the inaugural settler in the region, arrived in what is now recognized as Maquoketa in 1838. He established his residence on the present-day southeast corner of Main and Platt streets, erecting a cabin in that vicinity. By 1840, Zalmon Livermore had acquired the quarter section on the northeast corner of this intersection, while Alonzo Spaulding claimed the northwest corner, and John Shaw occupied the southwest corner. The center of today's business district was originally the epicenter of this early settlement, known at the time as Springfield. The town's growth was propelled by two key factors: its strategic location at the intersection of the Davenport-to-Dubuque mail and stage route, as well as its proximity to the path used by pioneers traveling from Chicago to the west. Additionally, the abundance of water in the area facilitated the development of industries along the North and South Forks of the Maquoketa River.

Around 1840, the mail route between Davenport and Dubuque was established through Springfield, located on what is now Main Street in Maquoketa. Consequently, the post office moved to Springfield, with John Goodenow appointed as postmaster. In 1844, due to multiple towns named Springfield in the area, the town was renamed Maquoketa, after the Maquoketa River. The river's name derives from Maquaw-Autaw, which means "Bear River" in Meskwaki.

In 1853, Maquoketa was officially incorporated as a city. As other nearby towns declined, Maquoketa emerged as the primary center of commerce. In 1843, early settlers began dividing their land into lots informally, resulting in the irregular lot sizes seen in the modern business district. With the increasing settlement and the importance of the mail route, demand for lodging grew. In 1849, John Goodenow built the Goodenow House, the town's first hotel, near Main and Platt streets, drawing visitors and showcasing Maquoketa's potential for growth.

The Davenport and St. Paul Railroad was extended to Maquoketa in 1870 prompting growth. The county seat was transferred from Andrew to Maquoketa in 1873.

Maquoketa experienced a period of economic growth during the late 19th century, primarily due to its location near valuable natural resources such as timber, limestone, and fertile farmland. As the town prospered, wealthy residents sought to display their affluence through the construction of grand homes many of which are still extant within the community.

The onset of the First World War in 1917 significantly affected the commercial district. Numerous businesses experienced the loss of young male employees, either through voluntary enlistment or compulsory military service. Upon the war's conclusion in 1918, returning soldiers were ceremoniously welcomed home with parades along Main Street.

Following the stock market crash of 1929, the Great Depression brought a halt to construction activity in the commercial district. The American Savings Bank closed its doors, leading to the renovation of its building at 100 S. Main Street in 1935. The revamped structure housed a National Tea Company grocery store on the ground floor and served as meeting space for the American Legion above. This renovation, which included the removal of classical pilasters and the installation of modern storefront materials, signaled a shift in the district's architectural landscape. Despite these changes, Maquoketa experienced relatively moderate economic effects compared to other regions, likely due to its strategic location at the intersection of two commercial highways.

After World War II, Maquoketa, Iowa experienced a surge in residential construction, particularly on the west side of town. Many of these homes were constructed on old farmland, This rapid suburbanization not only met the housing needs of the time but also contributed to the town's post-war growth and prosperity.

In 1950, Maquoketa, Iowa, reached a significant milestone in its healthcare infrastructure by constructing its first public hospital. Prior to this development, the town had relied on a patchwork of privately-run small hospitals to meet the healthcare needs of its residents. These small hospitals, while providing essential services, often faced limitations in terms of capacity, resources, and accessibility.

Maquoketa experienced another pivotal moment with the relocation of the Clinton Machine Company to the city in 1950. Don Thomas spearheaded this move, establishing the company on a 12-acre plot within Maquoketa, strategically leveraging a rail spur for transportation. Clinton Engines, a division of the company, became a powerhouse, producing approximately 18 million small engines and ranking as the 10th largest employer in Iowa.

In the 1960s, Maquoketa, Iowa witnessed the emergence of a new commercial district. Main Street, formerly part of US Highway 61, underwent a significant transformation with the planning and construction of a four-lane highway bypass starting in the late 1960s. As the bypass project progressed, many businesses along Main Street made plans to relocate to the west side of town in anticipation of increased automobile traffic from the highway. Following the opening of the Highway 61 bypass in 1967, there was a notable shift in commercial activity away from Main Street towards the new commercial district. Despite this disinvestment in the Main Street area, property owners remained committed to maintaining the integrity of the existing buildings, ensuring they remained in good repair.

During the 1980s, many towns in Jackson County, Iowa, faced significant challenges, particularly due to the farm crisis that devastated rural communities across the region. While the county as a whole experienced population declines and economic hardships, Maquoketa saw only minor decreases in its population. Nevertheless, the farm crisis did have negative repercussions for Maquoketa, impacting local agricultural businesses and contributing to a sense of economic uncertainty within the community.

In 1999 the town was bypassed by the now four lane Highway Sixty-One, further diverting traffic away from the downtown area. This highway bypass had detrimental effects on Maquoketa's economy, as it resulted in decreased traffic flow through the town center, affecting local businesses that relied on passing trade. Additionally, the bypass diminished Maquoketa's visibility and accessibility, further exacerbating economic challenges for the community. Despite these setbacks, Maquoketa persisted in its efforts to adapt and evolve, seeking new avenues for economic growth and community development in the face of adversity.

The early 2000s posed significant economic challenges for Maquoketa, Iowa, exacerbating the struggles of its downtown district. Already grappling with vacant storefronts and declining economic activity, the town faced further hardship during this period including the closure of the Clinton Engines Company. However, the most devastating blow came on January 19, 2008, when a large portion of the downtown area, already struggling, succumbed to a devastating fire. While tragic, this event served as a catalyst for change, sparking renewed efforts to revitalize the downtown district and enhance the overall community.

Beginning in the 2010s, Maquoketa experienced a wave of revitalization, marked by the attraction of new businesses, significant infrastructure investments, and a renewed focus on preserving its historic downtown district.

One notable development was the construction of a new hospital in 2019, enhancing healthcare services for residents. Additionally, Maquoketa embarked on ambitious housing initiatives, including the construction of new housing developments to meet the growing demand for residential properties.

== Demographics ==
Historical population
Census	Pop.	Note	%±
1850	168		—
1860	1,090		548.8%
1870	1,756		61.1%
1880	2,467		40.5%
1890	3,077		24.7%
1900	3,777		22.7%
1910	3,570		−5.5%
1920	3,626		1.6%
1930	3,595		−0.9%
1940	4,076		13.4%
1950	4,307		5.7%
1960	5,909		37.2%
1970	5,677		−3.9%
1980	6,313		11.2%
1990	6,130		−2.9%
2000	6,112		−0.3%
2010	6,141		0.5%
2020	6,128		−0.2%
Iowa Data Center

=== 2020 census ===
As of the 2020 census, there were 6,128 people, 2,674 households, and 1,536 families residing in the city. The population density was 1,356.6 inhabitants per square mile (523.8/km^{2}). The median age was 41.3 years. 22.9% of residents were under the age of 18 and 21.0% were 65 years of age or older. For every 100 females there were 93.3 males, and for every 100 females age 18 and over there were 89.6 males age 18 and over.

99.0% of residents lived in urban areas, while 1.0% lived in rural areas.

Of the 2,674 households, 25.8% had children under the age of 18 living with them. Of all households, 40.4% were married-couple households, 8.2% were cohabiting couple households, 31.5% had a female householder with no spouse or partner present, and 19.9% had a male householder with no spouse or partner present. 42.6% of households were non-families. 37.4% of all households were made up of individuals, and 18.4% had someone living alone who was 65 years of age or older.

There were 2,888 housing units at an average density of 639.3 per square mile (246.8/km^{2}). Of all housing units, 7.4% were vacant. The homeowner vacancy rate was 0.8% and the rental vacancy rate was 6.7%.

Racial composition as of the 2020 census
Race	Number	Percent
White	5,552	90.6%
Black or African American	91	1.5%
American Indian and Alaska Native	22	0.4%
Asian	31	0.5%
Native Hawaiian and Other Pacific Islander	183	3.0%
Some other race	35	0.6%
Two or more races	214	3.5%
Hispanic or Latino (of any race)	105	1.7%

=== 2010 census ===
As of the census of 2010, there were 6,141 people, 2,655 households, and 1,612 families residing in the city. The population density was 1,418.2 inhabitants per square mile (547.6/km^{2}). There were 2,856 housing units at an average density of 659.6 per square mile (254.7/km^{2}). The racial makeup of the city was 95.0% White, 0.7% African American, 0.4% Native American, 0.3% Asian, 1.3% Pacific Islander, 0.6% from other races, and 1.7% from two or more races. Hispanic or Latino of any race were 1.8% of the population.

There were 2,655 households, of which 29.9% had children under the age of 18 living with them, 42.7% were married couples living together, 13.5% had a female householder with no husband present, 4.5% had a male householder with no wife present, and 39.3% were non-families. 34.5% of all households were made up of individuals, and 16.3% had someone living alone who was 65 years of age or older. The average household size was 2.26 and the average family size was 2.88.

The median age in the city was 41 years. 24.4% of residents were under the age of 18; 7.2% were between the ages of 18 and 24; 23.5% were from 25 to 44; 25.7% were from 45 to 64; and 19.3% were 65 years of age or older. The gender makeup of the city was 47.2% male and 52.8% female.

=== 2000 census ===
As of the census of 2000, there were 6,112 people, 2,614 households, and 1,599 families residing in the city. The population density was 1,773.3 inhabitants per square mile (684.7/km^{2}). There were 2,797 housing units at an average density of 811.5 per square mile (313.3/km^{2}). The racial makeup of the city was 98.10% White, 0.16% African American, 0.21% Native American, 0.11% Asian, 0.34% Pacific Islander, 0.34% from other races, and 0.72% from two or more races. Hispanic or Latino of any race were 0.98% of the population.

There were 2,614 households, out of which 29.1% had children under the age of 18 living with them, 46.4% were married couples living together, 11.1% had a female householder with no husband present, and 38.8% were non-families. 34.3% of all households were made up of individuals, and 18.1% had someone living alone who was 65 years of age or older. The average household size was 2.26 and the average family size was 2.90.

Age spread: 24.4% under the age of 18, 8.3% from 18 to 24, 25.2% from 25 to 44, 20.6% from 45 to 64, and 21.4% who were 65 years of age or older. The median age was 40 years. For every 100 females, there were 87.8 males. For every 100 females age 18 and over, there were 81.0 males.

The median income for a household in the city was $28,984, and the median income for a family was $36,705. Males had a median income of $25,819 versus $19,421 for females. The per capita income for the city was $16,360. About 9.1% of families and 12.3% of the population were below the poverty line, including 18.6% of those under age 18 and 8.6% of those age 65 or over.

== Geography ==
Maquoketa is located primarily in Jackson County.

According to the United States Census Bureau, the city has a total area of 4.37 square miles (11.32 km^{2}), of which 4.33 square miles (11.21 km^{2}) is land and 0.04 square miles (0.10 km^{2}) is water.

=== Climate ===
Climate data for Maquoketa, Iowa, 1991–2020 normals, extremes 1896–present
Month	Jan	Feb	Mar	Apr	May	Jun	Jul	Aug	Sep	Oct	Nov	Dec	Year
Record high °F (°C)	62 (17)	71 (22)	85 (29)	93 (34)	105 (41)	104 (40)	108 (42)	108 (42)	102 (39)	94 (34)	80 (27)	68 (20)	108 (42)
Mean maximum °F (°C)	48.0 (8.9)	52.9 (11.6)	68.0 (20.0)	80.1 (26.7)	87.7 (30.9)	91.7 (33.2)	92.4 (33.6)	90.7 (32.6)	89.1 (31.7)	83.4 (28.6)	66.8 (19.3)	52.4 (11.3)	94.1 (34.5)
Mean daily maximum °F (°C)	26.7 (−2.9)	31.2 (−0.4)	44.5 (6.9)	58.6 (14.8)	70.3 (21.3)	79.4 (26.3)	82.2 (27.9)	80.6 (27.0)	74.8 (23.8)	61.7 (16.5)	46.1 (7.8)	32.5 (0.3)	57.4 (14.1)
Daily mean °F (°C)	19.0 (−7.2)	23.1 (−4.9)	35.5 (1.9)	47.8 (8.8)	59.8 (15.4)	69.6 (20.9)	72.5 (22.5)	70.6 (21.4)	63.2 (17.3)	50.7 (10.4)	37.2 (2.9)	25.3 (−3.7)	47.9 (8.8)
Mean daily minimum °F (°C)	11.4 (−11.4)	15.1 (−9.4)	26.4 (−3.1)	37.0 (2.8)	49.3 (9.6)	59.8 (15.4)	62.9 (17.2)	60.6 (15.9)	51.6 (10.9)	39.8 (4.3)	28.3 (−2.1)	18.0 (−7.8)	38.4 (3.5)
Mean minimum °F (°C)	−13.4 (−25.2)	−7.6 (−22.0)	4.4 (−15.3)	22.1 (−5.5)	33.2 (0.7)	45.9 (7.7)	51.0 (10.6)	49.6 (9.8)	36.1 (2.3)	23.6 (−4.7)	11.1 (−11.6)	−3.9 (−19.9)	−17.5 (−27.5)
Record low °F (°C)	−37 (−38)	−34 (−37)	−21 (−29)	5 (−15)	21 (−6)	33 (1)	39 (4)	34 (1)	17 (−8)	2 (−17)	−8 (−22)	−27 (−33)	−37 (−38)
Average precipitation inches (mm)	1.32 (34)	1.65 (42)	2.22 (56)	3.44 (87)	4.21 (107)	5.09 (129)	4.15 (105)	4.18 (106)	3.64 (92)	2.93 (74)	2.08 (53)	1.78 (45)	36.69 (930)
Average snowfall inches (cm)	8.4 (21)	8.0 (20)	3.8 (9.7)	0.9 (2.3)	0.1 (0.25)	0.0 (0.0)	0.0 (0.0)	0.0 (0.0)	0.0 (0.0)	0.3 (0.76)	1.7 (4.3)	7.1 (18)	30.3 (76.31)
Average precipitation days (≥ 0.01 in)	7.3	7.3	8.8	10.9	11.9	11.3	9.4	8.9	8.4	9.2	7.3	8.6	109.3
Average snowy days (≥ 0.1 in)	5.6	4.9	2.7	0.6	0.0	0.0	0.0	0.0	0.0	0.2	1.3	5.4	20.7
Source 1: NOAA
Source 2: National Weather Service

== Government ==
Maquoketa is governed by the Mayor with city council form of government, with several departments, boards, and commissions.

The council votes on and passes motions, resolutions and ordinances. Resolutions are statements of policy and ordinances are the laws of the city. The votes of each council member are recorded in the minutes of the meeting. The council also approves expenditures and the budget, contracts, city policies and zoning changes.

Mayor

The mayor is Tom Messerli. The mayor is the city's chief executive officer and presides over council meetings.

Past Mayors from 1853 to 2009
- 1853–1855 John E Goodenow
- 1855–1856 Isaiah K Millard
- 1856–1857 Rodger Pierre
- 1857–1857 Zalmon Livermore
- 1857–1858 Isaiah K Millard
- 1858–1859 Albert Harrison
- 1859–1862 Seneca S Germond
- 1862–1864 Daniel S Haight
- 1864–1866 Thomas E Cannell
- 1866–1867 Col. Joseph J Woods
- 1867–1868 Dr. John H Allen
- 1868–1869 Gary Jacobson
- 1869–1871 Dr. John H Allen
- 1871–1872 Benjamin A Spencer
- 1872–1873 Franklin Deskly
- 1873–1874 Thomas E Cannell
- 1874–1875 Henry Thompson
- 1875–1876 Dudley M Hubbell
- 1876–1878 William M Stephens
- 1878–1879 Tom Goodenow
- 1879–1881 Pearce Mitchell
- 1881–1882 Thomas E Cannell
- 1882–1884 Caleb M Sanborn
- 1884–1886 Levi Keck
- 1886–1887 Thomas E Cannell
- 1887–1888 Caleb M Sanborn
- 1888–1891 Matthew S Dunn
- 1891–1892 Dr. Abraham B Dobson
- 1892–1892 Dr. Amos S Hodge
- 1892–1893 Harold P Harvey
- 1893–1897 William M Stephens
- 1897–1899 Caleb M Sanborn
- 1899–1903 William M Stephens
- 1903–1904 Harold P Harvey
- 1904–1905 Frank D Kelsey
- 1905–1909 Fred C Gregory
- 1909–1917 Frederick W Myatt
- 1917–1921 William C Morden, Jr.
- 1921–1931 Dr. Fred J Swift, Sr.
- 1931–1932 John B Harrison
- 1932–1937 Stewart K Peake
- 1937–1938 William J Pendray
- 1938–1945 LeRoy C Schroeder
- 1945–1951 Arthur W Sokol
- 1951–1953 Lanvil Moler
- 1953–1954 Harold D Keeley
- 1954–1958 Benhart Jacobsen
- 1958–1961 Ronald T Cahill
- 1961–1964 Larry Schulte
- 1964–1970 Benhart Jacobsen
- 1970–1972 Samuel L. Johnson
- 1972–1974 Benhart Jacobsen
- 1974–1976 Edward Myatt
- 1974–1976 Barbara A Wright [pro tem]
- 1976–1977 Larry Schulte
- 1977–1979 Lawrence P Despeghel
- 1979–1982 Howard Elkins
- 1982–1984 Alvin F Barker
- 1984–1989 Leighton Hepker
- 1990–1991 Clifton Lamborn
- 1992–1993 James J Hohnecker
- 1994–1995 Clifton Lamborn
- 1995–2001 Jack R Rosenberg
- 2002–2009 Tom Messerli

Current Mayor: Tom Messerli

City Council

The city council members are (listed by seniority):

- Joshua Collister (2010)
- Kevin Kuhlman (2015)
- Mark Lyon (2017)
- Jacob Baker (2018)
- Jessica Kean (2018)
- Erica Barker (2018)
- Ronald Horan Jr. (2018)

City Manager

Maquoketa's day-to-day operations are run by the city manager, Gerald Smith.

== Education ==
=== Public schools ===
The Maquoketa Community School District, in partnership with the community, oversees the public school system of education for the city of Maquoketa and the surrounding area.

The Maquoketa High School, home of the Cardinals, has enrollment of approximately 620 students, grades 9 through 12, with a staff of over 50 educators and administrators.

The Maquoketa Middle School is the oldest school building in Maquoketa due to it being built in 1922 after the previous structure burned down, formally a home to a junior high, high school and junior college. The school has approximately 375 students, grades 6 through 8, with a staff of over 60 educators and administrators.

Briggs Elementary School, built in 1954, is named after Ansel Briggs, the first Governor of Iowa, who was an early settler in Jackson County. The school has approximately 300 students, grades 3 through 5, with a staff of 35 educators and administrators.

Cardinal Elementary School, built in 1974, started as a school for grades 1 through 6. Gradual changes were made to the building and the grade levels taught. The decision to teach only kindergarten through 2nd grade was implemented at Cardinal in May 2002. The school has a staff of 37 educators and administrators.

=== Private ===
Sacred Heart Elementary School is a Catholic school teaching preschool through the sixth grade. The current school enrollment (see references) has 132 students and 20 staff.

=== Preschools ===
The Little Shepherd Preschool operates in the lower levels of the First Lutheran Church of Maquoketa.

Sunshine Preschool and Daycare is a nonprofit organization started in 1973. All children age 6 months up to 12 years of age including those with disabilities are accepted. Currently (see references) there are 145 children with 30 staff.

=== College ===
Clinton Community College added a Maquoketa campus right next to the Maquoketa High School. The 11,000 square foot facility opened in 2009 and offers associate degrees and non-credit training. They also offer classes to high school students to supplement their high school education.

== Attractions ==
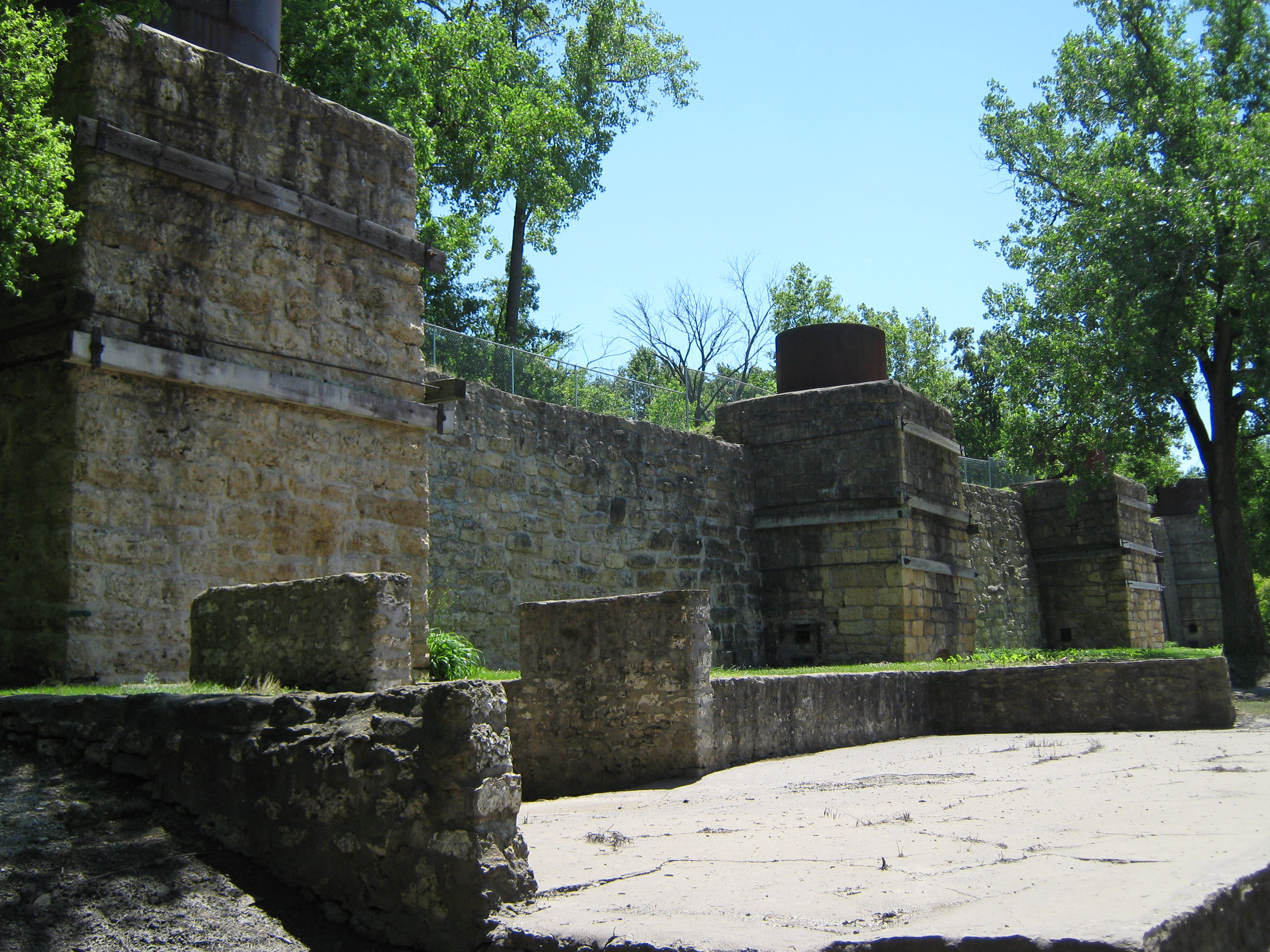
Hurstville Lime Kilns

- Maquoketa Caves State Park
- Hurstville Lime Kilns, north of Maquoketa
- Jackson County Iowa Historical Society
- Clinton Engines Museum
- 61 Drive-in theater
- Camp Shalom Inc.
- The town also holds host to a historic district containing many great examples of Victorian architecture.

Despite its size, the town also attracts many presidential candidates. 2008 Democratic presidential candidate Barack Obama visited the town twice during his campaign and again while president on August 16, 2011. The Old City Hall Gallery displays the oil paintings of International-known Maquoketa artist Rose Frantzen, whose exhibit "Portrait of Maquoketa", the oil paintings of 180 residents of Maquoketa, was once on display at the Smithsonian National Portrait Gallery in Washington, DC. It is now housed in the permanent collection of the Figge Art Museum in Davenport, Iowa.

== Notable people ==
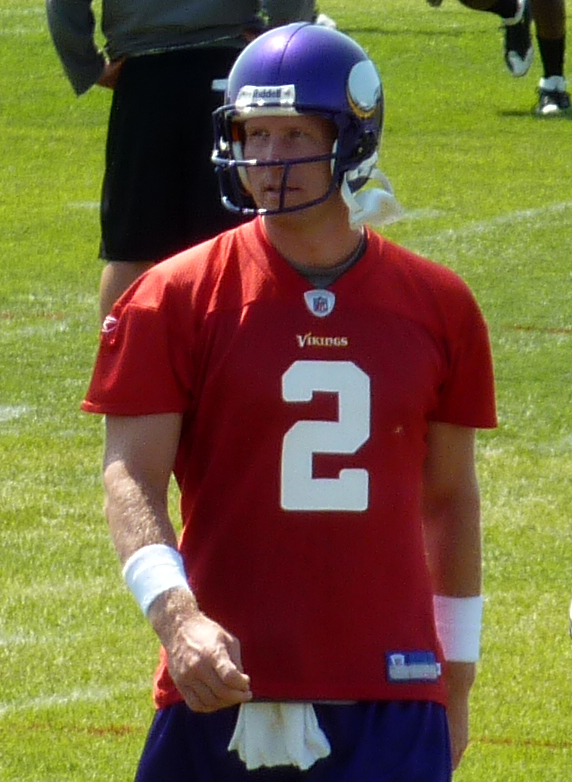
Sage Rosenfels

- Archie Atherton, parachutist
- Norris Brown, Senator from Nebraska
- Craig Callahan, professional basketball player
- James H. Cartwright, Illinois Supreme Court justice
- Betty Francis, All-American Girls Professional Baseball League player
- John Elliot Goodenow, politician and founder of the town
- Herbert E. Hitchcock, Senator from South Dakota
- Alfred Hurst, politician and businessman
- Charles Wycliffe Joiner, US federal judge
- Matthew Luckiesh, physicist
- Junius Ralph Magee, former Methodist bishop
- Eben Martin, former US Representative
- Robert A. Millikan, Nobel Prize laureate
- Joseph Otting, Businessman and 31st Comptroller of the Currency
- Sage Rosenfels, former quarterback in the NFL
- George Homer Ryan, former Governor of Illinois
- William Welch, originated the printing of high school diplomas
