= Arthur Gray Leonard =

American politician

Arthur Gray Leonard (born 14 September 1870) was an American farmer and politician.

Leonard was born on a farm in Taylor County, Iowa. He later owned the farm adjacent to his parents' land and raised Shropshire sheep with relatives. Leonard married Esther Coulter in February 1893. At the time of Leonard's tenure in the Iowa General Assembly, the couple had two sons and one daughter. Leonard was affiliated with the Republican Party. Between 1923 and 1927, he was a two-term member of the Iowa House of Representatives for District 8. Leonard then served in the Iowa Senate from 1929 to 1932, for District 6.
