= John Henry Hager (Iowa politician) =

American politician (1871–1952)

John Henry Hager (30 August 1871 – 10 June 1952) was an American politician from Iowa.

John Henry Hager was one of twelve children raised by German immigrant Simon Frederick Hager and his wife. Born on 30 August 1871, in Ludlow Township, Allamakee County, Iowa, Hager attended the Breckenridge Preparatory and Business Institute in Decorah. He served as quartermaster sergeant in I Company of the 49th Iowa Volunteer Infantry during the Spanish–American War. Hager started selling farm equipment in 1895. By 1908, his dealership was selling Buick vehicles. Hager was elected to the Iowa House of Representatives for the first time in 1924 as a Republican from District 90. He won reelection in 1926, then served a single term on the Iowa Senate for District 40. Hager was married to Grace Falby, a native of Burlington, Vermont, from 14 June 1905 to his death in Waukon, Iowa on 10 June 1952. Falby died in 1959.
