= Calamus–Wheatland High School =

Public secondary school in Wheatland, Iowa, United States

Coordinates: 41.837670255850426°N 90.83870285163854°W

Location
- 110 East Park Road; Wheatland, Iowa 52777; USA

Information
- Type: Public Secondary
- Established: 1986
- School district: Calamus–Wheatland Community School District
- Superintendent: Lonnie Luepker
- Principal: Andrea Howard
- Teaching staff: 18.20 (FTE)
- Grades: 7–12
- Enrollment: 182 (2024-2025)
- Student to teacher ratio: 10.00
- Colors: Navy blue, Silver
- Athletics conference: Tri-Rivers Conference
- Mascot: Warrior
- Website: www.cal-wheat.k12.ia.us

Calamus–Wheatland High School is a rural public, four-year high school located in Wheatland, Iowa. The school is part of the Calamus–Wheatland Community School District.

Located approximately one mile north of U.S. Highway 30 in Wheatland, Calamus–Wheatland High School draws students from several communities in western and southwestern Clinton County, including Calamus, Wheatland and Toronto; the district also includes a small portion of northwestern Scott County, drawing students from the unincorporated community of Big Rock and rural areas north and west of Dixon.

Calamus–Wheatland came into being in 1990, the result of a merger of the former Calamus and Wheatland school districts. Toronto had earlier been a separate school district, and was incorporated into Wheatland sometime in the early 1960s.

== Athletics ==
Calamus–Wheatland sports teams are known as the Warriors; their uniforms display the school's colors of navy blue and silver.

The school fields athletic teams in 12 sports, including:

- Summer: baseball and softball.
- Fall: football, volleyball, boys' cross country and girls' cross country.
  - Boys' cross country - 1996 Class 1A State Champions
  - Girls' cross country - 1998 Class 1A State Champions
- Winter: boys' basketball, girls' basketball, and cheerleading.
- Spring: boys' track and field, girls' track and field, boys' golf and girls' golf.

As the school does not have its own soccer program, athletes wanting to play participate in a cooperative program with Central DeWitt High School. The school also has a competitive dance team.

Calamus–Wheatland is classified as a 1A school (Iowa's smallest schools enrollment tier), according to the Iowa High School Athletic Association and Iowa Girls High School Athletic Union. The school is a member of the thirteen-team Tri-Rivers Conference, which comprises schools from rural communities in Clinton, Jackson, Jones, Buchanan, Delaware, and Linn counties. The men's varsity basketball team finished second in the 2010 state basketball tournament, falling to the Siouxland Conference's Rock Valley High School.

== See also ==
- List of high schools in Iowa
