= Calamus, Iowa =

- City
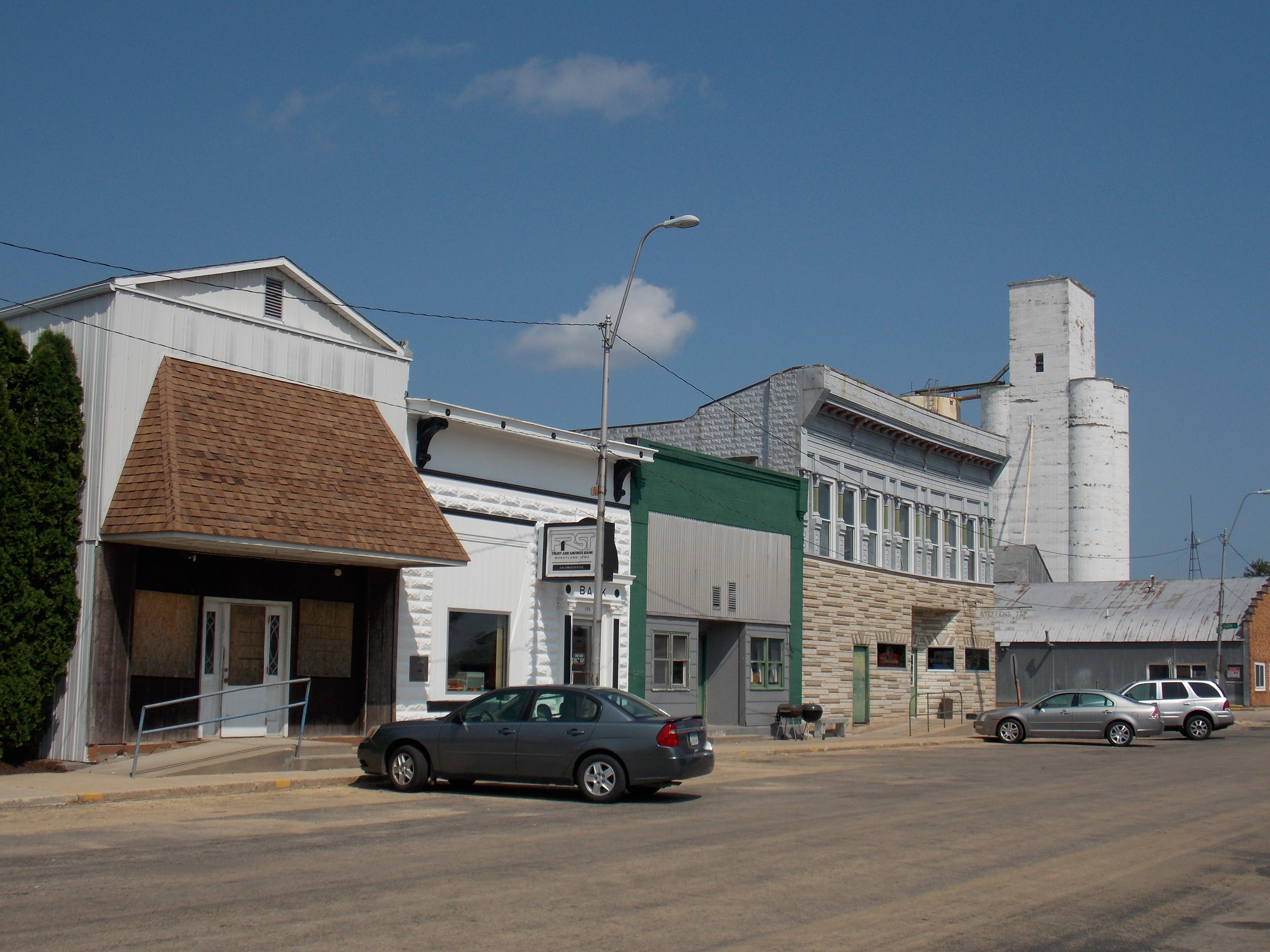
- Buildings in the business district in Calamus, Iowa
- Motto: A Community that Cares
- Location of Calamus, Iowa
- Coordinates: 41°49′36″N 90°45′35″W
- Country: United States
- State: Iowa
- County: Clinton
- Established: 1860

Government
  - Type: Mayor–council

Area
  - Total: 0.49 sq mi (1.28 km^{2})
  - Land: 0.49 sq mi (1.28 km^{2})
  - Water: 0 sq mi (0.00 km^{2})
- Elevation: 699 ft (213 m)

Population (2020)
  - Total: 356
  - Density: 721.6/sq mi (278.62/km^{2})
- Time zone: UTC-6 (Central (CST))
  - Summer (DST): UTC-5 (CDT)
- ZIP code: 52729
- Area code: 563
- FIPS code: 19-09820
- GNIS feature ID: 2393492
- Website: www.calamusia.org

Calamus (/ˈkæləməs/) is a small city in Clinton County, Iowa, United States, located on the historical Lincoln Highway, which was the first transcontinental highway for automobiles across the U.S.. Calamus is the only town in Olive Township and had a population of 356 at the 2020 census, which was a 9.6% decrease from 2000. Calamus was named after Calamus Creek, which received its name from the great quantities of sweet flag growing in it, derived from the botanical name Acorus calamus, commonly called Sweet Flag or Calamus.

== History ==
=== Early settlement ===
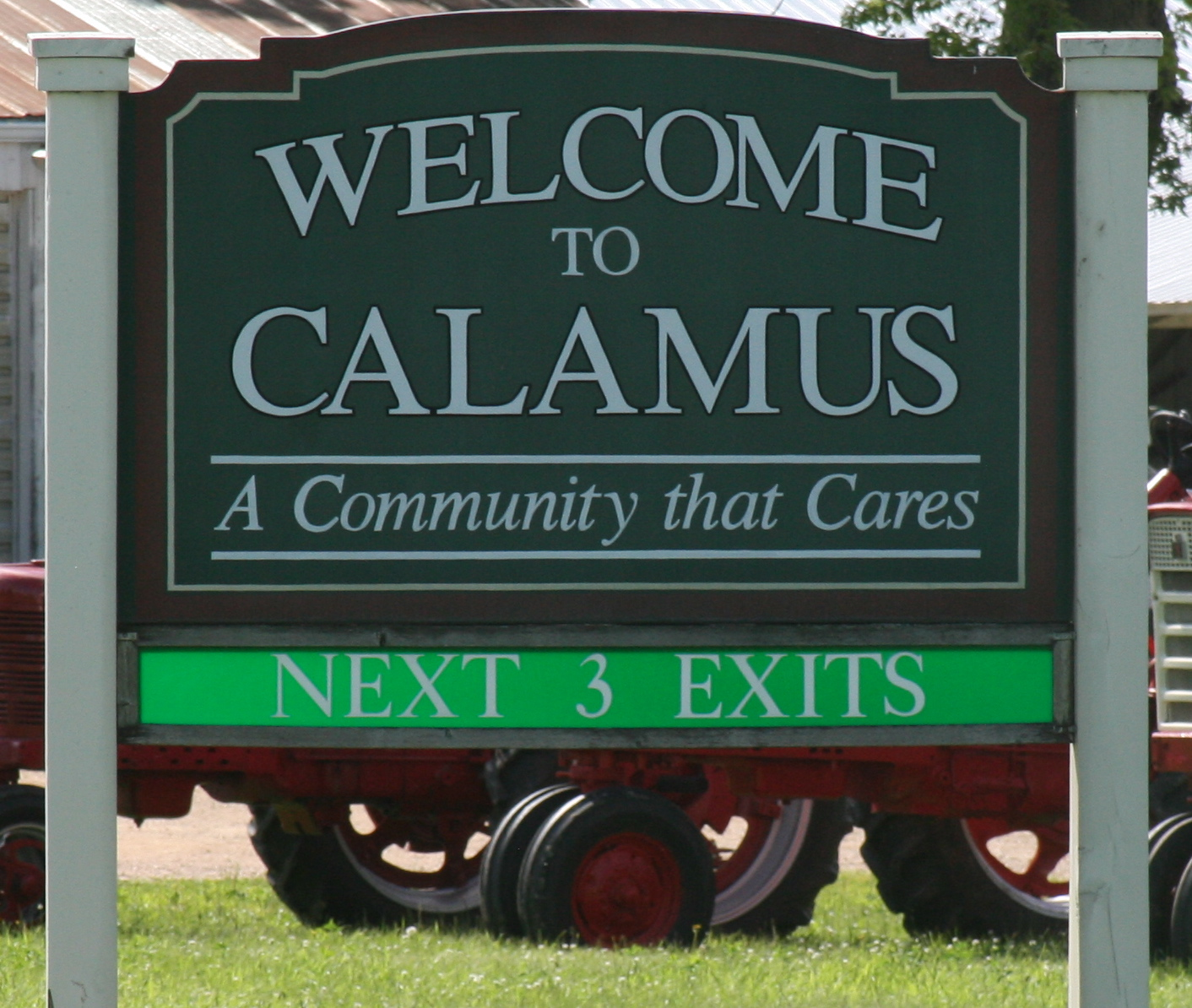
Welcome Sign

In July 1858 the first railroad was built west from Clinton to Clarence, Iowa. It was called the Chicago, Iowa and Nebraska Railroad, later changed to Chicago Northwestern Railroad Co.. In the same year, Joseph D. Fegan was deputized to go to the cross roads of the Stage Coach Lines and the Indian Trails at Syracuse, which had a small stove and a saloon, to establish a post office in 1858. No one could suggest a name and Mr. Fegan asked "Is there no creek or anything?" "Yes, Calamus Creek." "Then let it be Calamus." Due to the large hazardous swamps, the Post Office and railway station were moved to a more favorable location in what is now the town of Calamus.

The present day location of Calamus, a small village on the Union Pacific Railway, was platted in 1860 by R. S. Dickinson, who owned the land on the north side of the railroad, and Col. Milo Smith, who owned that on the south. James Keith opened the first store here containing a small stock of groceries and accessories, located about where the present day Faith Lutheran Church stands. In 1861, R. S. Dickinson and his son A. L. built the first general store, and opened a large and complete stock of general merchandise, and engaged in grain-buying. Two or three years later, another small store was opened by R. E. Houck.

Thomas Franklin Butterfield built the first grain elevator, to care for the grain which had previously been hauled to Davenport. In 1868, two elevators had a thriving business and there were four general stores.

The first hotel was built in the early 1860s and burned down in 1912. This building was located on the S.W. corner of 2nd and Railroad Streets and the first landlord was William Wick. Later the "Commercial Hotel" was erected on 2nd St. on the north half of Lot 6. This hotel had a livery stable and A.H. Danforth was the proprietor.

The town was replatted October 9, 1865, by Milo Smith and R. S. and Emily Dickinson.

Calamus was legally incorporated in 1876 [October 6, 1875.], and E. F. Owens was elected the first Mayor. His successors have been F. Buck, in 1877, and J. C. Bowman, in 1878 and 1879. The city limits were enlarged in 1913.

=== Civil War ===
The vote in the Olive Township in 1860 was 149, and before the draft for the Civil War was ordered, 79 men volunteered into the Union Army. This was the 'banner' township of Iowa regarding enlistments in proportion to the population. The last survivor of the Civil War was Jacob W. Liebler, who died in 1941.

== Geography ==
Calamus is located in Olive Township.

According to the United States Census Bureau, the city has a total area of 0.48 square miles (1.24 km^{2}), all land.

=== Major highways ===
- US 30

=== Adjacent cities ===
- Lost Nation (north)
- Grand Mound (east)
- Buena Vista (south), abandoned in 1914
- Dixon (south), across the Wapsipinicon River
- Wheatland (west), across the Wapsipinicon River

== Demographics ==
Historical populations
Year	Pop.	±%
1880	163	—
1890	216	+32.5%
1900	287	+32.9%
1910	270	−5.9%
1920	399	+47.8%
1930	374	−6.3%
1940	384	+2.7%
1950	381	−0.8%
1960	435	+14.2%
1970	396	−9.0%
1980	452	+14.1%
1990	379	−16.2%
2000	394	+4.0%
2010	439	+11.4%
2020	356	−18.9%
Source:"U.S. Census website". United States Census Bureau. and Iowa Data Center; Source: U.S. Decennial Census

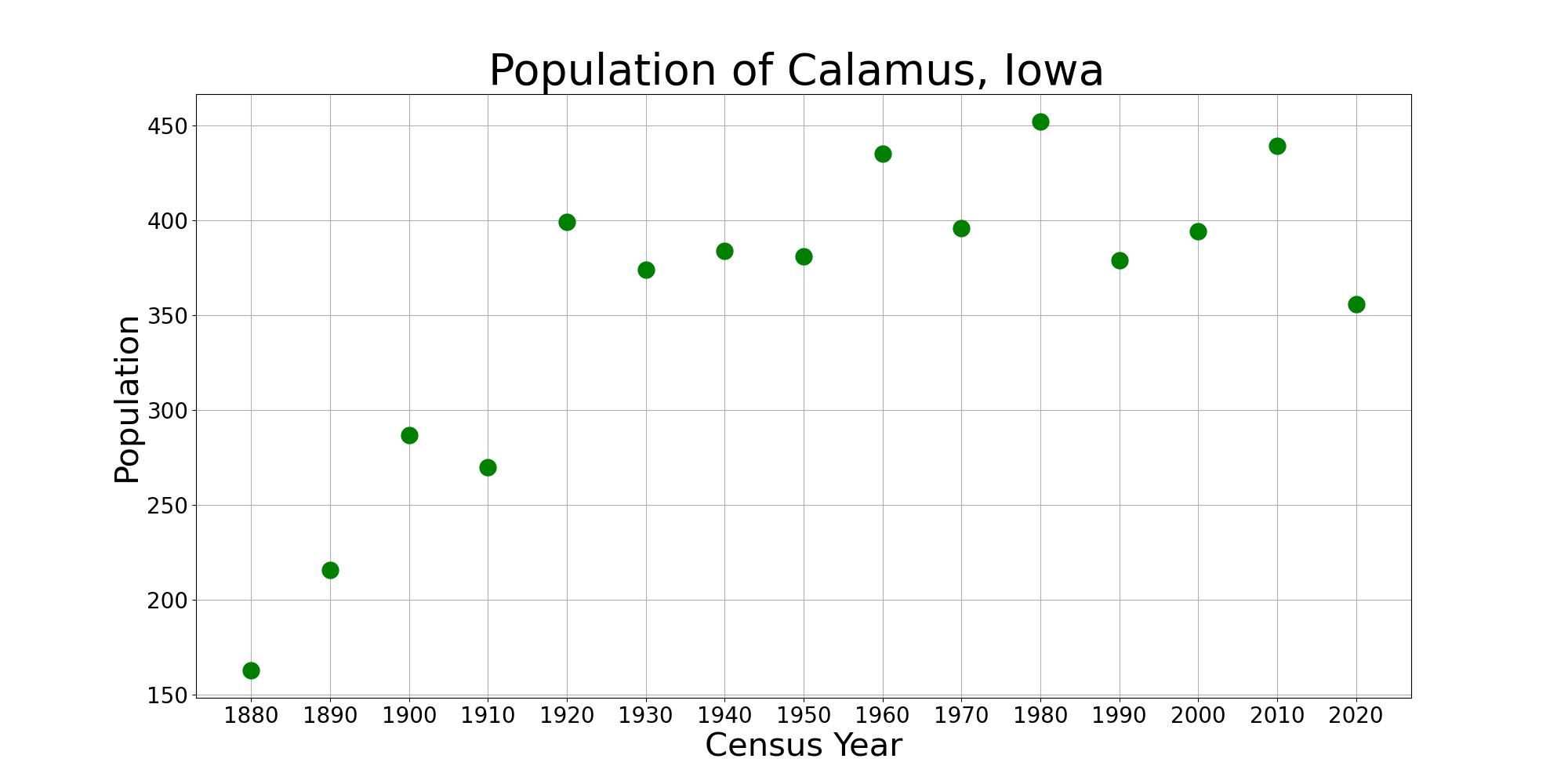
The population of Calamus, Iowa from US census data

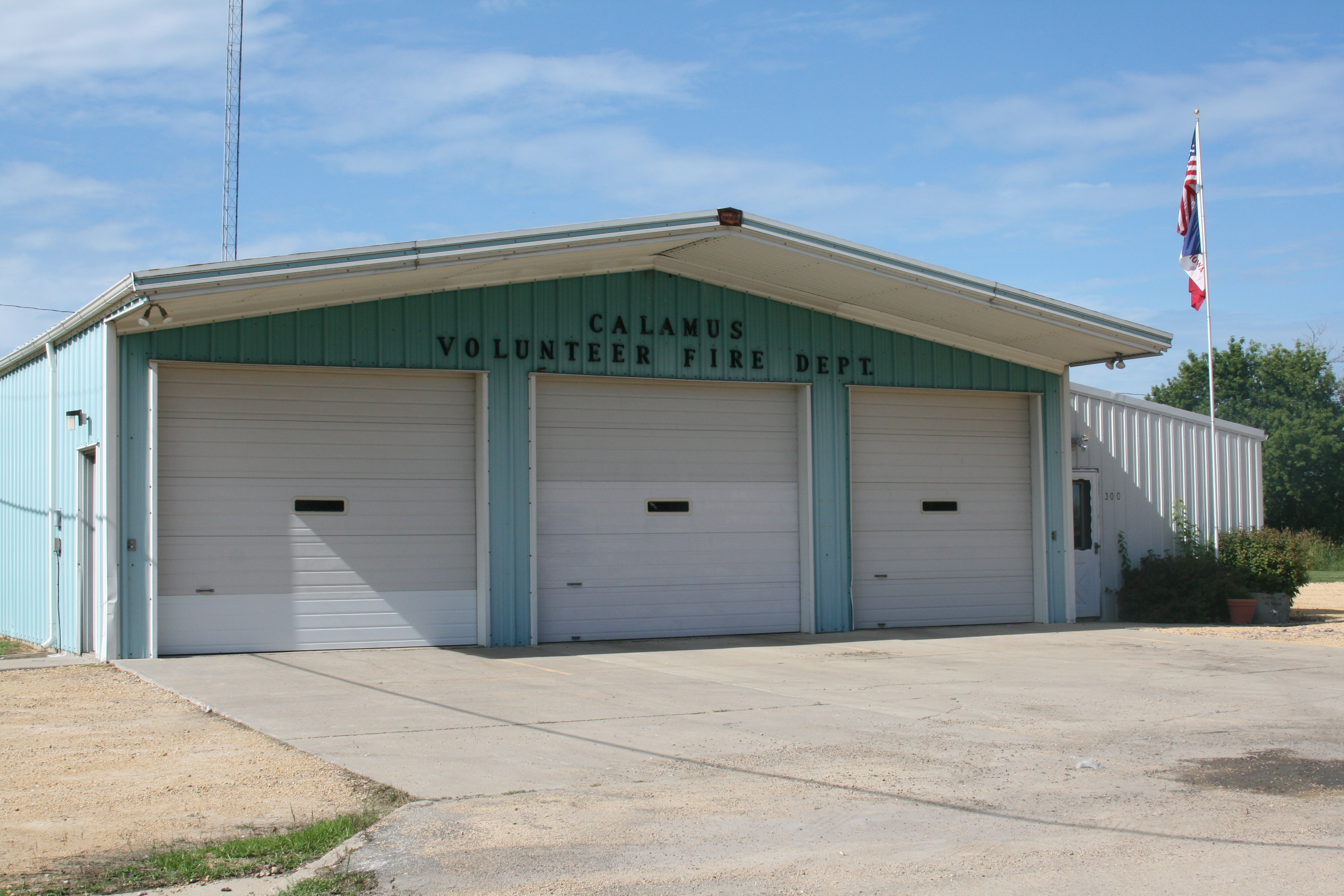
Old Volunteer Fire Station

=== 2020 census ===
As of the census of 2020, there were 356 people, 165 households, and 103 families residing in the city. The population density was 721.6 inhabitants per square mile (278.6/km^{2}). There were 179 housing units at an average density of 362.8 per square mile (140.1/km^{2}). The racial makeup of the city was 95.2% White, 0.6% Black or African American, 0.3% Native American, 0.3% Asian, 0.0% Pacific Islander, 0.8% from other races and 2.8% from two or more races. Hispanic or Latino persons of any race comprised 2.5% of the population.

Of the 165 households, 24.8% of which had children under the age of 18 living with them, 42.4% were married couples living together, 6.7% were cohabitating couples, 23.6% had a female householder with no spouse or partner present and 27.3% had a male householder with no spouse or partner present. 37.6% of all households were non-families. 31.5% of all households were made up of individuals, 13.9% had someone living alone who was 65 years old or older.

The median age in the city was 50.1 years. 20.5% of the residents were under the age of 20; 5.1% were between the ages of 20 and 24; 20.2% were from 25 and 44; 28.9% were from 45 and 64; and 25.3% were 65 years of age or older. The gender makeup of the city was 53.1% male and 46.9% female.

=== 2010 census ===
As of the census of 2010, there were 439 people, 175 households, and 127 families residing in the city. The population density was 914.6 inhabitants per square mile (353.1/km^{2}). There were 185 housing units at an average density of 385.4 per square mile (148.8/km^{2}). The racial makeup of the city was 95.9% White, 0.2% Native American, 0.9% from other races, and 3.0% from two or more races. Hispanic or Latino of any race were 1.6% of the population.

There were 175 households, of which 32.0% had children under the age of 18 living with them, 57.7% were married couples living together, 7.4% had a female householder with no husband present, 7.4% had a male householder with no wife present, and 27.4% were non-families. 24.6% of all households were made up of individuals, and 13.7% had someone living alone who was 65 years of age or older. The average household size was 2.51 and the average family size was 2.91.

The median age in the city was 40.2 years. 26.7% of residents were under the age of 18; 8.1% were between the ages of 18 and 24; 21.6% were from 25 to 44; 25.7% were from 45 to 64; and 17.8% were 65 years of age or older. The gender makeup of the city was 50.6% male and 49.4% female.

=== 2000 census ===
As of the census of 2000, there were 394 people, 168 households, and 122 families residing in the city. The population density was 808.5 inhabitants per square mile (312.2/km^{2}). There were 173 housing units at an average density of 355.0 per square mile (137.1/km^{2}). The racial makeup of the city was 99.24% White, 0.25% Native American, and 0.51% from two or more races. Hispanic or Latino of any race were 0.76% of the population.

There were 168 households, out of which 29.8% had children under the age of 18 living with them, 60.1% were married couples living together, 10.1% had a female householder with no husband present, and 26.8% were non-families. 25.0% of all households were made up of individuals, and 14.9% had someone living alone who was 65 years of age or older. The average household size was 2.35 and the average family size was 2.76.

23.4% are under the age of 18, 5.8% from 18 to 24, 29.9% from 25 to 44, 21.6% from 45 to 64, and 19.3% who were 65 years of age or older. The median age was 38 years. For every 100 females, there were 90.3 males. For every 100 females age 18 and over, there were 89.9 males.

The median income for a household in the city was $38,214, and the median income for a family was $45,234. Males had a median income of $31,406 versus $21,875 for females. The per capita income for the city was $15,306. About 8.4% of families and 9.2% of the population were below the poverty line, including 9.3% of those under age 18 and 8.8% of those age 65 or over.

== Education ==
The Calamus–Wheatland Community School District operates public schools serving the community. The district was established on July 1, 1990, by the merger of the Calamus and Wheatland school districts. Calamus–Wheatland High School in Wheatland is a comprehensive four year high school.

The first school in town was built before 1876. It was a one-room log building located on the present site of the Rose Hill Cemetery. Long benches were used as seats, long boards as desks, and a table served as the teachers desk. Miss Julia Cook (Ferren) was the first teacher. Later a white frame building was erected south of the railroad tracks. In 1902 a red brick building was erected at the same location, at the cost of $3,000. For the school year of 1909–10, the county superintendent report to the state superintendent of schools stated that Calamus had one male and two female teachers and an attendance of 78.

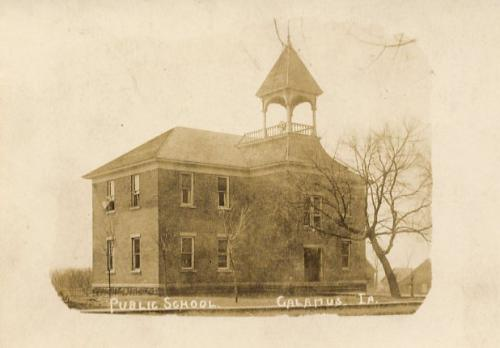
Public School, Calamus, Iowa 1907

In 1919, it was voted to consolidate with several country school districts, and school buses were purchased. They were Model T Fords with no heat and the seats were lengthwise on both sides of the bus. The upstairs of the McCarthy building was used for the High School and the grades were housed in the old school. During the school year of 1920–21, a classroom was located in the Methodist Church and on the stage of the Auditorium. On May 17, 1921, the first graduation exercises were held in the new school, which was nearing completion, and on the same day dedication of the school was held. The next fall, school was held in the new building. The building is located at the south end of 2nd St. and was erected at a cost of $100,000. The school board members at that time were C. A. Blake, President; Hans Johnson; Wm. F. Siegmund; Jonathan Hayes, Jr. and Eli Olson. The district was known as the Calamus Consolidated School.

On May 3, 1946, marking the end of the 27 yr. period of indebtedness, the mortgage deed of the Calamus Consolidated School was burned at a ceremony in the school auditorium.

In 1950, six rooms and a large gymnasium were added at a cost of $125,000. In 1964, another six rooms were added at a cost of $196,000. The vote on the bond issue for the construction of this addition carried by 92.8%, an all-time high in the state of Iowa.

== Media ==
Calamus has not had many home printed newspapers.

The first paper that was issued in Calamus was established by H. L. Barter and was called the Free Press. After some time, F. L. Sunderlin, later of the Delmar Journal, associated himself with Barter and the paper was continued under the name of Barter and Sunderlin. It did not have a very long existence and for various reasons it suspended publication.

Whip and Cook printed a newspaper here in the 1880s. It also had a very brief existence.

The Calamus Record was the latest newspaper venture for Calamus. It was established in 1901 by A. J. Gault and enjoyed a longer existence than the other newspapers.

== Parks and recreation ==
Calamus has 4 county parks:

- Sherman Park
- Syracuse Wildlife area
- Ringneck Marsh Wildlife Management Area
- Mockridge County Wildlife Preserve

=== Water trails - canoeing and kayaking ===
- Wapsipinicon River Water Trail

== Religion ==
=== Wesley United Methodist Church ===
The first church built in Calamus was the Methodist Church built in 1869. Two-by-twelve planks were used for seating, supplemented by a few chairs. In 1870, a choir loft was added to the south of the building, also a belfry and bell, and the planks were replaced by 175 chairs. The church was painted inside and out. In 1906, this building was torn down and a new one erected of white brick with Gothic windows and frosted panes at a cost of approximately $3,000. Later, a basement was put under the Church for social activities and electricity was installed in 1917. Prior to that, lighting was done with carbide lights. This building burned November 4, 1927. Dedication of the new and present structure was held September 8, 1929. It is in use today under the name of Wesley United Methodist Church.

=== Calamus Lutheran Parish ===
The Calamus Lutheran Parish consists of two congregations, Our Savior’s Kvindherred Lutheran Church (Calamus, Iowa) and Faith Lutheran Church. While they are two individual congregations with individual histories, Our Savior's and Faith have some history in common. This began in 1853 when the eighth Norwegian settlement in Iowa was started in Olive Township of Clinton County. Those wishing to form a worshipping community selected a site southeast of Calamus to build their church. The first congregational records were dated December 27, 1861. However, congregational activities had begun before that date. In 1865 a school was built. The name Kvindherred was the region in Norway from which the settlers had come. By 1877, the Kvindherred Lutheran Church was erected. In 1946, the name was changed to Our Savior's.

In 1947, discussion was started as to building a new church or remodeling the existing church. Decisions were difficult to make. One group remained in the country and remodeled the existing church. Another group, together with the pastor, left to form a congregation in the town of Calamus.

Faith Lutheran Church was officially organized on July 7, 1950. A parsonage was donated as well as adjoining lots to construct a new building. Faith Lutheran Church was officially accepted into the Evangelical Lutheran Church Synod on June 6, 1951.

In 1972, a cooperative ministry was established between Faith and Our Savior's. One pastor serves both churches.

=== Gallery ===
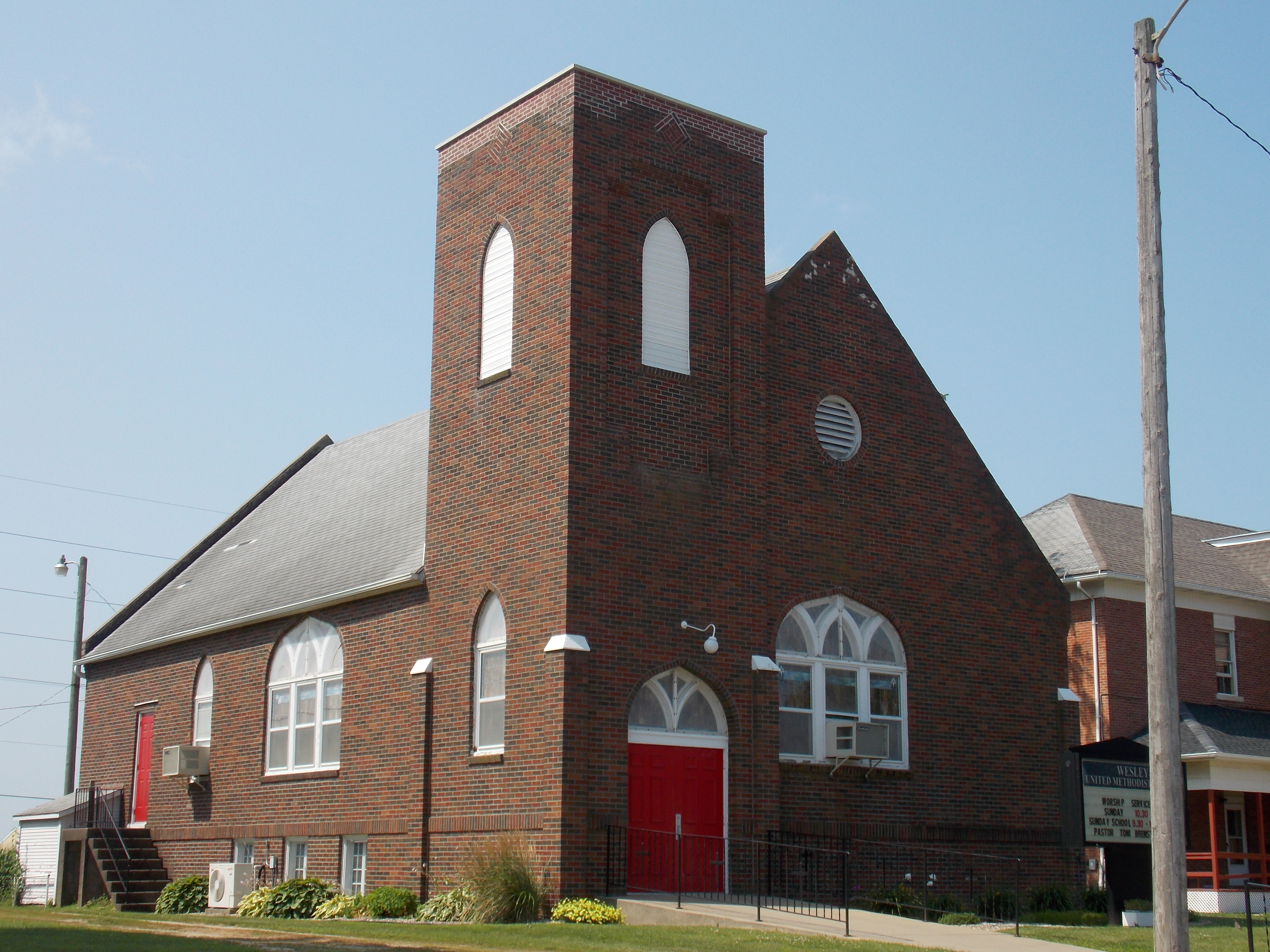
Wesley United Methodist Church

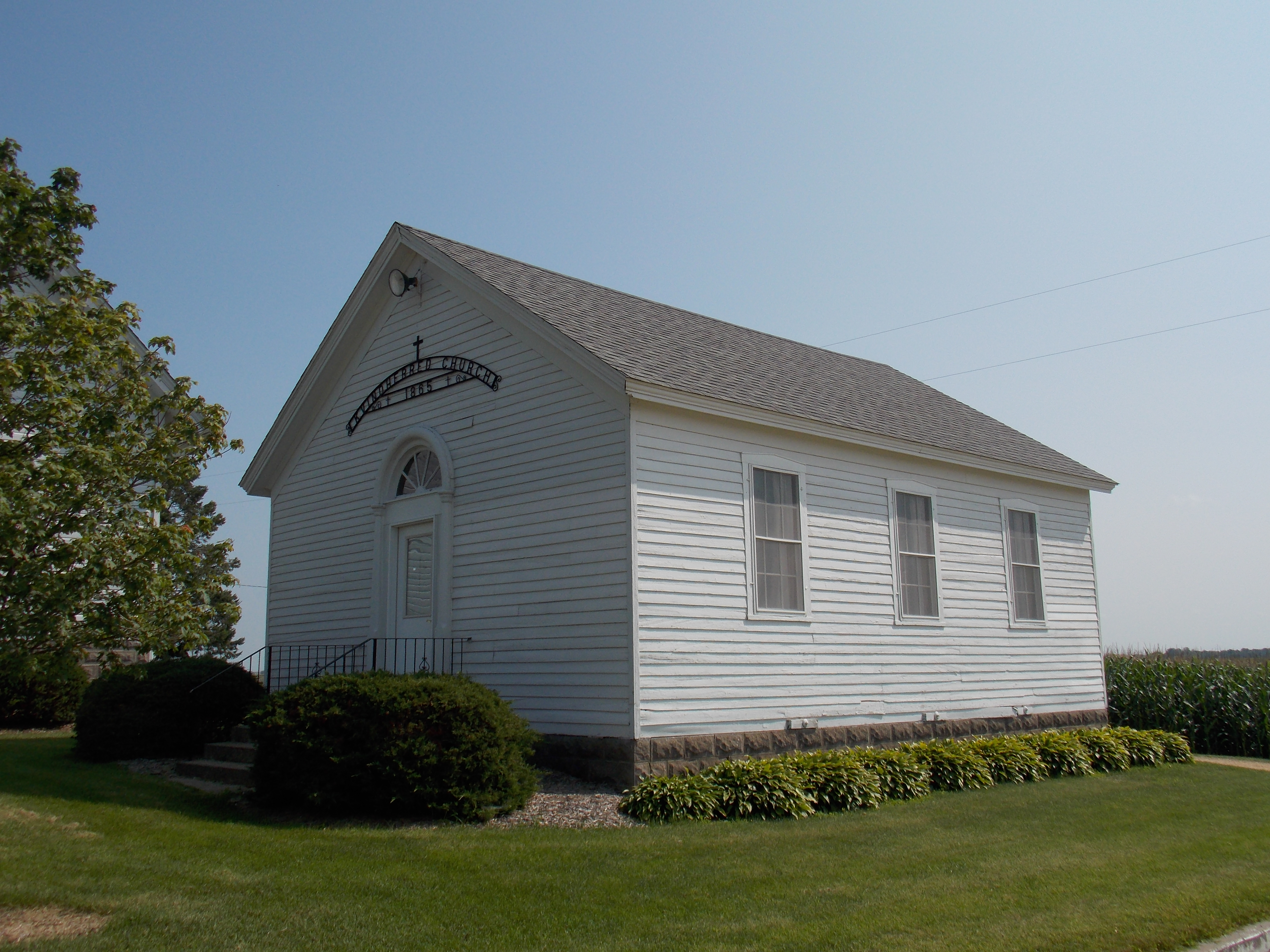
Kvindherred Church school at rural Calamus was built in 1865. It was used until the larger church was built in 1877.

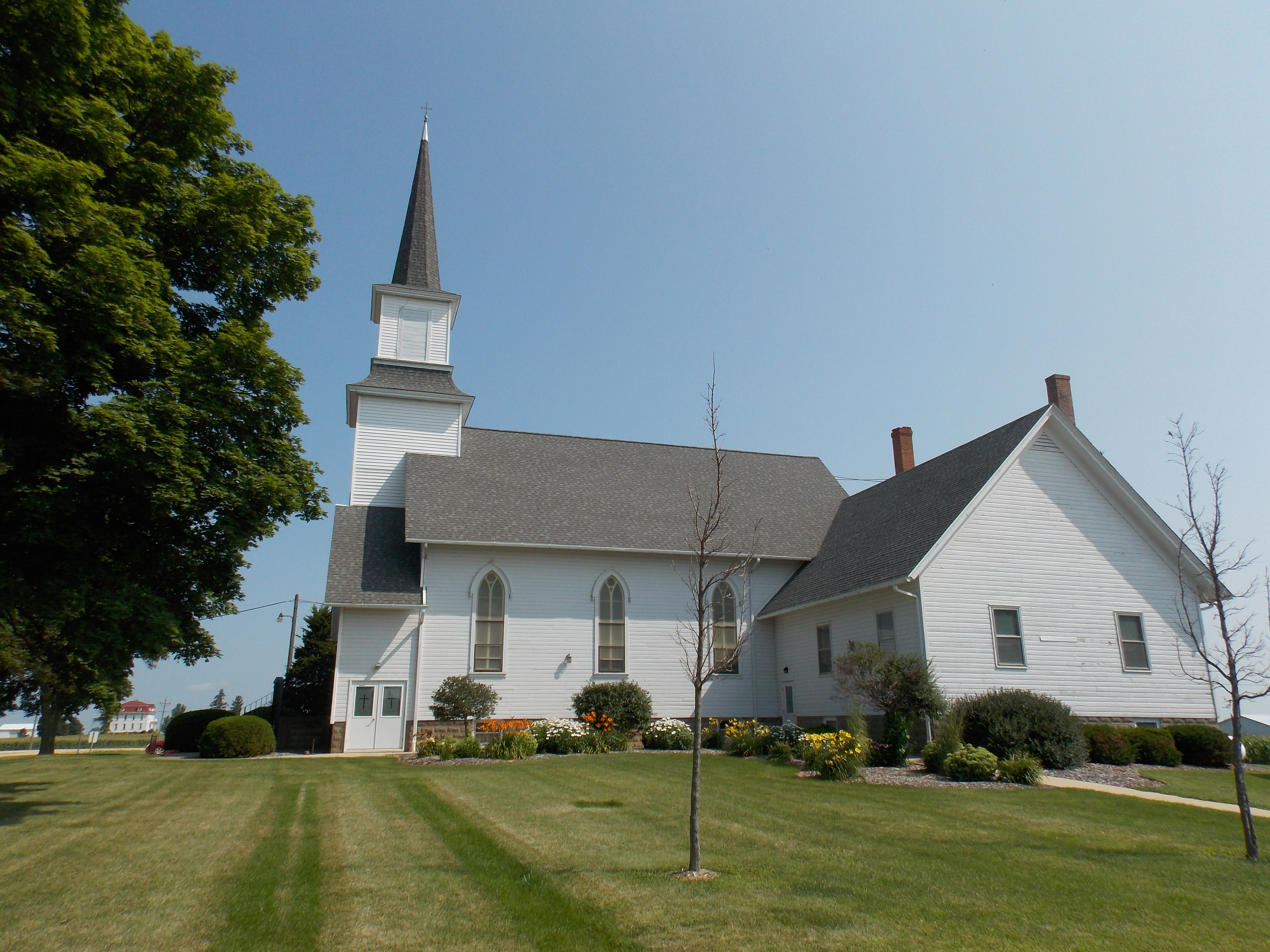
Our Savior’s Lutheran Church in 2014

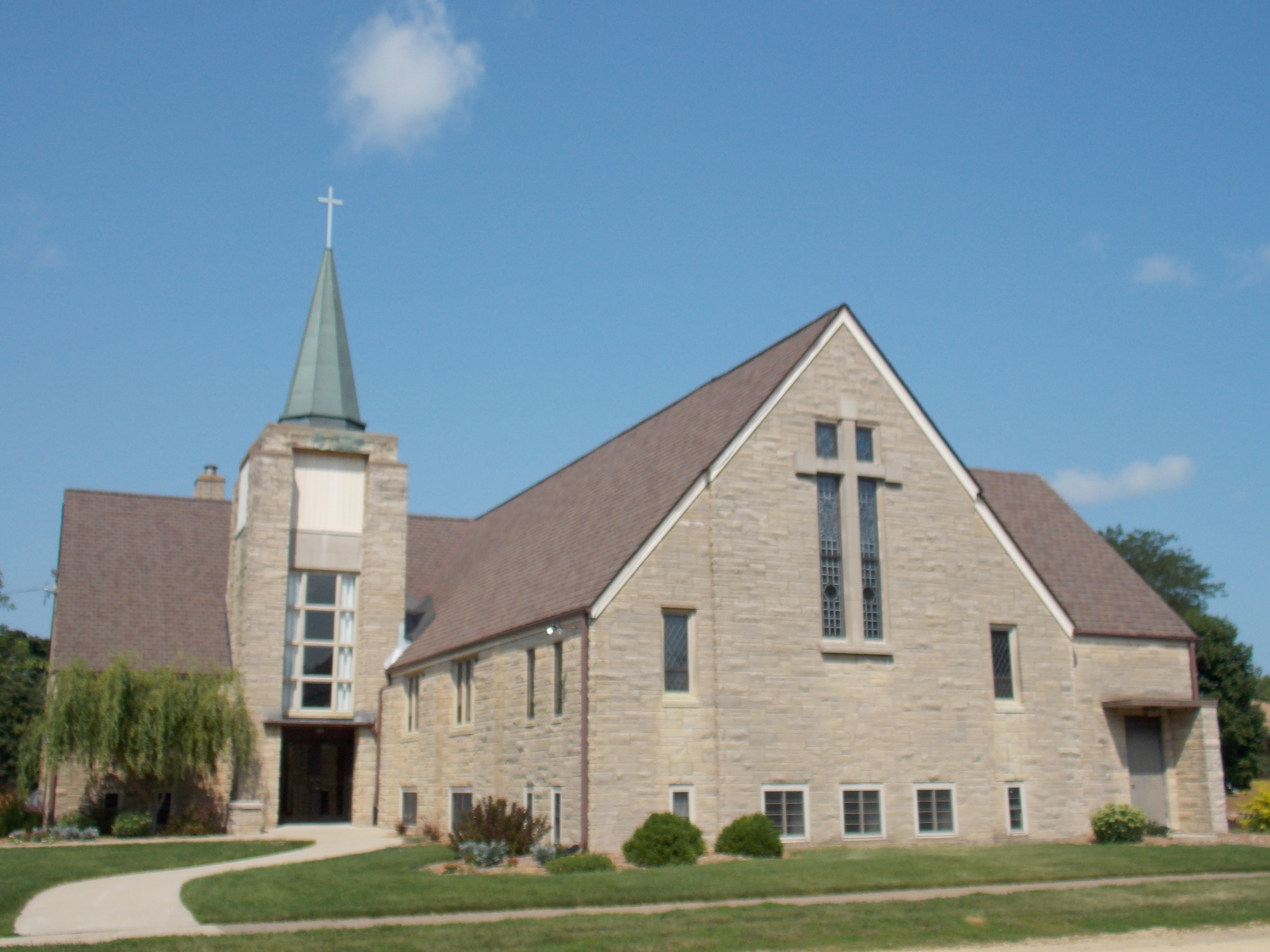
Faith Lutheran Church

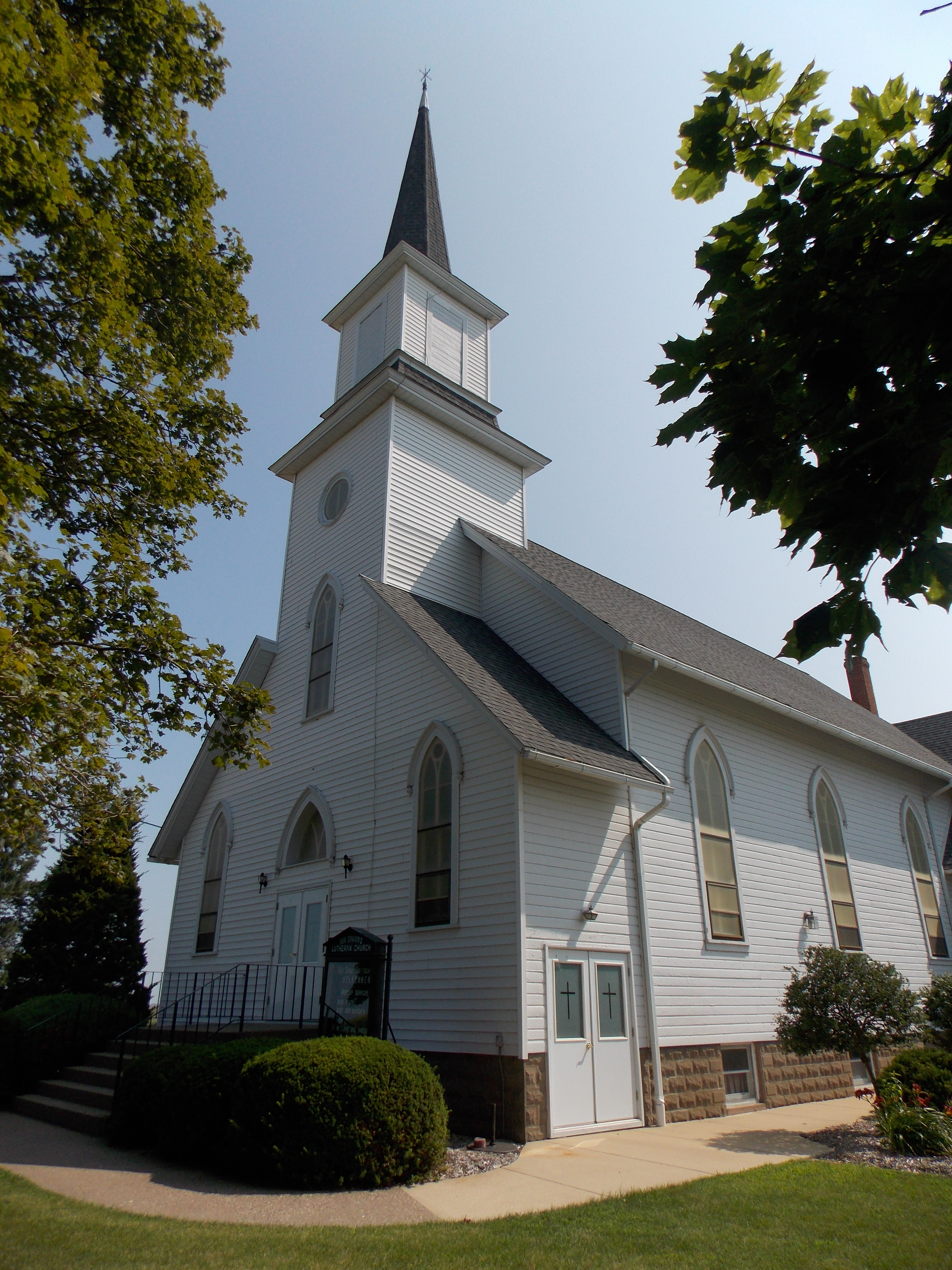
Church façade. By 1877, the Kvindherred Lutheran Church was erected.

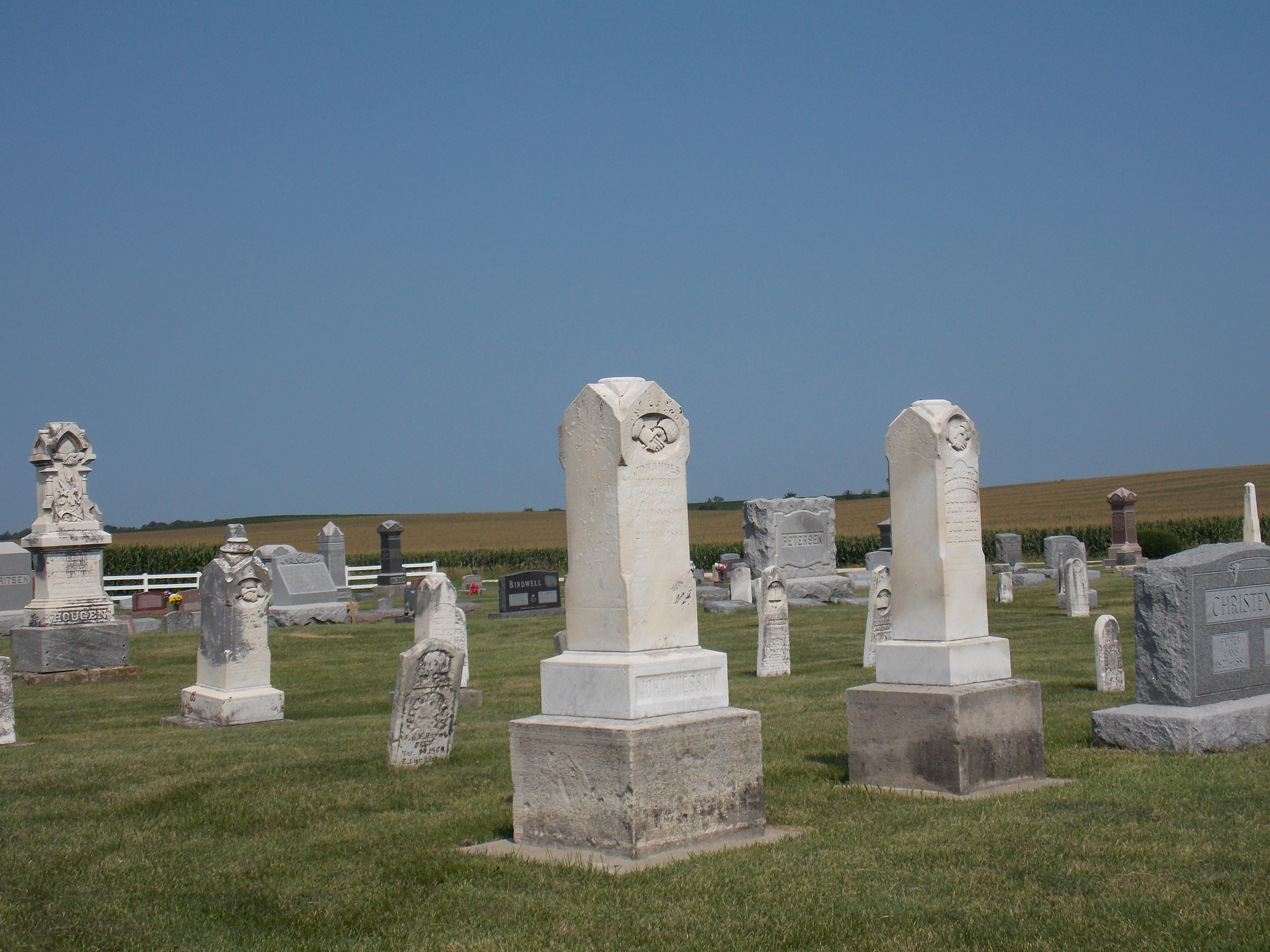
Cemetery

== See also ==
- Our Savior’s Kvindherred Lutheran Church, listed on the National Register of Historic Places.
