= Olive Township, Clinton County, Iowa =

Township in Iowa, US

Olive Township
- Township
- Location in Clinton County
- Coordinates: 41°48′25″N 090°43′28″W
- Country: United States
- State: Iowa
- County: Clinton

Area
  - Total: 41.75 sq mi (108.14 km^{2})
  - Land: 41.69 sq mi (107.98 km^{2})
  - Water: 0.062 sq mi (0.16 km^{2}) 0.15%
- Elevation: 712 ft (217 m)

Population (2000)
  - Total: 846
  - Density: 20/sq mi (7.8/km^{2})
- GNIS feature ID: 0468462

Olive Township is a township in Clinton County, Iowa, United States. As of the 2000 census, its population was 846.

== History ==
=== Early settlement ===
Olive Township was organized in October, 1842. The boundaries as then designated have been previously given. Its present territory includes nearly all of fractional Townships 80 and 81 north, Range 2 east. It is bounded north by Grant Township (previously named Berlin Township), west by Spring Rock Township, south by the Wapsie, which is the county line, and east by Orange Township.

Among the early settlers in this township were Hiram Brown, Charles Dutton Sr. and his sons Lorenzo, Charles Jr., Leroy and Jerome Dutton, Lyman Alger, Joseph Alger, E. F. Owen, William Scott, Bennett Warren, Mr. Edgar, D. C. Curtis, Josiah Hill, Abram Hendrickson and others.

The Dutton family came early into the township. Their total possessions were about $60 in cash and a few household effects. They purchased a pair of cattle, and the first season broke about ten acres of prairie and sowed white winter wheat. This crop was harvested and hauled to Davenport, through sloughs and mud-holes, the load having frequently to be unloaded to get out, and was sold for 30 cents per bushel, one half in store pay, and a part of the balance in cash articles, which meant groceries. The store pay was calico and similar dry goods. In 1849, they hauled pork to Dubuque and sold for $1.75, three-fourths store pay and the balance cash.

J. S. Stowrs, Esq., opened a law office in De Witt in 1844, building the first building for such an office erected there, a brick one, and he relates that his first fee was a load of pumpkins which were drawn to him by Mr. Names, and his second fee a load of wood drawn to him by Mr. James Kirtley. Finding it necessary to eke out his income, he resorted to school-teaching, and, in 1846, he says, he opened the first school in Olive Township. There was no schoolhouse, few school-books and those of every variety, such as had been brought by the settlers from their various starting-points. When he arrived at the place, he found the School Director making ready for his coming. The building was an old log-house and the Director was boring holes in slabs for seats and into the logs to drive pins, upon which a board was laid for the desk. A stone chimney in one end served for heating purposes. Being an attorney and having been Probate Judge in the county, Mr. Stowrs commanded munificent wages, and he was paid $12 per month and boarded around. The children were eager to learn, and, despite these disadvantages, improved the time. He also organized a Sunday school. Rev. Mr. Emerson coming down and giving it a start, but Mr. Stowrs says that the day school was the most successful, the Sunday school interfering with the fishing.

In 1839, there was a trail known as Boone's Trail, over which a man named Boone drove cattle from Missouri to Galena, by way of Maquoketa. His usual crossing-place on the Wapsie was on Section 5, Township 80 north, Range 2 east. The first ferryman was an old pioneer of the name of John Shook, who had a small flat-boat which would just take on one team and which was run by a rope. R. I. Jencks succeeded him, whether by purchase or by entry of the landings, is not certainly known. He named the ferry Buena Vista, after that battle had been fought. He also succeeded in securing a post office here, which was called Buena Vista, which has since been removed to Rothstein's Mill, but still bears the same name. Jencks sold out the ferry franchise to George Atherton in 1849, and a few weeks later he sold out to Dr. Amos Witter, a gentleman who was emigrating to California overland, but when he had reached this point had wearied of his journey. He afterward died in the service as a Brigade Surgeon. Dr. Witter sold out to a man named Edgar, sometime previous to 1854. J. E. McArthur succeeded him and ran the ferry until 1858, when he sold to James Merritt, and, in the spring of 1859, he sold to Jerome Dutton, who continued to operate it until the spring of 1865, when the land on the Clinton County side was sold to J. W. S. Robinson and James Dumphy, Mr. Dutton still owning the lands on the Scott County side, and the ferry was discontinued. This had been one of the most profitable ferries on the Wapsie for many years, and particularly during the Pike's Peak excitement in 1859, but the erection of the Rothstein Bridge destroyed its value. Lyman Alger also had a ferry in this township for many years and is one of the first settlers of record to whom license was issued to keep a ferry across the Wapsie. The Chicago, Iowa & Nebraska Railroad also temporarily operated a ferry for the transfer of passengers on the stage-route until the railroad was completed across the river.

This township is mostly level and has considerable bog or swamp land, but drainage and cultivation is bringing nearly all of it into arable fields. Much of this land was held out of market as mineral lands until 1850 to 1855, as there were considerable deposits of bog-iron ore, but never found in paying quantities.

There are several quarries in this township, and, on the farm of William V. Cruson, there was opened this year a limestone quarry which is producing quality lime.

There are several peat-beds in the township, and, in 1867, an attempt was made to manufacture peat on the farm of John A. Boyd. The quality of the peat made was excellent but the enterprise was not a financial success.

In 1860, the total vote polled in the township was 140, and before any draft was ordered seventy-nine men had volunteered into the service, mostly in the Second, Eighth and Twenty-sixth Infantry, and the First and Seventh Cavalry. This was conceded to be the banner township in the State.

After the close of the war, a Post of the G. A. R. was organized and maintained for a number of years.

A large representation in the present population is of Norwegians. They have a Lutheran church in the southeastern part of the township and have recently erected a very fine church edifice. They also have a parsonage and sustain a Pastor, who preaches to them in their native tongue.

About one or two miles south from the Norwegian Church, the German Lutherans also have a church edifice and parsonage. Their Pastor, in addition to his ministerial duties, also teaches a German school. The oldest church organization, however, in the township, is a Free-Will Baptist Church, which used to worship in the old log schoolhouse, mentioned before, and which now worships in the Alger Schoolhouse, and whose spiritual shepherd is Rev, D. C. Curtis.

A post office was established in 1858. Joseph D. Fegan was deputized to go there and establish the office. No one could suggest a name. Mr. Fegan said Is there no creek or anything?" "Yes, Calamus Creek." "Then let it be Calamus." The creek takes its name from the great quantities of "sweet flag" growing in it.

Probably no occurrence ever occasioned greater excitement throughout Olive Township, and, indeed, throughout the whole surrounding country, than that of the murder of Mrs. Esther Alger, the aged wife of Lyman Alger, both of whom were among the earliest settlers in the township as well as in the county. Mr. Alger had accumulated a large property, and was in the habit of loaning money to quite an extent, and frequently had quite considerable sums of money in the house. To obtain a large amount supposed to be in the house at the time of the crime, it is conjectured, was the object of its commission. Mrs. Alger was an aged lady of seventy-two years, and her husband a year her senior. They lived alone, except a grandson, Judson Curtis. On the evening of September 25, 1872, Mr. Alger had gone to the schoolhouse, a short distance away, to attend a prayer-meeting. Judson had gone over to his father's barn, about forty rods distant, and the old lady was left alone at home. She was evidently busily engaged in some household duties about the door, having her sun-bonnet on. While thus engaged, she was shot down and, afterward beaten to death with some blunt instrument, supposedly an ax. Judson heard the shot fired, and, running to the house, found the dead body of his grandmother lying in the path near the door, the house opened, and the trunk where the money was kept rifled. He gave the alarm at the schoolhouse, and the people hurried to the scene to find that one of the most brutal of murders had been committed, almost in broad daylight. Between $1,000 and $1,500 were taken from the trunk.

Although some arrests were made, and diligent efforts put forth to discover the perpetrators of the crime, it is still an unsolved mystery.

=== Abandoned towns ===
Buena Vista - abandoned in 1914

== Geography ==
Olive Township covers an area of 41.75 square miles (108.1 km^{2}) and contains one incorporated settlement, Calamus. According to the USGS, it contains ten cemeteries: Alger, Boyd, Dubois, Dutton, Immanuel, Kuebler, Kvindherred, Mowder, Rose Hill, Union, and Kohnert.
