= Big Rock, Iowa =

- Census-designated place
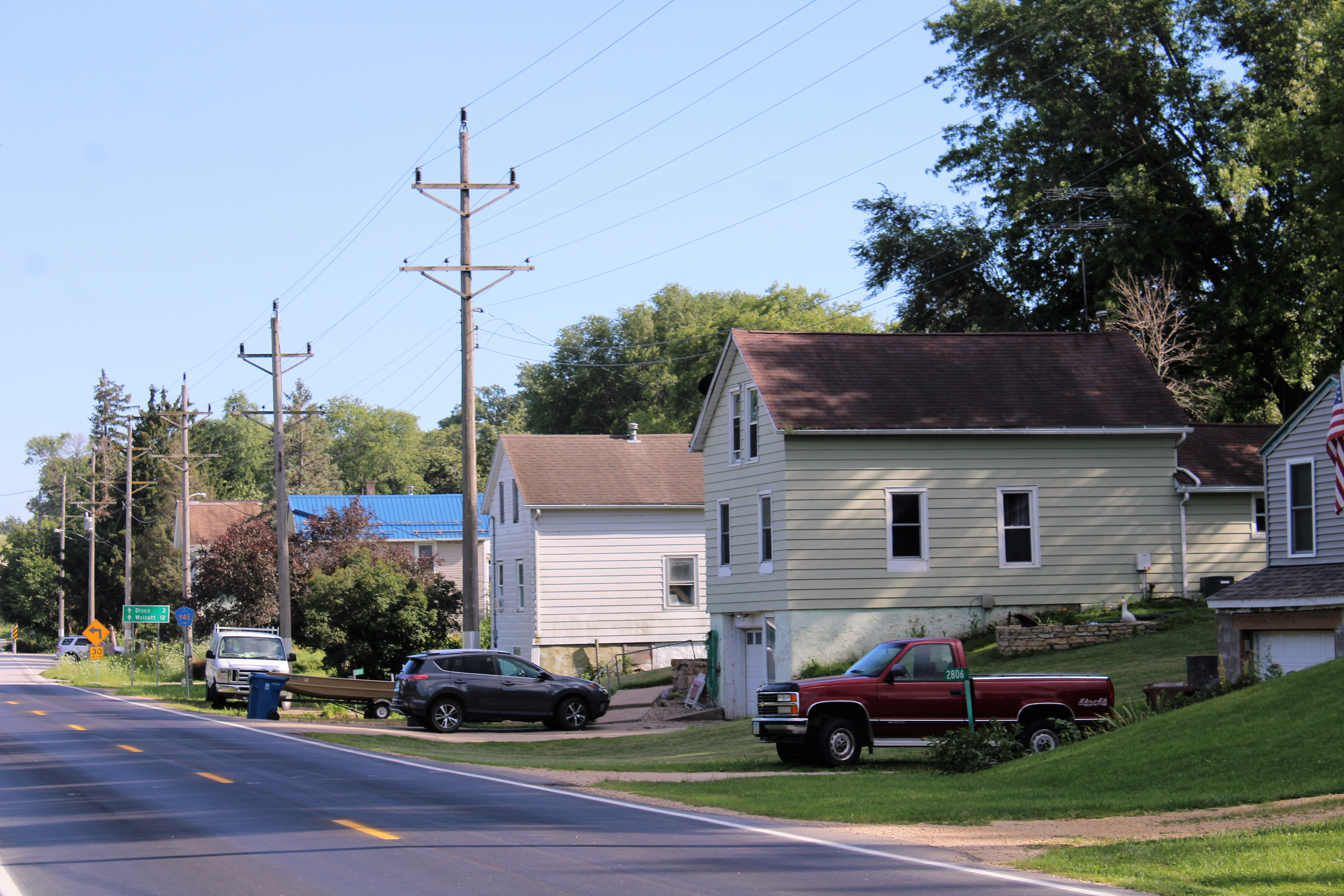
- Street scene in Big Rock

- Location of Big Rock within the state of Iowa
- Coordinates: 41°46′09″N 90°49′36″W
- Country: United States
- State: Iowa
- County: Scott County; Clinton County

Area
  - Total: 0.33 sq mi (0.85 km^{2})
  - Land: 0.33 sq mi (0.85 km^{2})
  - Water: 0 sq mi (0.00 km^{2})
- Elevation: 676 ft (206 m)

Population (2020)
  - Total: 49
  - Density: 149/sq mi (57.4/km^{2})
- Time zone: UTC-6 (Central (CST))
  - Summer (DST): UTC-5 (CDT)
- Area code: 563
- GNIS feature ID: 2806455

Big Rock is an unincorporated community and census-designated place (CDP) in Scott and Clinton counties, Iowa, United States. As of the 2020 census, Big Rock had a population of 49. The community is named for a large boulder.

== Geography ==
Big Rock is located at the intersection of County Road Y42E and 317th Street, in the northwest corner of Scott County, northwest of Dixon and south of Wheatland.

== Demographics ==
Historical population
Census	Pop.	Note	%±
2020	49		—
U.S. Decennial Census

=== 2020 census ===
As of the census of 2020, there were 49 people, 23 households, and 7 families residing in the community. The population density was 148.7 inhabitants per square mile (57.4/km^{2}). There were 26 housing units at an average density of 78.9 per square mile (30.5/km^{2}). The racial makeup of the community was 81.6% White, 2.0% Black or African American, 2.0% Native American, 2.0% Asian, 0.0% Pacific Islander, 0.0% from other races and 12.2% from two or more races. Hispanic or Latino persons of any race comprised 4.1% of the population.

Of the 23 households, 8.7% of which had children under the age of 18 living with them, 17.4% were married couples living together, 4.3% were cohabitating couples, 47.8% had a female householder with no spouse or partner present and 30.4% had a male householder with no spouse or partner present. 69.6% of all households were non-families. 65.2% of all households were made up of individuals, 21.7% had someone living alone who was 65 years old or older.

The median age in the community was 57.8 years. 8.2% of the residents were under the age of 20; 6.1% were between the ages of 20 and 24; 14.3% were from 25 and 44; 49.0% were from 45 and 64; and 22.4% were 65 years of age or older. The gender makeup of the community was 55.1% male and 44.9% female.

== History ==
Big Rock was founded by Peter Goddard in 1855, named after a large rock in the area.

For 113 years, one of the town's main businesses was Horstmann's General Store, a general store where area residents could purchase groceries, supplies and miscellaneous items. The store closed in 2010 after the owner died. The town at one time also had a railroad station, a lumber yard, a dance hall, and a tavern, all of which also have since closed. It is home to a local cemetery, with dates of death going back to the mid-1880s and earlier. The city used to be a shipping port for timber and wood, as well as distributed ice throughout the area via a small waterfall that was accessed in a wooded area away from the main highway that now runs through the middle of the town. This ice was brought across from the wooded area and then slid down a large hill to deliver to the town and the rail yard for distribution.

The population was 97 in 1940.

Big Rock was also home to two churches, one of which was torn down in the early 2000s.

The town still from time to time will get together for "Big Rock days", a celebration of the local community in front of the large rock in which the town is named after.

== Education ==
It is in the Calamus-Wheatland Community School District.

== Notable people ==
- Martin Burns
