= Toronto, Iowa =

- City
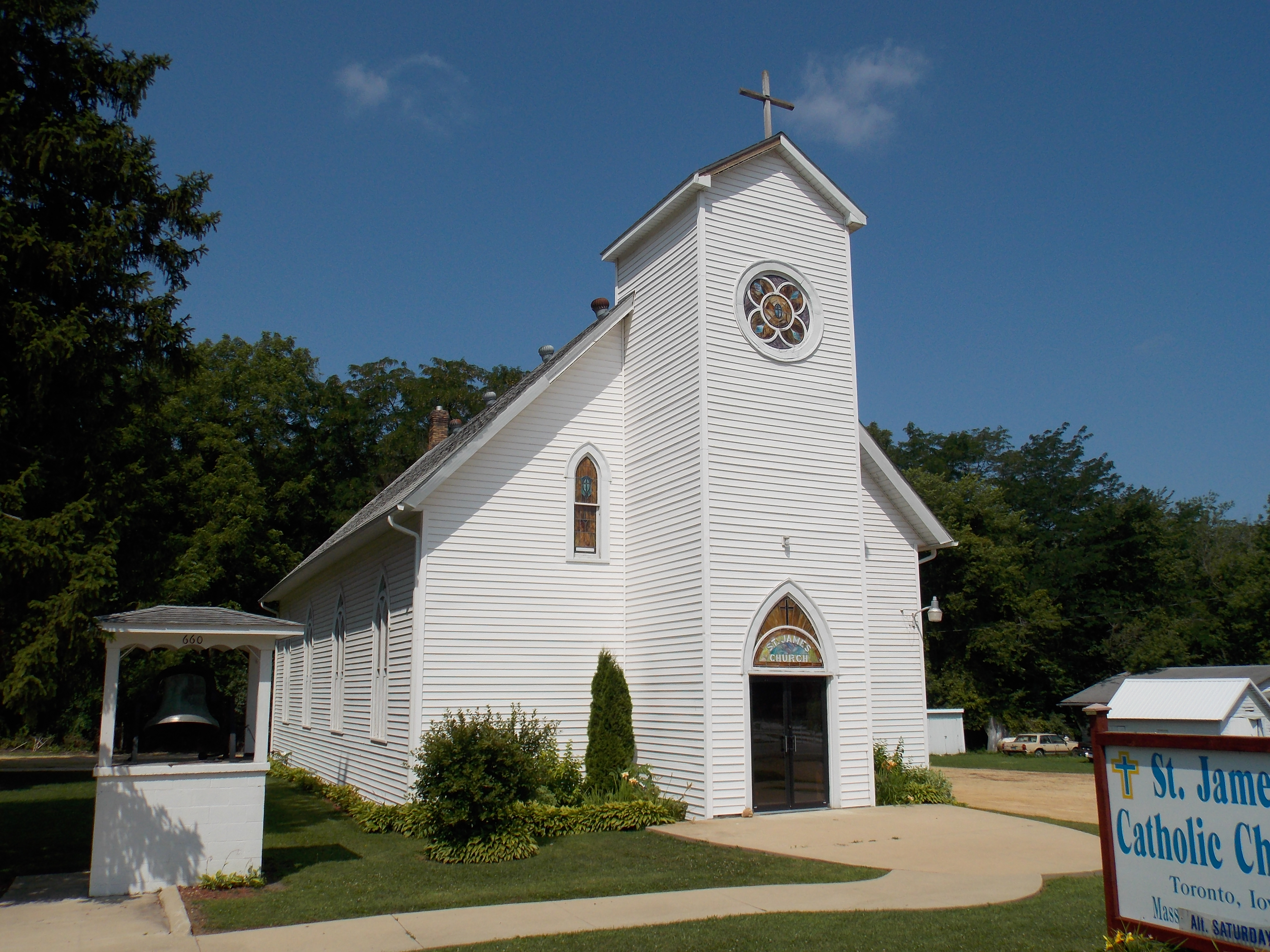
- Saint James Catholic Church

- Location of Toronto, Iowa
- Coordinates: 41°54′11″N 90°51′46″W
- Country: United States
- State: Iowa
- County: Clinton
- Incorporated: July 26, 1909
- Named for: Toronto, Ontario, Canada

Area
  - Total: 0.18 sq mi (0.47 km^{2})
  - Land: 0.18 sq mi (0.47 km^{2})
  - Water: 0 sq mi (0.00 km^{2})
- Elevation: 735 ft (224 m)

Population (2020)
  - Total: 102
  - Density: 559.0/sq mi (215.85/km^{2})
- Time zone: UTC-6 (Central (CST))
  - Summer (DST): UTC-5 (CDT)
- ZIP code: 52777
- Area code: 563
- FIPS code: 19-78600
- GNIS feature ID: 2397038

Toronto is a small city in Clinton County, Iowa, United States. The population was 102 at the time of the 2020 census.

== History ==
Toronto was platted in 1853 by George W. Thorne (1817-1898), born in Maidstone, Kent, England in and raised in Toronto, Ontario, Canada. Thorne had built a sawmill and gristmill at the site in the 1840s.

== Geography ==
According to the United States Census Bureau, the city has a total area of 0.19 square miles (0.49 km^{2}), all land.

== Demographics ==
Historical populations
Year	Pop.	±%
1910	106	—
1920	139	+31.1%
1930	113	−18.7%
1940	142	+25.7%
1950	165	+16.2%
1960	144	−12.7%
1970	145	+0.7%
1980	172	+18.6%
1990	132	−23.3%
2000	134	+1.5%
2010	124	−7.5%
2020	102	−17.7%
Source:"U.S. Census website". United States Census Bureau. and Iowa Data Center; Source: U.S. Decennial Census

=== 2020 census ===
As of the census of 2020, there were 102 people, 48 households, and 37 families residing in the city. The population density was 559.0 inhabitants per square mile (215.9/km^{2}). There were 55 housing units at an average density of 301.4 per square mile (116.4/km^{2}). The racial makeup of the city was 90.2% White, 0.0% Black or African American, 0.0% Native American, 1.0% Asian, 0.0% Pacific Islander, 0.0% from other races and 8.8% from two or more races. Hispanic or Latino persons of any race comprised 3.9% of the population.

Of the 48 households, 29.2% of which had children under the age of 18 living with them, 43.8% were married couples living together, 14.6% were cohabitating couples, 22.9% had a female householder with no spouse or partner present and 18.8% had a male householder with no spouse or partner present. 22.9% of all households were non-families. 10.4% of all households were made up of individuals, 6.2% had someone living alone who was 65 years old or older.

The median age in the city was 45.0 years. 20.6% of the residents were under the age of 20; 2.9% were between the ages of 20 and 24; 26.5% were from 25 and 44; 20.6% were from 45 and 64; and 29.4% were 65 years of age or older. The gender makeup of the city was 51.0% male and 49.0% female.

=== 2010 census ===
As of the census of 2010, there were 124 people, 48 households, and 36 families living in the city. The population density was 652.6 inhabitants per square mile (252.0/km^{2}). There were 59 housing units at an average density of 310.5 per square mile (119.9/km^{2}). The racial makeup of the city was 97.6% White and 2.4% African American. Hispanic or Latino of any race were 2.4% of the population.

There were 48 households, of which 27.1% had children under the age of 18 living with them, 66.7% were married couples living together, 2.1% had a female householder with no husband present, 6.3% had a male householder with no wife present, and 25.0% were non-families. 22.9% of all households were made up of individuals, and 12.5% had someone living alone who was 65 years of age or older. The average household size was 2.58 and the average family size was 3.03.

The median age in the city was 47 years. 21.8% of residents were under the age of 18; 7.2% were between the ages of 18 and 24; 17.7% were from 25 to 44; 40.4% were from 45 to 64; and 12.9% were 65 years of age or older. The gender makeup of the city was 54.0% male and 46.0% female.

=== 2000 census ===
As of the census of 2000, there were 134 people, 51 households, and 41 families living in the city. The population density was 728.6 inhabitants per square mile (281.3/km^{2}). There were 55 housing units at an average density of 299.1 per square mile (115.5/km^{2}). The racial makeup of the city was 100.00% White. Hispanic or Latino of any race were 0.75% of the population.

There were 51 households, out of which 39.2% had children under the age of 18 living with them, 72.5% were married couples living together, 5.9% had a female householder with no husband present, and 19.6% were non-families. 19.6% of all households were made up of individuals, and 5.9% had someone living alone who was 65 years of age or older. The average household size was 2.63 and the average family size was 3.00.

In the city, the population was spread out, with 24.6% under the age of 18, 10.4% from 18 to 24, 22.4% from 25 to 44, 31.3% from 45 to 64, and 11.2% who were 65 years of age or older. The median age was 42 years. For every 100 females, there were 127.1 males. For every 100 females age 18 and over, there were 114.9 males

The median income for a household in the city was $27,500, and the median income for a family was $27,500. Males had a median income of $22,188 versus $13,125 for females. The per capita income for the city was $13,702. There were 5.0% of families and 6.3% of the population living below the poverty line, including 7.7% of under eighteens and none of those over 64.

== Education ==
The Calamus–Wheatland Community School District operates public schools serving the community. The district was established on July 1, 1990, by the merger of the Calamus and Wheatland school districts. Calamus–Wheatland High School is the local high school.
