= Buena Vista, Iowa =

- unincorporated community
- Interactive map of Buena Vista, Iowa
- Coordinates: 41°44′30″N 90°44′25″W
- Country: United States
- State: Iowa
- County: Clinton County
- Elevation: 659 ft (201 m)
- Time zone: UTC-6 (Central (CST))
  - Summer (DST): UTC-5 (CDT)
- ZIP code: 52729
- Area code: 563

Buena Vista is an unincorporated community in Clinton County, Iowa, United States, located on the north bank of the Wapsipinicon River, almost 7 miles south of Calamus and two miles east of Dixon. From 1849 to 1914, it had a post office, sited in the southwestern part of Section 9 of Olive Township, at the southeast corner of the intersection of 178th Avenue and 298th Street.

== History ==
According to The History of Clinton County, Iowa (1879),

In 1839, there was a trail known as Boone's Trail, over which a man named Boone drove cattle from Missouri to Galena, by way of Maquoketa. His usual crossing-place on the Wapsie [i.e., the Wapsipinicon River] was on Section 5, Township 80 north, Range 2 east. The first ferryman was an old pioneer of the name of John Shook, who had a small flat-boat which would just take on one team and which was run by a rope. R. I. Jencks succeeded him, whether by purchase or by entry of the landings, is not certainly known. He named the ferry Buena Vista, after that celebrated battle had been fought. He also succeeded in securing a post office here, which was called Buena Vista, which has since been removed to Rothstein's Mill, but still bears the same name. Jencks sold out the ferry franchise to George Atherton in 1849, and a few weeks later he sold out to Dr. Amos Witter, a gentleman who was emigrating to California overland, but when he had reached this point had wearied of his journey. He afterward died in the service as a Brigade Surgeon. Dr. Witter sold out to a man named Edgar, sometime previous to 1854. J. E. McArthur succeeded him and ran the ferry until 1858, when he sold to James Merritt, and, in the spring of 1859, he sold to Jerome Dutton, who continued to operate it until the spring of 1865, when the land on the Clinton County side was sold to J. W. S. Robinson and James Dumphy, Mr. Dutton still owning the lands on the Scott County side, and the ferry was discontinued. This had been one of the most profitable ferries on the Wapsie for many years, and particularly during the Pike's Peak excitement in 1859, but the erection of the Rothstein Bridge destroyed its value. Lyman Alger also had a ferry in this township for many years and is one of the first settlers of record to whom license was issued to keep a ferry across the Wapsie. The Chicago, Iowa & Nebraska Railroad also temporarily operated a ferry for the transfer of passengers on the stage-route until the railroad was completed across the river.
