= Our Savior's Kvindherred Lutheran Church (Calamus, Iowa) =

Historic district in Iowa, United States

- Kvindherred Lutheran Church, School and Cemetery
- U.S. National Register of Historic Places
- U.S. Historic district
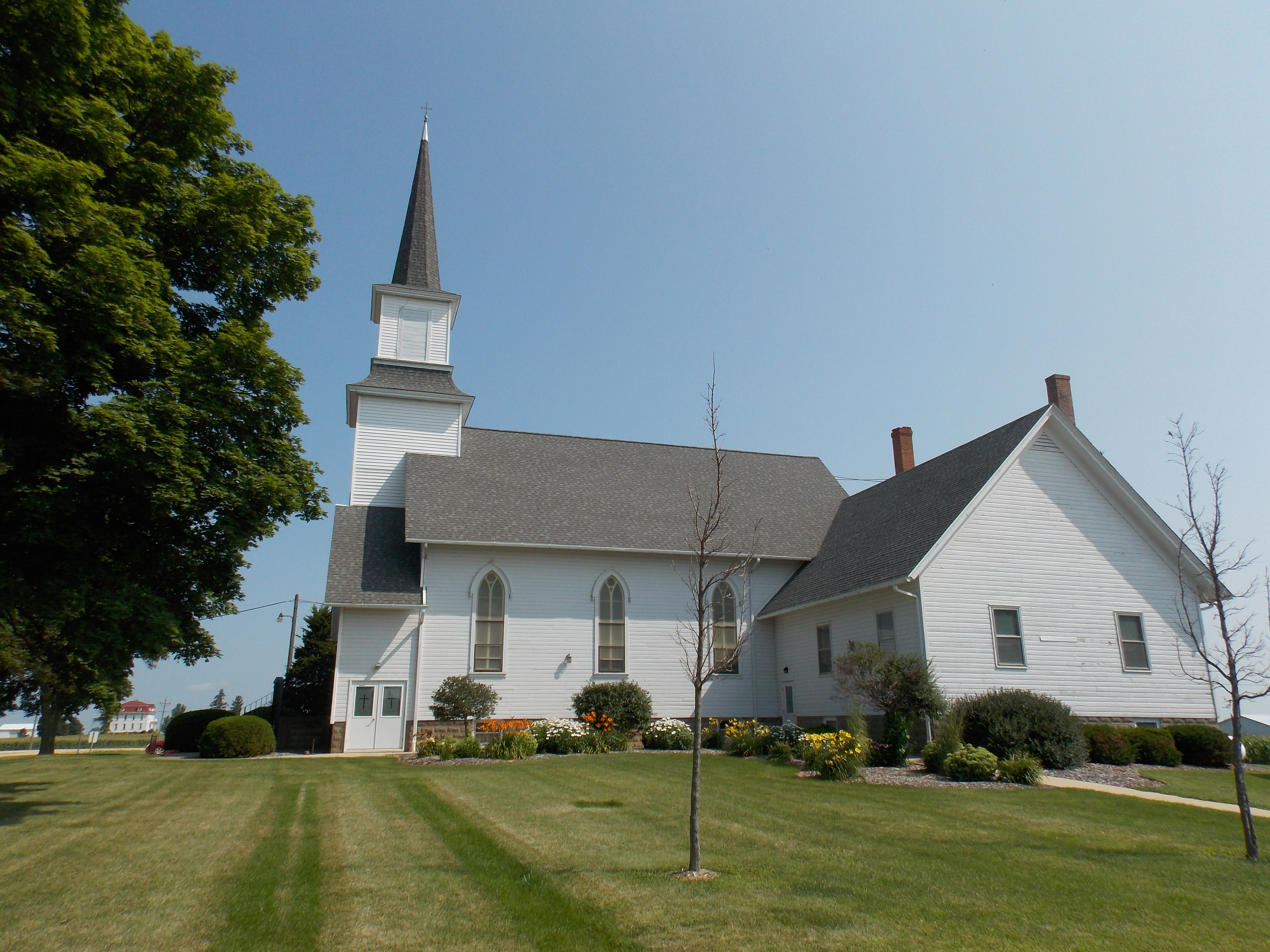
- Our Savior’s Lutheran Church in 2014

- Location within Iowa Location within the United States
- Location: 2589 190th Ave. Calamus, Iowa
- Coordinates: 41°48′26″N 90°43′26″W
- Area: 6.2 acres (2.5 ha)
- Built: 1861 (old church/school); 1877 (church)
- Architect: Cornelius Halvorson
- Architectural style: Greek Revival; Gothic Revival
- MPS: Norwegian Related Resources of Olive Township, Clinton County, Iowa MPS
- NRHP reference No.: 00000922
- Added to NRHP: August 15, 2000

Our Savior's Kvindherred Lutheran Church is an Evangelical Lutheran Church in America congregation located near the town of Calamus in rural Clinton County, Iowa, United States. The church and former school buildings as well as the church cemetery were listed as an historic district on the National Register of Historic Places in 2000.

== History ==
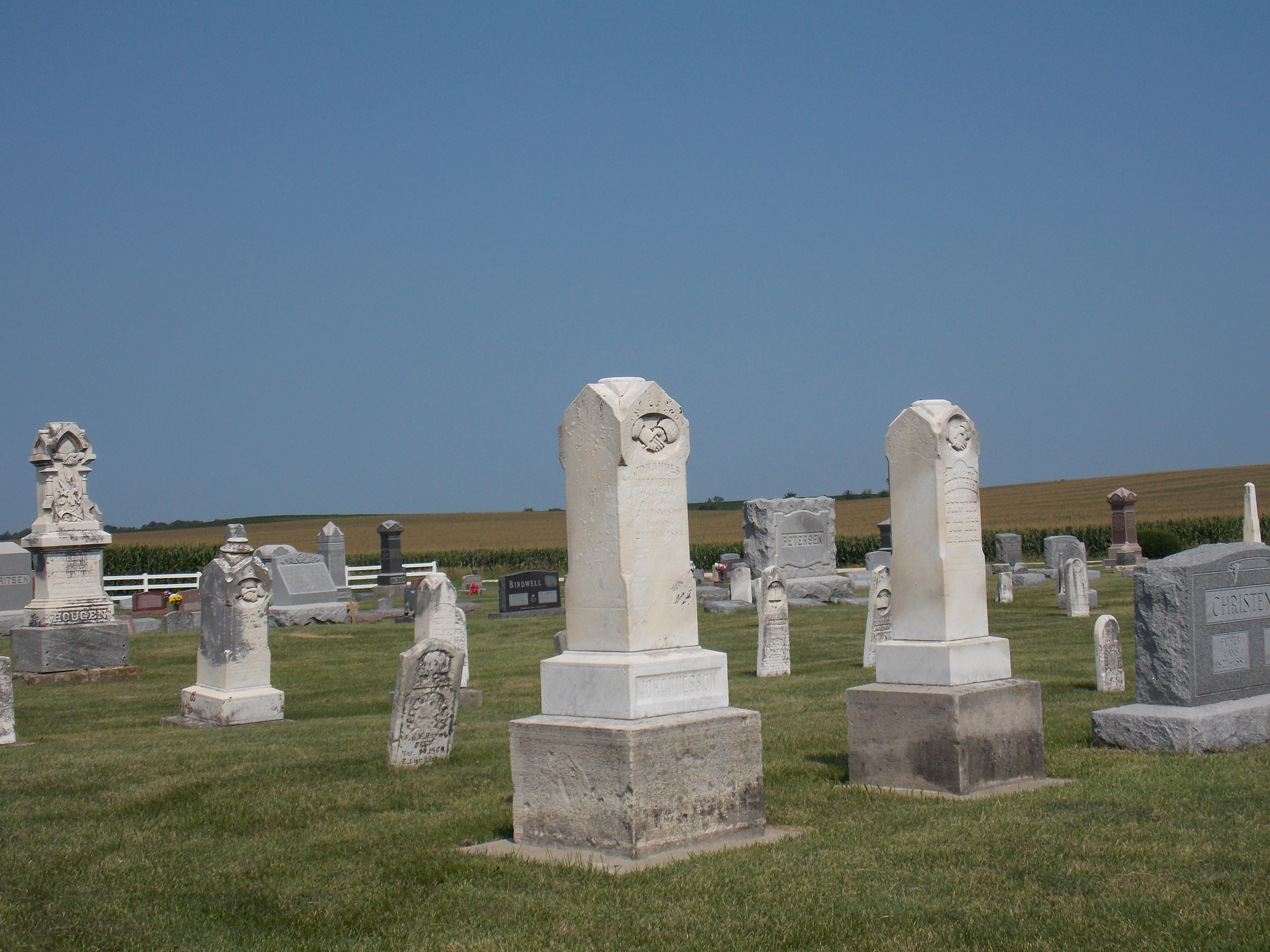
Our Savior's Kvindherred Cemetery

The congregation was established in 1861 by Norwegian immigrants from Hardanger Fjord who settled the area. The church was named after Kvinnherad Municipality in Norway, from where they had emigrated. Services were held in parishioner's homes and in the local public schools until their first church was built in 1865. A parochial school was established in 1863 and instruction was held in parishioner's homes for two years. John Johnson provided the land for the church, which he had purchased in 1853. His brother George provided the land for the cemetery in 1865. That same year, Kvindherred joined with a congregation near Marengo, Iowa, and another in Norway, Iowa, to form a single parish. Kvindherred bought 40 acres (16 ha) a 1/2 mile (0.80 km) west of the church on which to build a parsonage for the pastor who would serve all three locations. The house, no longer extant, was built in 1870. Because of growth in the congregation the present church was built in 1876. Sunday School classes were begun in 1891. The 1870 parsonage was sold in 1928 when the congregation bought a house in Calamus for the parsonage. Two years later Kvindherred called its own pastor, and services were held in the church weekly instead of on alternate Sundays. Services in Norwegian were also ended in 1930 because some members of the congregation did not know the language and pressure resulting from World War I for "foreign-born and users of a foreign language to use more readily the English language." Norwegian had been used exclusively until 1919 for worship and school when English was included.

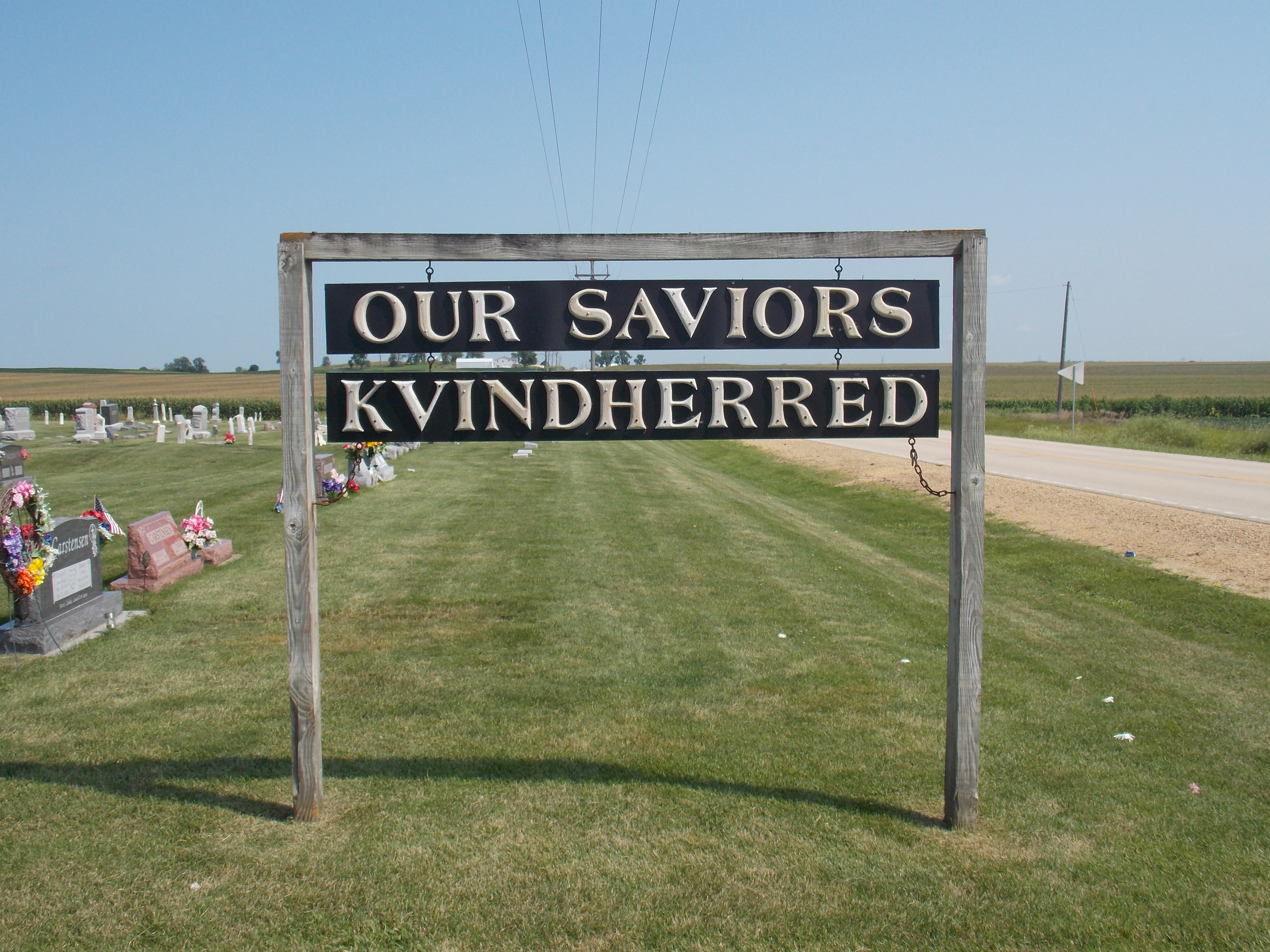
Cemetery sign

The congregation changed its name to Our Savior's Lutheran Church in 1946, which distanced it further from its Norwegian roots. The following year, discussions began about whether to remodel the church or to build a new one. A joint decision could not be made and 136 parishioners and the pastor formed Faith Lutheran congregation in Calamus in 1950. The current parsonage was built near the church in 1952. Faith and Our Savior entered into a cooperative ministry agreement in 1972 by which they would share a pastor. The two congregations are referred to jointly as the Calamus Lutheran Parish.

The congregation initially belonged to the Norwegian Evangelical Lutheran Church until 1898 when it joined the United Norwegian Synod. The synod merged with the original Norwegian Synod and the Hauge Synod to form the Norwegian Lutheran Church of America (NLCA) in 1917. The NLCA changed its name to the Evangelical Lutheran Church in 1946, and ultimately merged into the Evangelical Lutheran Church of America (ELCA) in 1988.

== First Kvindherred church and school ==
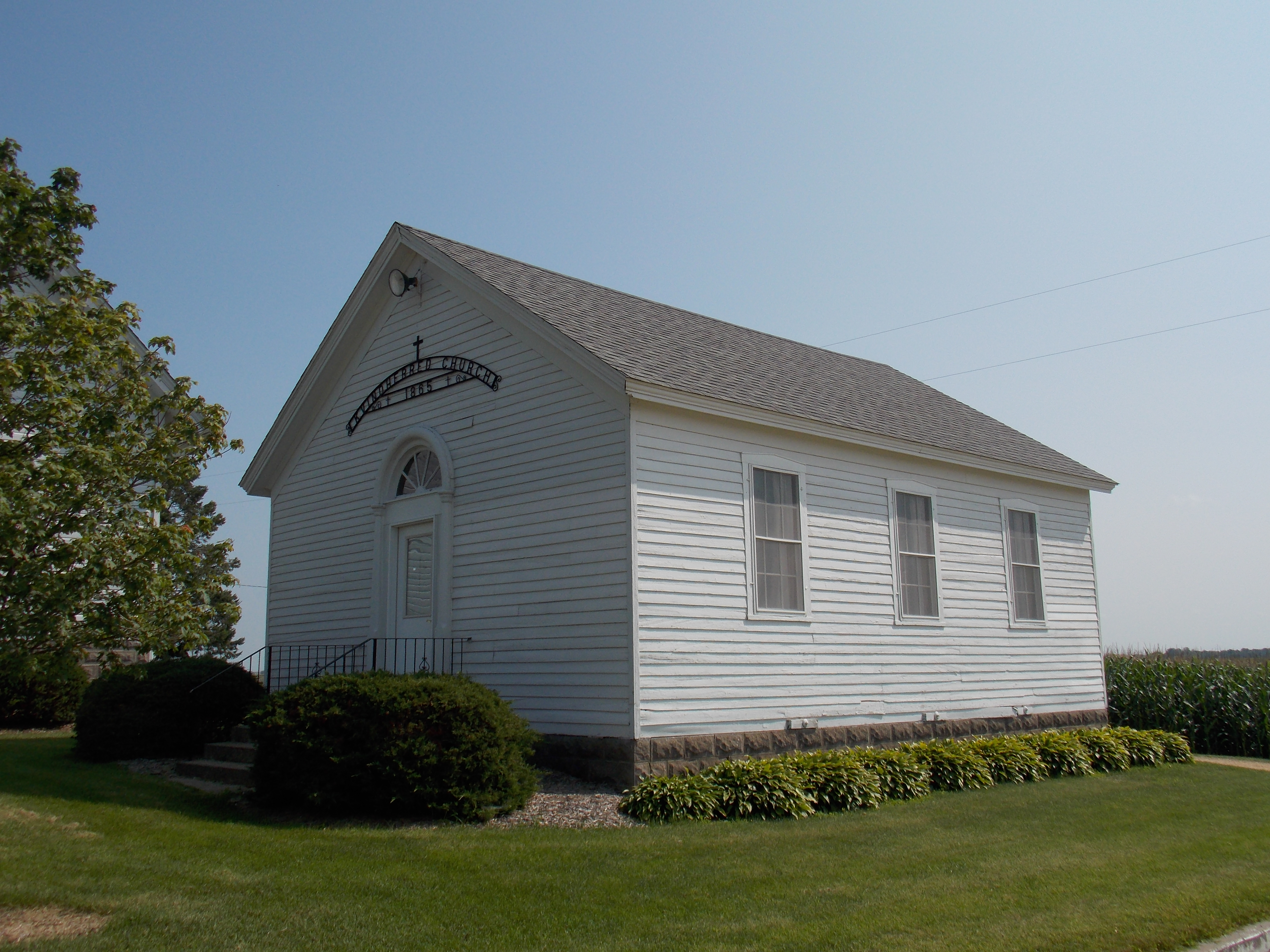
1865 Kvindherred Church and school

The first Kvindherred church building was moved to its present location about 1940. It was originally built 750 feet (230 m) to the south at the northwest corner of what is now 190th Avenue and 260th Street. It was built in 1865 to house both the church and parochial school. It continued to serve as the school after the current church was completed in 1877. It is a 24-by-30-foot (7.3 by 9.1 m) frame building in the Greek Revival style. The front gable structure features engaged columns and capitals below a fanlight that frames the main entrance. The metal lettering that identifies the building is not original. The interior features pine flooring and the original pews from the 1877 church.

== Second church ==
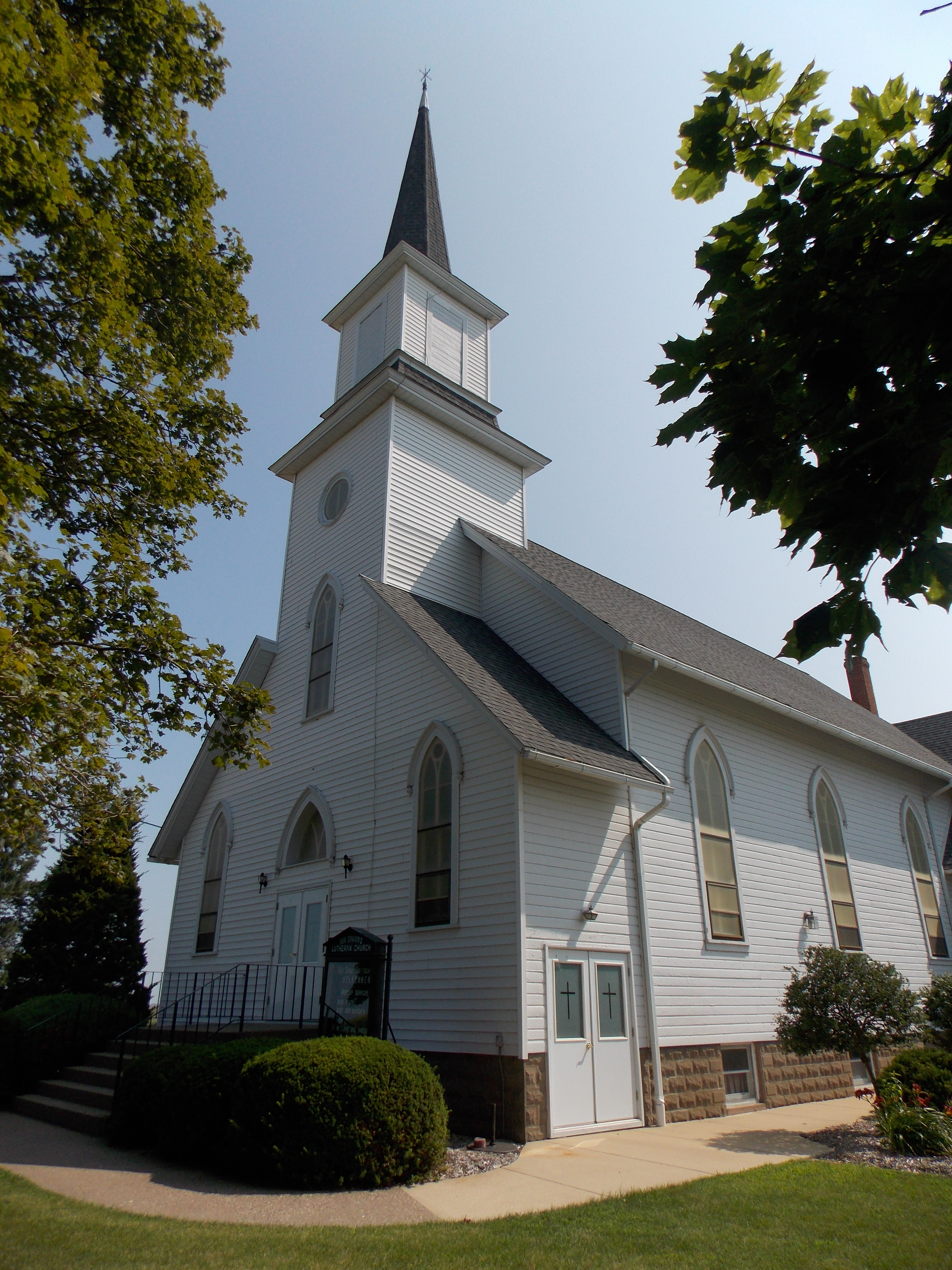
Church façade

The present church was built from 1876 to 1877 and an addition was added in the early 1950s. The original portion of the building is a rectangular frame structure that measures 34 by 56 feet (10 by 17 m). It was designed in the Gothic Revival style that was typical of rural Norwegian Lutherans in the Midwest. In 1912, a full basement with rusticated concrete block walls was added to the church. The main façade features a bell tower capped with a spire. The main entrance and vestibule are located on the main floor of the tower. The vestibule was enlarged in the early 1950s. The two windows that flanked the tower were added to the vestibule at that time. A 30-by-31-foot (9.1 by 9.4 m) addition was built onto the rear of the church in the 1950s as well. Originally clad in wood, the exterior has been covered with white metal siding.

The interior was also remodeled as a part of the same project in the early 1950s. The pews and altar appointments were changed at that time. The pressed metal ceiling was added during the 1912 renovation. The gallery and the elaborate compound moldings surrounding the windows are original to the structure.

== Cemetery ==
The cemetery is a rectangular parcel of land that measures 348 by 446 feet (106 by 136 m), and contains roughly 3.1 acres (1.3 ha). The original section was deeded to the church in 1865, although the first burial was recorded in 1864. The earliest grave marker, however, dates from 1861. Several large cedar trees were located in the cemetery that marked it out from the farmland that surrounds the cemetery. It was originally surrounded by a steel fence with an entrance gateway. Above the gate was a sign that read "Kvindherred Cemetery". It was replaced by a wooden sign along the road in front of the cemetery that reads "Our Saviors Kvindherred". The cemetery is located 1,700 feet (520 m) north of the church along the same road.
