= Calamus–Wheatland Community School District =

School district in Iowa

Coordinates: 41.837956°N 90.838719°W

Location
- Wheatland, Iowa Clinton County and Scott County United States
- Coordinates: 41.837956, -90.838719

District information
- Type: Local school district
- Grades: K-12
- Established: 1990
- Superintendent: Lonnie Luepker
- Schools: 2
- Budget: $7,006,000 (2020-21)
- NCES District ID: 1906000

Students and staff
- Students: 414 (2022-23)
- Teachers: 39.80 FTE
- Staff: 43.79 FTE
- Student–teacher ratio: 10.40
- Athletic conference: Tri-Rivers
- District mascot: Warriors
- Colors: Navy and Silver

Other information
- Website: www.cal-wheat.k12.ia.us

Calamus–Wheatland Community School District is a rural public school district headquartered in Wheatland, Iowa.

Most of the district is in Clinton County with a portion in Scott County. The district serves Wheatland, Calamus, and Toronto. It also includes the Big Rock census-designated place.

== Schools ==
- Calamus–Wheatland Elementary Attendance Center
- Calamus–Wheatland High School.

== History ==
The district was established on July 1, 1990, by the merger of the Calamus and Wheatland school districts.
