= Wheatland, Iowa =

- City
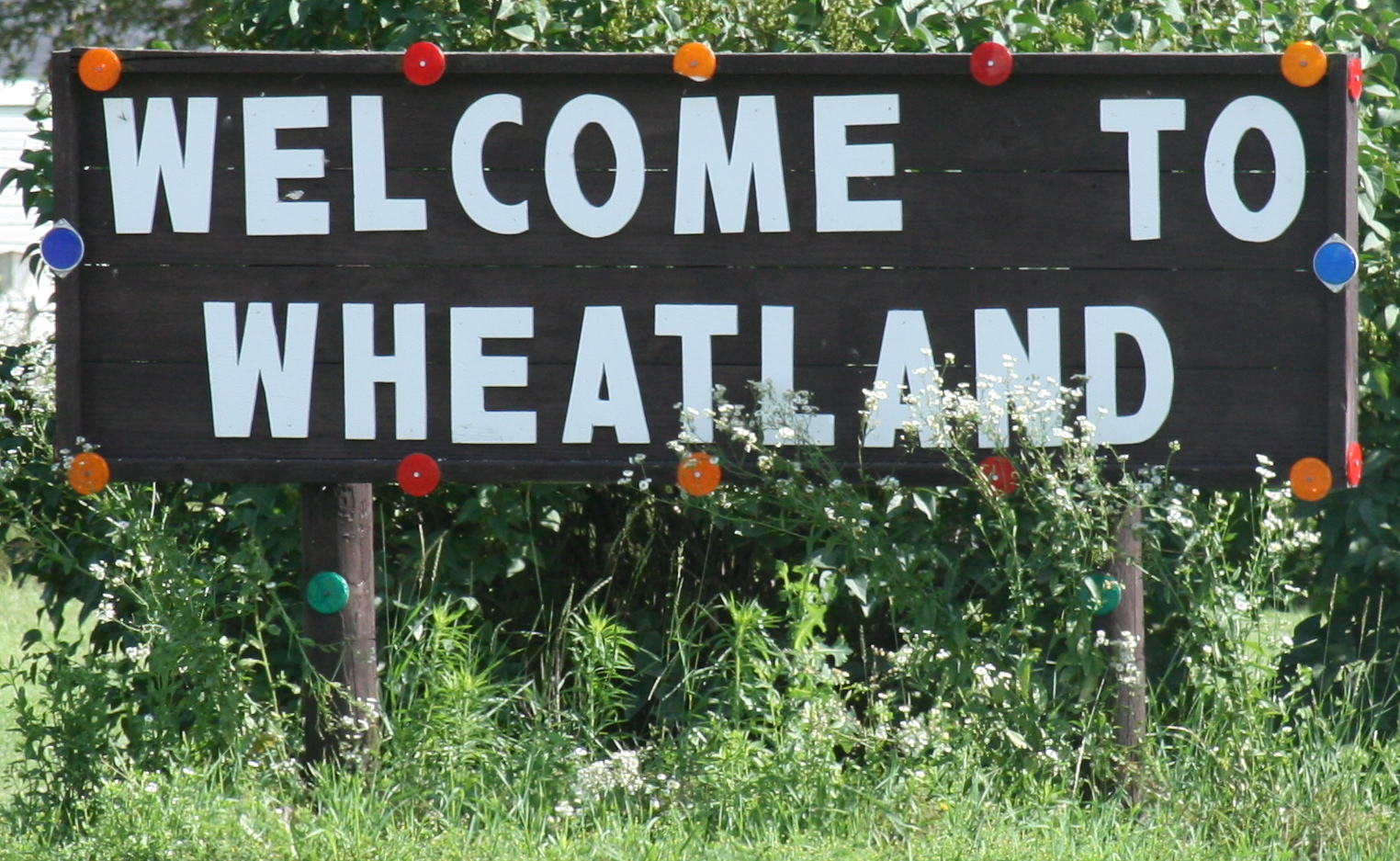
- Wheatland welcome sign

- Location of Wheatland, Iowa
- Coordinates: 41°49′59″N 90°50′17″W
- Country: United States
- State: Iowa
- County: Clinton

Area
  - Total: 0.58 sq mi (1.49 km^{2})
  - Land: 0.58 sq mi (1.49 km^{2})
  - Water: 0 sq mi (0.00 km^{2})
- Elevation: 692 ft (211 m)

Population (2020)
  - Total: 775
  - Density: 1,351.0/sq mi (521.63/km^{2})
- Time zone: UTC-6 (Central (CST))
  - Summer (DST): UTC-5 (CDT)
- ZIP code: 52777
- Area code: 563
- FIPS code: 19-84945
- GNIS feature ID: 2397292
- Website: www.cityofwheatland.org

Wheatland is a city in Clinton County, Iowa, United States. The population was 775 at the time of the 2020 census.

== History ==
Wheatland was platted in 1858 under the leadership of John Bennett. The town was named for President James Buchanan's estate Wheatland in Lancaster, Pennsylvania. The entire township (Spring Rock) had a white population of only 101 in 1850, but that number rose to 756 in 1860. A significant body of early settlers all came from the village of Wunderthausen in central Germany. The Germans founded the first church in town in 1857 with a Presbyterian affiliation. This relationship was dissolved in 1861 with the incorporation of St. Paul's German Reformed Church (now St. Paul's United Church of Christ). The First Presbyterian Church was organized in 1858, though no longer functions. Wheatland was legally incorporated on July 13, 1869.

== Geography ==
According to the United States Census Bureau, the city has a total area of 0.61 square miles (1.58 km^{2}), all land.

== Demographics ==
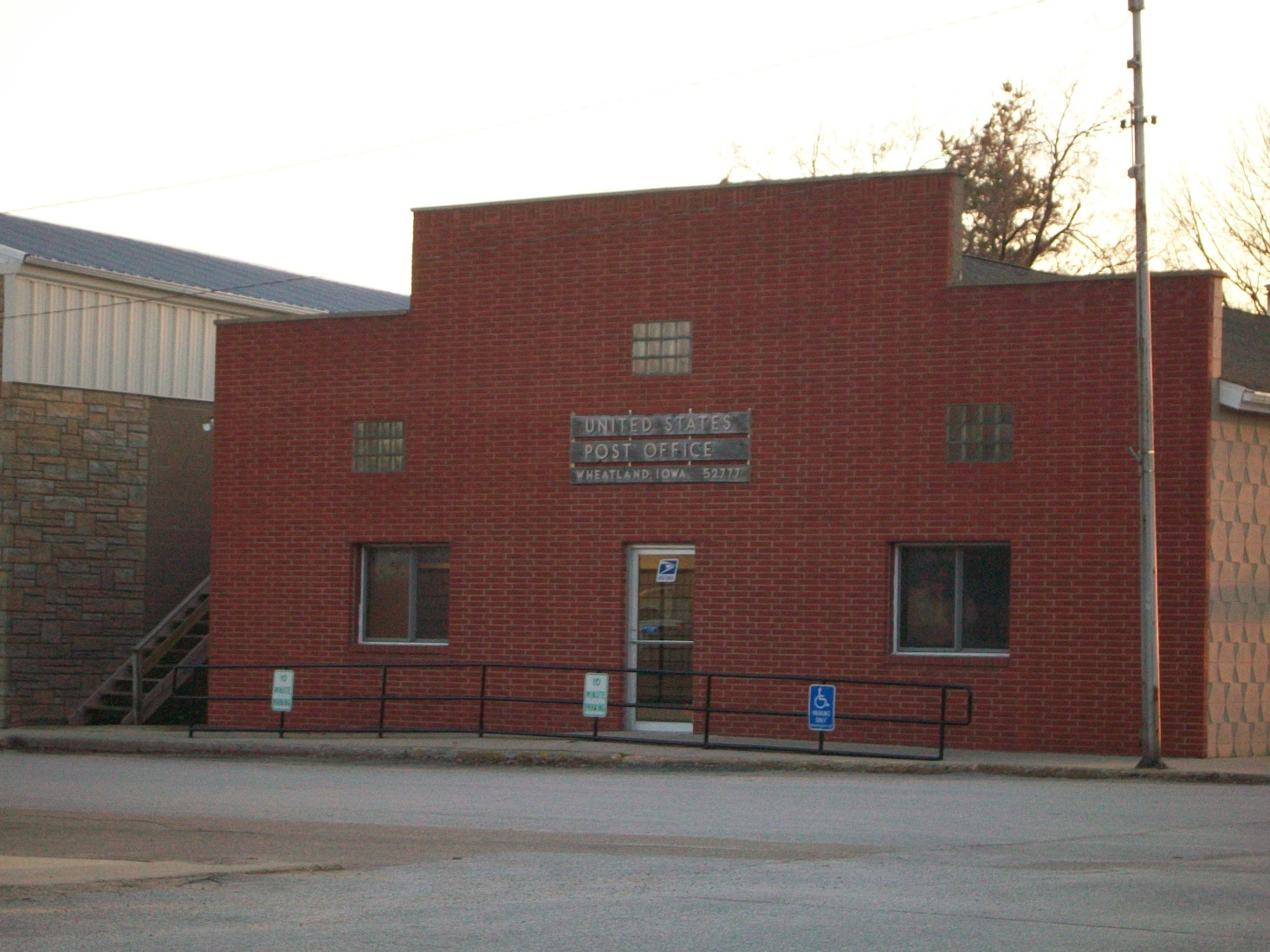
Wheatland Post Office

Historical population
Census	Pop.	Note	%±
1870	788		—
1880	616		−21.8%
1890	569		−7.6%
1900	475		−16.5%
1910	539		13.5%
1920	549		1.9%
1930	539		−1.8%
1940	535		−0.7%
1950	568		6.2%
1960	643		13.2%
1970	832		29.4%
1980	840		1.0%
1990	723		−13.9%
2000	772		6.8%
2010	764		−1.0%
2020	775		1.4%
U.S. Decennial Census

=== 2020 census ===
As of the census of 2020, there were 775 people, 317 households, and 184 families residing in the city. The population density was 1,351.0 inhabitants per square mile (521.6/km^{2}). There were 339 housing units at an average density of 591.0 per square mile (228.2/km^{2}). The racial makeup of the city was 95.7% White, 0.0% Black or African American, 0.3% Native American, 0.1% Asian, 0.0% Pacific Islander, 0.6% from other races and 3.2% from two or more races. Hispanic or Latino persons of any race comprised 1.3% of the population.

Of the 317 households, 32.8% of which had children under the age of 18 living with them, 38.8% were married couples living together, 11.0% were cohabitating couples, 27.4% had a female householder with no spouse or partner present and 22.7% had a male householder with no spouse or partner present. 42.0% of all households were non-families. 34.4% of all households were made up of individuals, 19.2% had someone living alone who was 65 years old or older.

The median age in the city was 35.9 years. 28.8% of the residents were under the age of 20; 5.3% were between the ages of 20 and 24; 25.5% were from 25 and 44; 19.4% were from 45 and 64; and 21.0% were 65 years of age or older. The gender makeup of the city was 47.4% male and 52.6% female.

=== 2010 census ===
As of the census of 2010, there were 764 people, 294 households, and 197 families living in the city. The population density was 1,252.5 inhabitants per square mile (483.6/km^{2}). There were 317 housing units at an average density of 519.7 per square mile (200.7/km^{2}). The racial makeup of the city was 98.7% White, 0.3% African American, 0.7% Native American, 0.1% Asian, and 0.3% from two or more races. Hispanic or Latino of any race were 1.7% of the population.

There were 294 households, of which 34.7% had children under the age of 18 living with them, 48.0% were married couples living together, 12.2% had a female householder with no husband present, 6.8% had a male householder with no wife present, and 33.0% were non-families. 27.9% of all households were made up of individuals, and 14% had someone living alone who was 65 years of age or older. The average household size was 2.47 and the average family size was 2.98.

The median age in the city was 40.6 years. 26.8% of residents were under the age of 18; 6.2% were between the ages of 18 and 24; 23.4% were from 25 to 44; 23.6% were from 45 to 64; and 20% were 65 years of age or older. The gender makeup of the city was 46.9% male and 53.1% female.

=== 2000 census ===
As of the census of 2000, there were 772 people, 300 households, and 207 families living in the city. The population density was 1,389.8 inhabitants per square mile (536.6/km^{2}). There were 316 housing units at an average density of 568.9 per square mile (219.7/km^{2}). The racial makeup of the city was 98.58% White, 0.26% African American, 0.13% Asian, and 1.04% from two or more races. Hispanic or Latino of any race were 0.52% of the population.

There were 300 households, out of which 31.3% had children under the age of 18 living with them, 54.3% were married couples living together, 12.3% had a female householder with no husband present, and 31.0% were non-families. 28.3% of all households were made up of individuals, and 18.0% had someone living alone who was 65 years of age or older. The average household size was 2.42 and the average family size was 2.99.

27.2% are under the age of 18, 6.2% from 18 to 24, 23.2% from 25 to 44, 20.6% from 45 to 64, and 22.8% who were 65 years of age or older. The median age was 39 years. For every 100 females, there were 80.0 males. For every 100 females age 18 and over, there were 75.1 males.

The median income for a household in the city was $30,875, and the median income for a family was $36,528. Males had a median income of $32,292 versus $20,972 for females. The per capita income for the city was $13,824. About 8.7% of families and 13.8% of the population were below the poverty line, including 20.7% of those under age 18 and 14.1% of those age 65 or over.

== Education ==
The Calamus–Wheatland Community School District operates public schools serving the community. The district was established on July 1, 1985, by the merger of the Calamus and Wheatland school districts. Calamus–Wheatland High School in Wheatland is a comprehensive four year high school.

== Notable person ==
- Elmer George Homrighausen (1900–1982), Dean of Princeton Theological Seminary from 1954 to 1970.
