= National Register of Historic Places listings in Jones County, Iowa =

Location of Jones County in Iowa

This is a list of the National Register of Historic Places listings in Jones County, Iowa.

This is intended to be a complete list of the properties and districts on the National Register of Historic Places in Jones County, Iowa, United States. Latitude and longitude coordinates are provided for many National Register properties and districts; these locations may be seen together in a map.

There are 29 properties and districts listed on the National Register in the county.

This National Park Service list is complete through NPS recent listings posted March 14, 2025.

	Name on the Register	Image	Date listed	Location	City or town	Description
1	Anamosa Main Street Historic District	Anamosa Main Street Historic District	January 29, 2009 (#08001381)	200 and 300 blocks of W. Main St., 100 block of E. Main St., 100 blocks of N. and S. Ford St., and 100 block of N. Garnavillo St. 42°06′30″N 91°17′13″W	Anamosa	
2	Anamosa Public Library	Anamosa Public Library	May 23, 1983 (#83000380)	100 E. 1st St. 42°06′24″N 91°17′07″W	Anamosa	
3	Antioch School	Antioch School	January 16, 2001 (#00001654)	Iowa Highway 64, 4 miles (6.4 km) east of Anamosa; 42°05′07″N 91°12′50″W	Anamosa	
4	Edmund and Mary Ann Walworth Booth House	Edmund and Mary Ann Walworth Booth House	March 13, 2013 (#13000067)	125 S. Ford St. 42°06′28″N 91°17′08″W	Anamosa	
5	Business Part of Olin Historic District	Business Part of Olin Historic District	November 12, 2014 (#14000907)	Both sides of 300 blk. of E. Jackson and portion of E. 2nd Sts. 41°59′53″N 91°08′30″W	Olin	
6	Dr. Martin H. Caulkins House and Office	Dr. Martin H. Caulkins House and Office	March 5, 1982 (#82002625)	Washington and Main Sts. 42°03′30″N 91°00′16″W	Wyoming	
7	Corbett's/Eby's Mill Bridge	Corbett's/Eby's Mill Bridge	April 11, 1985 (#85000722)	Spans the Maquoketa River; 42°11′59″N 91°03′32″W	Scotch Grove Township	
8	Ely's Stone Bridge	Ely's Stone Bridge	March 7, 1979 (#79000908)	Northwest of Monticello at Hardscrabble Rd. 42°15′24″N 91°13′31″W	Monticello	
9	Farm Creek Historic District		March 15, 2016 (#16000083)	Address restricted	Cascade vicinity	
10	Farm No. 1, Iowa Men's Reformatory	Farm No. 1, Iowa Men's Reformatory	December 18, 1992 (#92001664)	County Trunk Highway E28 west of Buffalo Creek; 42°06′33″N 91°18′08″W	Anamosa	
11	S.S. Farwell House	S.S. Farwell House	April 27, 1979 (#79000909)	301 N. Chestnut St. 42°14′31″N 91°11′39″W	Monticello	
12	Fremont Mill Bridge	Fremont Mill Bridge	May 15, 1998 (#98000537)	Pedestrian path over a small pond in Central Park; 42°06′39″N 91°08′22″W	Anamosa	
13	John A. Green Estate	John A. Green Estate	August 31, 1978 (#78001232)	West of Anamosa off U.S. Route 151; 42°06′40″N 91°21′05″W	Anamosa	
14	Hale Bridge	Hale Bridge	May 15, 1998 (#98000539)	100th St. over the Wapsipinicon River above Oxford Junction; 42°00′16″N 91°03′54″W	Anamosa	
15	Iowa Men's Reformatory Cemetery	Iowa Men's Reformatory Cemetery	December 18, 1992 (#92001665)	County Trunk Highway E28 west of Buffalo Creek; 42°06′43″N 91°18′32″W	Anamosa	
16	Iowa Men's Reformatory Historic District	Iowa Men's Reformatory Historic District	December 18, 1992 (#92001667)	N. High St. 42°06′41″N 91°17′27″W	Anamosa	
17	Jones County Court House	Jones County Court House	August 28, 2003 (#03000822)	500 W. Main St. 42°06′34″N 91°17′24″W	Anamosa	
18	Kenny Farmstead Archeological District		March 15, 2016 (#16000082)	Address restricted	Cascade vicinity	
19	Lower Road Bridge	Lower Road Bridge	May 15, 1998 (#98000536)	Buffalo Rd. over a branch of the Wapsipinicon River; 42°06′53″N 91°18′21″W	Anamosa	
20	Moore's Ford Bridge		May 15, 1998 (#98000538)	25th Ave. over White Water Creek; 42°16′47″N 90°55′40″W	Monticello	
21	Odd Fellows Hall	Odd Fellows Hall	June 27, 1985 (#85001377)	203 W. 1st St. 42°14′16″N 91°11′27″W	Monticello	
22	Rick's Brewery	Rick's Brewery	March 12, 1999 (#99000312)	12412 Buffalo Rd. 42°06′48″N 91°18′00″W	Anamosa	
23	St. Joseph's Roman Catholic Church	St. Joseph's Roman Catholic Church	August 24, 2005 (#05000904)	12472 County Road X28; 42°07′06″N 91°21′39″W	Stone City	
24	St. Luke's Methodist Church	St. Luke's Methodist Church	January 17, 2002 (#01001461)	211 N. Sycamore; 42°14′26″N 91°11′18″W	Monticello	
25	Scotch Grove Historic District	Scotch Grove Historic District	February 5, 2014 (#13001137)	Junction of Iowa Highway 38, 116th Avenue, and County Road E17; 42°10′21″N 91°06′26″W	Scotch Grove	
26	Col. William T. and Elizabeth C. Shaw House	Col. William T. and Elizabeth C. Shaw House	November 27, 1992 (#92001636)	509 S. Oak St. 42°06′07″N 91°16′18″W	Anamosa	
27	State Quarry, Iowa Men's Reformatory		December 18, 1992 (#92001666)	Unnamed road along the eastern side of Buffalo Creek northwest of Anamosa; 42°07′23″N 91°19′08″W	Anamosa	
28	Stone City Historic District	Stone City Historic District	November 21, 2008 (#08001099)	12828-12573 Stone City Rd., 12392-12340 Dearborn Rd., and 12381-12551 County Road X28; 42°06′54″N 91°21′17″W	Stone City	
29	Wapsipinicon State Park Historic District	Wapsipinicon State Park Historic District	September 22, 2014 (#14000669)	21301 Cty. Rd. E34; 42°05′43″N 91°17′08″W	Anamosa	

== See also ==
- List of National Historic Landmarks in Iowa
- National Register of Historic Places listings in Iowa
- Listings in neighboring counties: Cedar, Clinton, Delaware, Dubuque, Jackson, Linn
