= Cycle Gear =

American online motorcycle gear retailer

Cycle Gear, Inc.
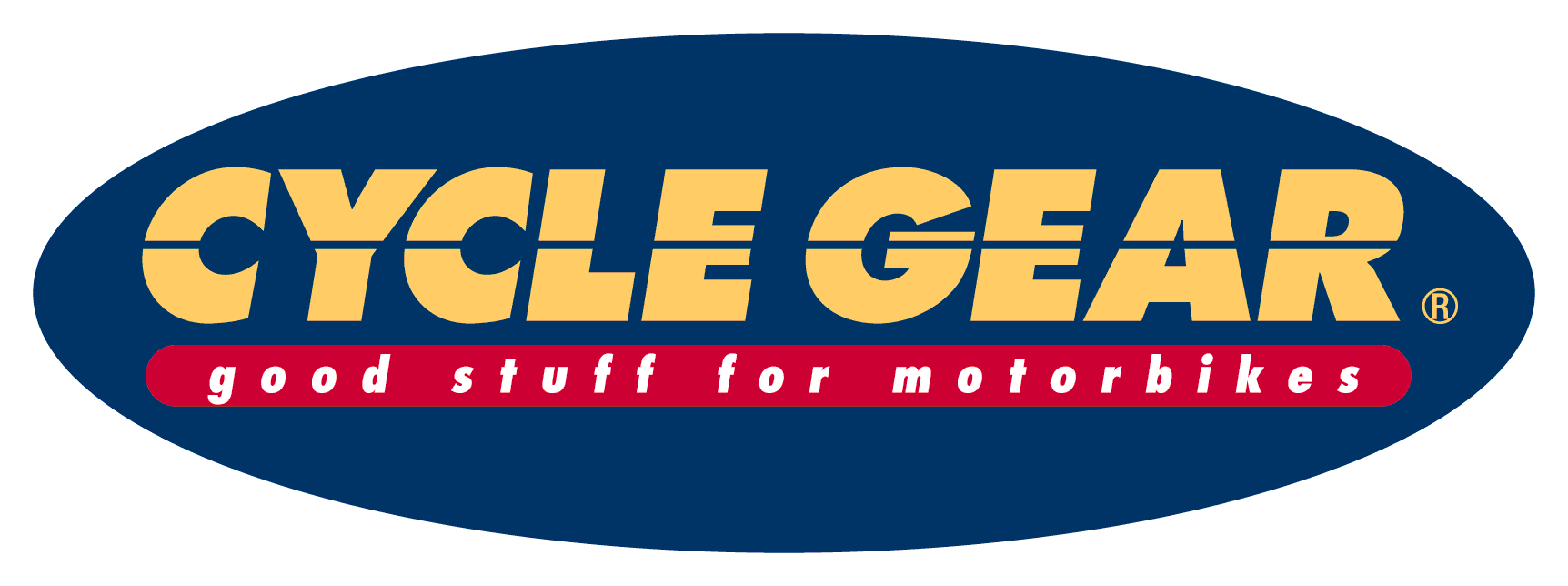
- Type: Private
- Industry: E-commerce; Motorcycle components Motorcycle accessories Retail
- Founded: 1974; 52 years ago in Benicia, California, United States
- Founder: Donald Martin; Dave Bertram
- Headquarters: Benicia, California
- Number of locations: 165 stores (as of March 2024)
- Area served: Worldwide
- Key people: Zach Parham CEO
- Brands: BILT; Sedici; Street and Steel; Hot-wired
- Number of employees: 3000
- Parent: Comoto Holdings
- Website: cyclegear.com

Cycle Gear is a motorcycle accessories retailer featuring 165 stores in 39 states and an e-commerce website. The company is headquartered in Benicia, California. The business was founded in 1974 by Ron Merrit, Frank Klobas and Richard Christian. The company founded the BILT and Sedici helmet brands in 2011. The company also founded Street and Steel and Hot-wired brands. In 2016, the company merged with RevZilla under the conglomerate Comoto Holdings Inc. Four years later the group acquired two more companies J&P Cycles and Rever. Each company functions independently as a sister company.

== History ==
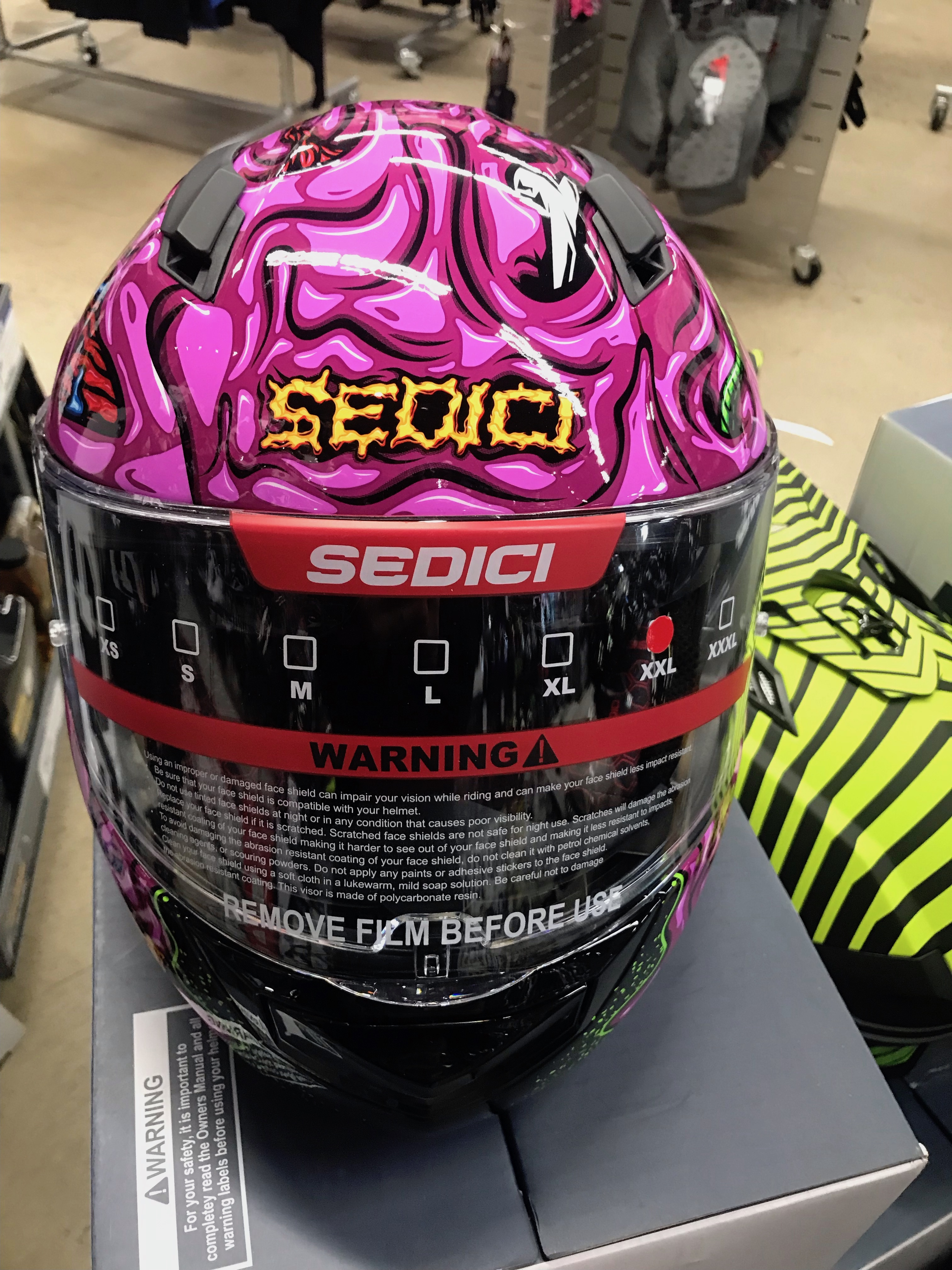
Sedici helmet example

The company founded its first store in 1974 in Richmond, California in the North Bay region of the San Francisco Bay Area by Ron Merrit, Frank Klobas and Richard Christian. The company featured a catalog from the 1970s and by 1992 there were six stores in the San Francisco Bay Area. In 1999, the company continued growing to about ten locations and featured the Frank Thomas Collection one of the best-known British motorcycling clothing brands, four years later in 2001 the company grew to eighteen stores. The company established the ecommerce website cyclegear.com by 2003 and in 2008, Cycle Gear grew to 100 stores across the United States. By 2011, Cycle Gear introduced two helmet brands BILT and Sedici. The company also introduced Street and Steel and Hot-wired brands. In 2016, before RevZilla and Cycle Gear were merged by Comoto Holdings Inc. the company grew to 112 stores in 34 states, had a significant and growing online business, and distributed over 13 million catalogs annually. After the merger Bertram retired as CEO. As of March 2024, the company has grown to 165 stores in 39 states and employs 3000 people.

== Helmets ==
Cycle Gear founded two motorcycle helmet brands: BILT and Sedici in 2011. Cycle Gear created designs and worked directly with manufacturers in countries like China and Pakistan to remove the middleman. Originally, the brand offered a five-year warranty on BILT brands and a lifetime warranty on Sedici helmets. Sedici means 16 in Italian; Sedici was considered a higher-end, European-inspired line guaranteed for life. One year after the merger of Cycle Gear and RevZilla around May 2017, Comoto Holdings changed the BILT brand's warranty from five years to one year, and the Sedici lifetime warranty was changed to two years.

Several recalls have been issued for Bilt helmets including certain BILT Amped and Grommet helmets. On January 13, 2023, Comoto Holdings, Inc. issued a safety recall on specific models of the BILT helmets specifically for the BILT Vertex helmets produced after September 1, 2021, and BILT Route helmets produced after March 1, 2020. A Safety Recall Report was issued by the National Highway Traffic Safety Administration for roughly 18,980 helmets. The helmets did not provide impact protection in the event of a crash, which increased the rider's risk of head injury. The helmets suffered penetration test failures during independent testing, which did not comply with U.S. Department of Transportation standards.

== See also ==
- National Motorcycle Museum (Anamosa, Iowa)
- Shoei
- Arai Helmet
- Bell Sports
- AGV
- Nolan Helmets
