= Lower Road Bridge =

- U.S. National Register of Historic Places
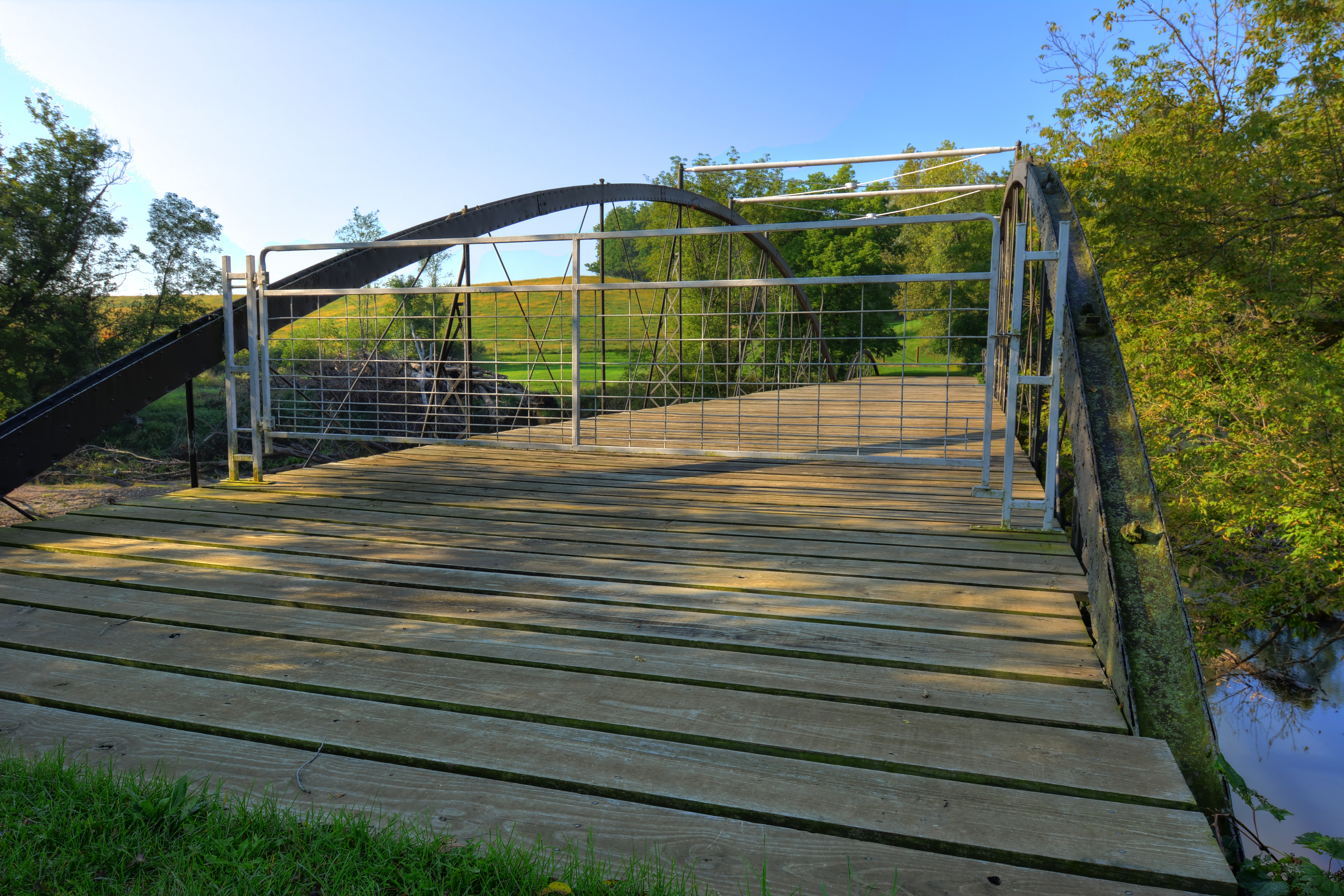

- Location within Iowa Location within the United States
- Location: Buffalo Rd. over a branch of the Wapsipinicon River
- Nearest city: Anamosa, Iowa
- Coordinates: 42°06′53.2″N 91°18′21.2″W
- Built: 1878
- Built by: King Iron Bridge and Manufacturing Co.
- Architectural style: Bowstring through arch-truss
- MPS: Highway Bridges of Iowa MPS
- NRHP reference No.: 98000536
- Added to NRHP: May 15, 1998

Lower Road Bridge is a historic structure located northwest of Anamosa, Iowa, United States. It spans Buffalo Creek for 160 feet (49 m). The King Iron Bridge and Manufacturing Co. of Cleveland erected a bowstring through arch truss and a shorter pony arch in 1878 for what was historically called Lower Road. The bridge's superstructure consists of a large stone masonry pier and abutments. It was listed on the National Register of Historic Places in 1998. The county abandoned the bridge and it is now privately owned.

== See also ==
- List of bridges on the National Register of Historic Places in Iowa
- National Register of Historic Places listings in Jones County, Iowa
