= RevZilla =

American online motorcycle gear retailer

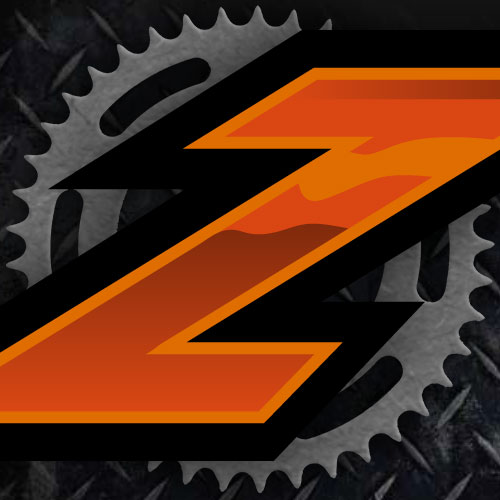
- Company type: Private
- Industry: E-commerce, motor sports
- Founded: November 2007; 17 years ago
- Founders: Nick Auger, Anthony Bucci; Matthew Kull
- Headquarters: Philadelphia, Pennsylvania, U.S.
- Brands: Reax
- Number of employees: 450 (2014)
- Parent: Comoto Holdings
- Website: www.revzilla.com

RevZilla is an online motorcycle gear retailer based in Philadelphia, Pennsylvania, United States. The company sells motorcycle gear, parts and accessories and was founded in 2007. In 2016, the company merged with Cycle Gear under the conglomerate Comoto Holdings Inc. Four years later the group acquired two more companies Rever and J&P Cycles. Each company functions independently as a sister company. In 2017, RevZilla launched its own motorcycle apparel brand call Reax.

== History ==
In November 2007, Nick Auger, Anthony Bucci and Matthew Kull founded RevZilla with an investment of less than $30,000. Together they established RevZilla as an online retailer because of their experience in e-commerce and web development.

At the time, the company had a small store in Queen Village, Philadelphia. In 2008, RevZilla moved its headquarters and store to a warehouse in south Philadelphia.

In 2010, the company had more than $10 million in annual revenue. RevZilla had $20 million in total sales the following year. In 2012, the company doubled in size by adding 25 people to its team and had a revenue of $20 million. The Greater Philadelphia Chamber of Commerce named RevZilla "Emerging Business of the Year" for 2012. The company also opened a warehouse in Las Vegas, Nevada and more than tripled its size in 2018. RevZilla moved its headquarters to the Philadelphia Naval Shipyard in 2013, with a showroom, warehouse and distribution center at the same location.

The Greater Philadelphia Alliance for Capital and Technology named RevZilla "IT Innovator of the Year" in May 2014. By the end of 2014, the company employed 140.

== Description ==
RevZilla operates an e-commerce platform that has apparel, accessories and parts for two, three and four-wheeled motorcycle sport vehicles such as dirt bikes, ATVs, sport bikes, and street bikes. The company's online store was mentioned in the Chicago Tribune as a recommended cycle website by readers and referred to as the "Zappos of motorcycle gear."
