= Newhard =

Newhard is a surname. Notable people with the surname include:

- Peter Newhard (1783–1860), American politician
- Robert Newhard (1884–1945), American cinematographer
- Scott Newhard (born 1951), American politician
