= Corbett's/Eby's Mill Bridge =

- U.S. National Register of Historic Places
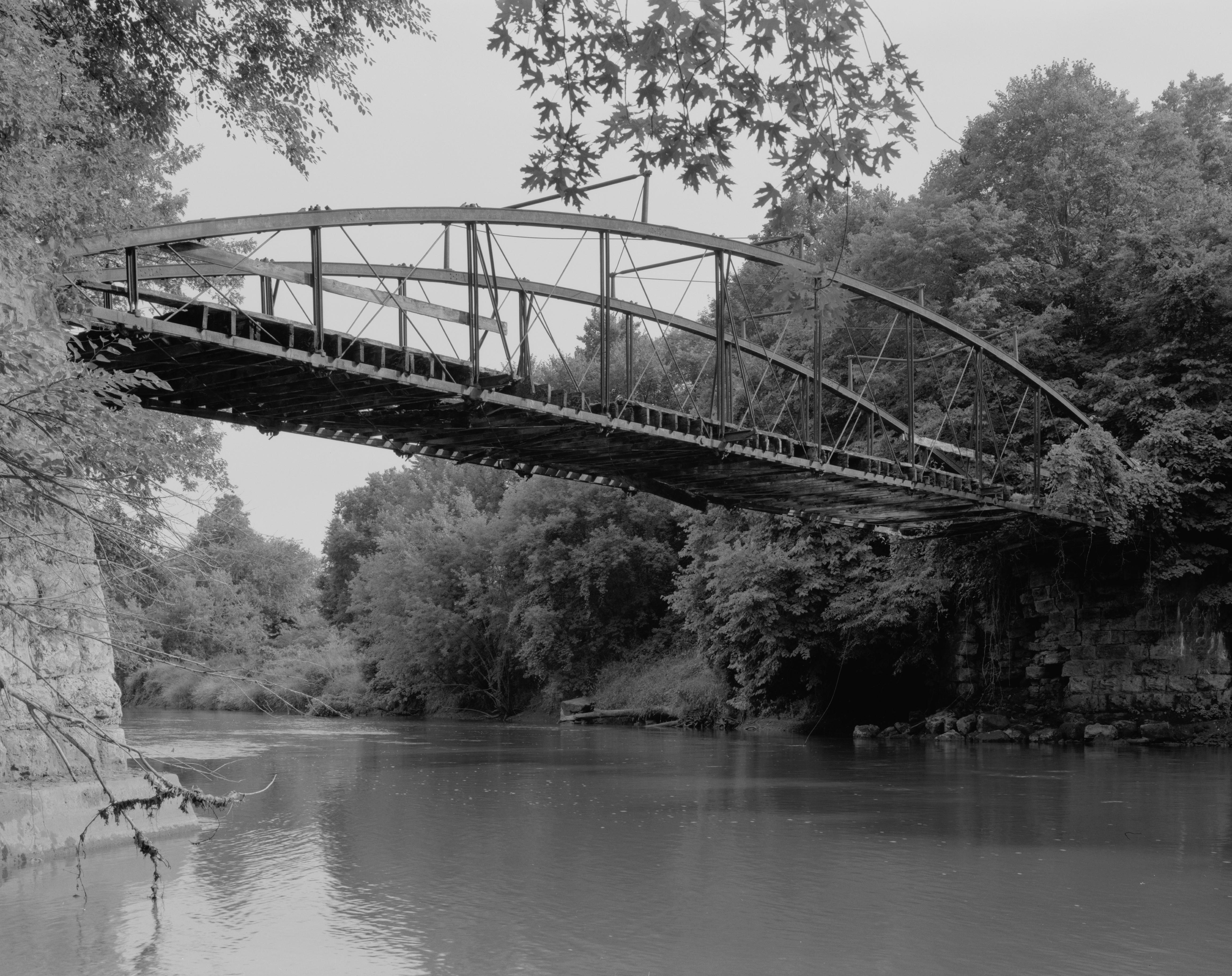
- The Eby's Mill bridge from below the viaduct

- Location within Iowa Location within the United States
- Location: Spans the Maquoketa River
- Nearest city: Scotch Grove, Iowa
- Coordinates: 42°12′0″N 91°03′33.9″W
- Built: 1871
- Built by: Miller, Jamison & Company
- Architectural style: Bowstring truss
- Demolished: 2010
- NRHP reference No.: 85000722
- Added to NRHP: April 11, 1985

The Corbett's/Eby's Mill Bridge was a historic structure located northeast of the unincorporated community of Scotch Grove, Iowa, United States. The ghost town of Ebys Mill was located at the bridge site and was part of the towns traffic sources as it spanned the Maquoketa River for 128 feet (39 m). James S. Applegate established a gristmill near this location in 1858. He was joined by John Corbett, who obtained ownership by 1868 and expanded the operation and added a sawmill. He petitioned the Jones County Board of Supervisors for an iron bridge at this location in 1870. They agreed to pay two-thirds of the construction costs with the final third paid for by local subscriptions. The contract to construct this bridge and a similar span in Monticello was made with Miller, Jamison & Company of Cleveland. Both are single span bowstring truss bridges that were completed in November 1871. This bridge has always been identified with the mill. Samuel Eby acquired it in 1875, and it remained in the family until 1913. The bridge was originally on a loop road that circled behind the mill pond. When County Road X73 was created in 1958 it bypassed the bridge to the south. The bridge was under private ownership up until the end. It was listed on the National Register of Historic Places in 1985. It was destroyed by flooding in 2010

== See also ==
- List of bridges documented by the Historic American Engineering Record in Iowa
- List of bridges on the National Register of Historic Places in Iowa
- National Register of Historic Places listings in Jones County, Iowa
