= Comoto Holdings Inc. =

American motorcycle parts and accessories conglomerate

Comoto Holdings, Inc.
- Industry: E-commerce; Motorcycle components Motorcycle accessories
- Founded: February 2016; 10 years ago
- Founders: Nick Auger, Anthony Bucci; Matthew Kull; J.W. Childs
- Headquarters: Philadelphia, Pennsylvania
- Area served: Worldwide
- Key people: Zach Parham (Chairman & CEO)
- Brands: BILT; Sedici; Street and Steel; Reax; Hot-wired
- Subsidiaries: Cycle Gear; RevZilla; J&P Cycles; Rever
- Website: www.ridecomoto.com

Comoto Holdings is America's largest motorcycle parts and accessories aftermarket retailer, founded in 2016. The company merged RevZilla and Cycle Gear in 2016. The company acquired J&P Cycles and the motorcycle GPS app REVER four years later. The company's brands include BILT, Sedici, Street and Steel, Reax, and Hot-wired. The company's headquarters are in Philadelphia, Pennsylvania. RevZilla, Cycle Gear, Rever, and J&P Cycles are independent sister companies. In 2021, Comoto Holdings accelerated the fulfillment process with Exotec's Advanced Handling Systems. The robotic solutions and robotic goods-to-person systems will be used to fulfill orders. The president and chief executive officer as of December 2023 is Zach Parham.

== History ==
In 2016, Cycle Gear and RevZilla, two of America's largest motorcycle parts and accessories aftermarket retailers, merged under Comoto Holdings valued between 400-500 million dollars. Cycle Gear was a California-based company founded in 1974 by David Bertram, the CEO at its acquisition. During that period, the company owned 112 stores in 34 states, had a significant and growing online business, and distributed over 13 million catalogs annually.

RevZilla was an online retailer founded by Nick Auger, Anthony Bucci, and Matthew Kull in 2007. By 2014, the company had 450 employees, and its headquarters were at the Philadelphia Naval Shipyard, which also featured a flagship store. One year later in 2015, RevZilla was valued at 75 million dollars. In 2016, J.W. Childs Associates formed Comoto to merge the two companies. The company already owned Cycle Gear. Four years later in 2020, the company acquired the motorcycle GPS app REVER and J&P Cycles.

Rever was a Colorado-based technology company that connected powersports customers globally through the free Rever app and website. The platform was designed to allow users to discover the best places to ride and drive. It featured tracks and off-road trails, allowing users to share navigation experiences. The app was downloaded more than one million times during its acquisition.

J&P Cycles was founded by John Parham in 1979. The company operated retail stores in Ormond Beach, Florida, in the Daytona area, Sturgis, South Dakota, and Anamosa, Iowa, where the company was originally founded as a small motorcycle shop. The founder, John Parham, was inducted into the Sturgis Motorcycle Hall of Fame in 2006 and the AMA Motorcycle Hall of Fame in 2015. At the time of the acquisition, J&P Cycles had more than 300 employees and was led by John's son, President Zach Parham. Zach became the CEO of Comoto Holdings Inc. in December 2023.

== Leadership ==
Comoto Brands was briefly run by Anthony Bucci one of the founders of RevZilla. He resigned from the post in late 2016. Matt Kull one of the other founders of RevZilla took over the helm from 2017 until 2019. During his tenure, RevZilla launched Reax. The board then hired Ken Murphy to run RevZilla and Cycle Gear technically, Murphy became the president and CEO of Comoto Holdings. Murphy managed the company for over four years from August 2019 until December 2023. During his tenure, the company acquired Rever and J&P Cycles. Zach Parham became the current president and CEO directing all four companies.

== Helmets ==
In 2011, Cycle Gear founded two motorcycle helmet brands: BILT and Sedici. The company created designs and worked directly with manufacturers in countries like China and Pakistan to eliminate the middleman, allowing it to keep prices low. Initially, the brand offered a five-year warranty on BILT brands and a lifetime warranty on Sedici helmets. The name Sedici means 16 in Italian; it was considered a higher-end, European-inspired line guaranteed for life. By May 2017, one year after the merger with Comoto Holdings, the BILT brand's warranty changed from five years to one year, and the Sedici lifetime warranty was changed to two years.

On January 13, 2023, Comoto Holdings, Inc. issued a safety recall on specific models of the BILT helmets. The recall was for BILT Vertex helmets produced after September 1, 2021, and BILT Route helmets made after March 1, 2020. The National Highway Traffic Safety Administration issued a Safety Recall Report for roughly 18,980 helmets. The helmets did not provide impact protection in the event of a crash, which increased the rider's risk of head injury. The helmets suffered penetration test failures during independent testing, which did not comply with U.S. Department of Transportation standards. A recall was also issued for certain BILT Amped and Grommet helmets.
