= Edmund and Mary Ann Walworth Booth House =

Historic house in Iowa, United States

- U.S. National Register of Historic Places
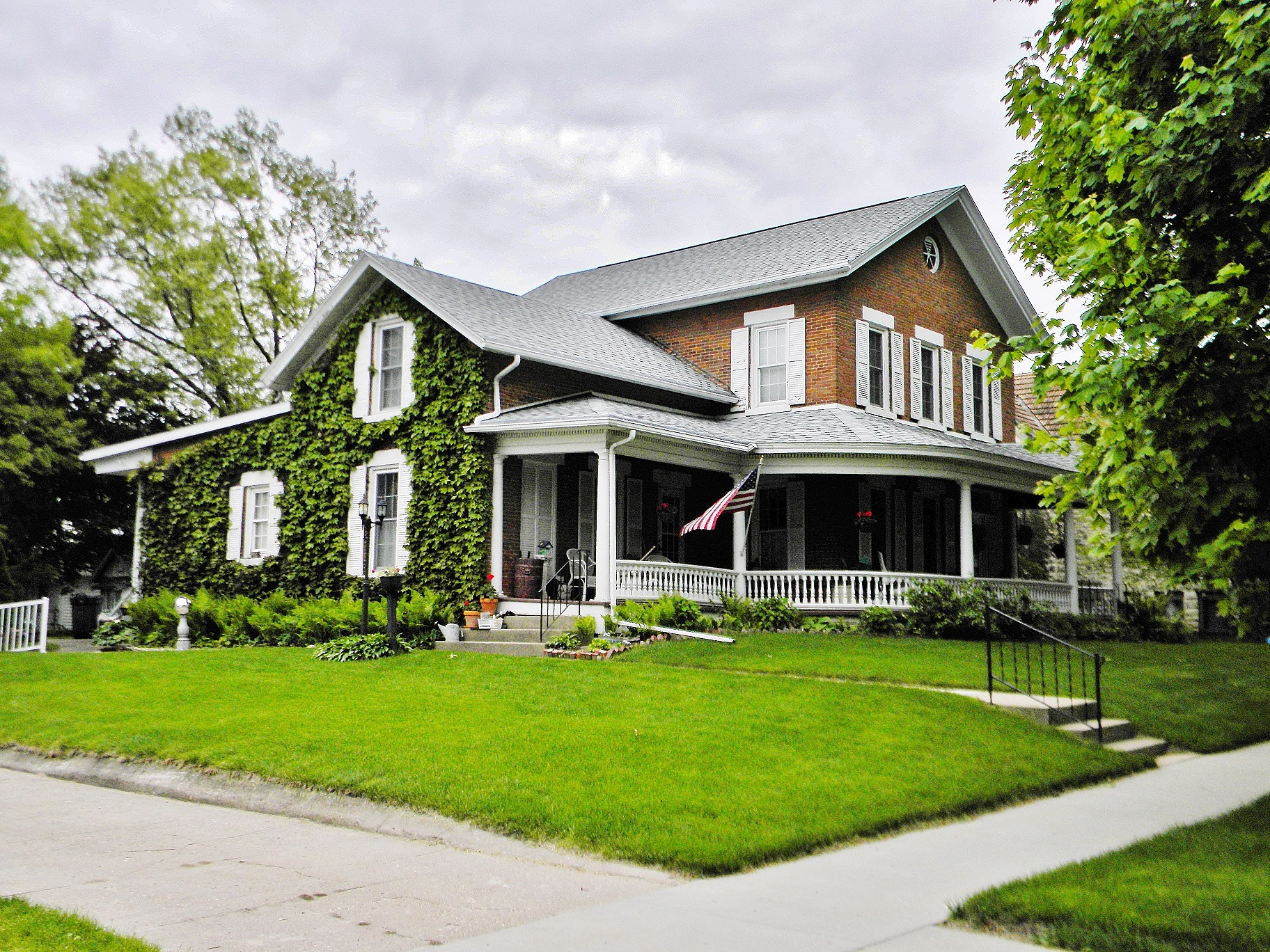

- Location within Iowa Location within the United States
- Location: 125 S. Ford St. Anamosa, Iowa
- Coordinates: 42°06′24.7″N 91°17′07.2″W
- Area: less than one acre
- Built: 1870
- Architectural style: Italianate
- NRHP reference No.: 13000067
- Added to NRHP: January 16, 2001

The Edmund and Mary Ann Walworth Booth House is a historic building located in Anamosa, Iowa, United States. Raised in Longmeadow, Massachusetts, Edmund Booth contracted meningitis at age four and lost part of his hearing. By the time he was eight he was totally deaf. His wife Mary Ann was born in Connecticut and she was also four when she contracted meningitis, but lost all of her hearing at that time. Booth became an early educator for the deaf, and his wife was one of his pupils. They both relocated separately to Iowa in 1839, and married the following year. After spending five years in the California gold fields while his family remained in Iowa, Booth returned to Iowa and resumed farming. He was instrumental in establishing the Iowa School for the Deaf in 1855, and the Iowa Association of the Deaf in 1881. He became the association's president in 1884. Booth had a thirty-year career as the publisher and editor of the Anamosa Eureka. The Booth's had this brick Italianate house built in 1870. They lived here until Mary Ann died in 1898 and Edmund in 1905. It was listed on the National Register of Historic Places in 2001.
