= Lawrence Schoonover =

American novelist

Lawrence Schoonover (1906–1980) was an American novelist.

Born in Anamosa, Iowa, Schoonover attended the University of Wisconsin, then worked in advertising before becoming a novelist.

Writing mostly historical fiction, his attention to detail and historical accuracy won him great praise by his contemporaries. Among his novels are Queen's Cross, The Burnished Blade, Gentle Infidel, The Spider King, and The Prisoner of Tordesillas.

== Bibliography ==
- The Burnished Blade (1948). The flaming martyrdom of Joan of Arc opens this historical romance in France at the dawn of the Renaissance. Among the onlookers at that terrible spectacle was Pierre, a frightened boy whom Hugh, the armorer, had rescued that morning on the road outside Rouen. Under Hugh's tutelage, Pierre learns the closely guarded secrets of the armorer's trade. But he is destined not to use them...
- Gentle Infidel (1950, 2009). Two lovely women, different as night and day, two conflicting faiths - one of the East, the other of the West - claimed the heart of young Michael da Montelupo. The son of Christian parents, handsome, stalwart Michael was impressed as a boy into the Turkish Emperor's elite Janissary corps, rigorously trained to become a brave, fanatical Moslem soldier. As a Turk, Michael fell under the sultry spell of Aeshia, a sensuous, scheming young Turkish wife, who tricked him into a relationship that nearly cost him his career - and his life. But Angelica, the slim, fair, Venetian girl, awakened in him echoes of his early Christian faith. It was for her that he put the East and its barbaric turbulence behind. Michael's romantic adventures are enacted against the background of an era of gaudy decadence, crafty intrigue, and exotic, colorful pageantry. The climax is reached in the spectacular siege and conquest of Constantinople in 1453, which marked Christendom's last stand against the infidel.
- The Golden Exile (1951). Adventures of English knight in Indochina.
- The Quick Brown Fox (1952) Business melodrama in an ad agency, in the vein of The Durable Fire by Howard Swiggett.
- The Spider King (1954). A dynamic biographical novel of Louis XI and his struggle to create a mighty nation from a weak medieval France.
- Queen's Cross (1955, 2008). A biographical romance novel of Isabella I of Castile and Ferdinand during the Reconquista.
- The Revolutionary (1958). A biographical novel of sea captain John Paul Jones during his period as a slaver and a fighter for the young U.S. and for the Russian imperial court.
- The Prisoner of Tordesillas (1959). Biographical novel of Mad Juana, daughter of Ferdinand and Isabella, and mother of Emperor Charles V.
- The Chancellor (1961). A novel of palace intrigue about Antoine Duprat, creator of the French lottery during the reign of Francis I of France.
- Central Passage (1962). Science fiction novel of the catastrophic climatic effects of an accidental war and the challenge of humanity's next evolutionary phase. This book is one of the first novels related to transhumanism.
- Key of Gold (1968). A Jewish doctor and family in Holland at the time of the Spanish inquisition.
- To Love a Queen: Walter Raleigh and Elizabeth (1973). Biographical novel of the famous adventurer in his capacity as courtier, entrepreneur, sea captain, and leader.

Three of his novels, "Gentle Infidel," "Queen's Cross," and "The Spider King" are currently in print in new editions, through Fountain City Publishing, a company owned by Mr. Schoonover's great-nephew George WB Scott. They are available in paperback through online book stores as part of "The Lawrence Schoonover Collection." Three more titles are scheduled for release in 2026.
