= Anamosa State Penitentiary Cemetery =

Historic site in Jones County, Iowa

- Iowa Men's Reformatory Cemetery
- U.S. National Register of Historic Places
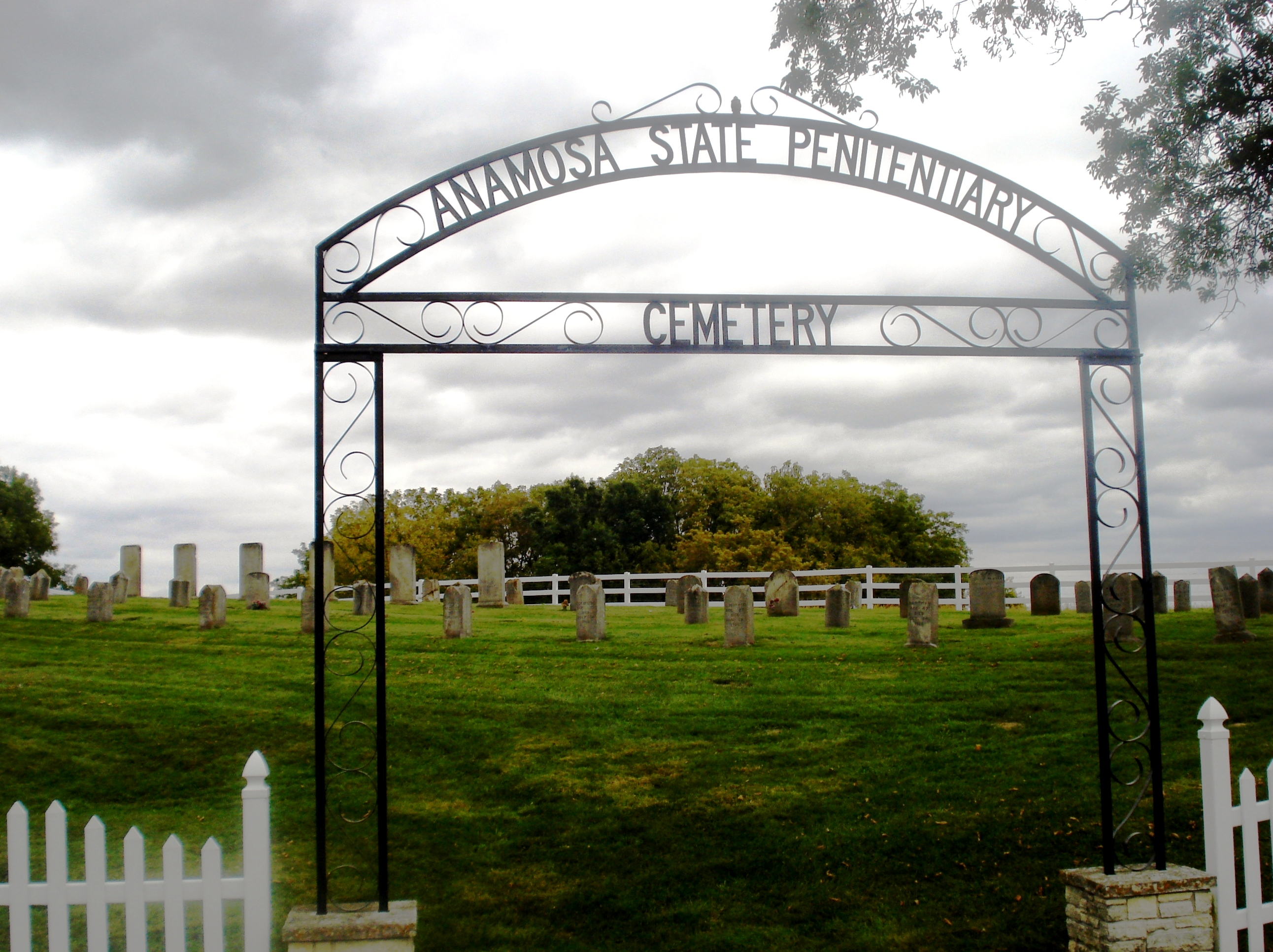

- Location within Iowa Location within the United States
- Location: County Trunk Highway E28 west of Buffalo Creek
- Nearest city: Anamosa, Iowa
- Coordinates: 42°06′44″N 91°18′32″W
- Area: less than one acre
- MPS: Municipal, County and State Corrections Properties MPS
- NRHP reference No.: 92001665
- Added to NRHP: December 18, 1992

The Anamosa State Penitentiary Cemetery, also known as the Iowa Men's Reformatory Cemetery or Boot Hill Cemetery, is located west of Anamosa, Iowa, United States. The first cemetery associated with the Iowa Men's Reformatory, now a penitentiary, was begun in 1876 at Prison Farm No. 1 or possibly at Farm No. 5. Its exact location is unknown. The graves are of those prisoners whose bodies were left unclaimed or were not taken to one of the state's medical colleges. They were buried in common graves that contained up to eight bodies. Tall limestone markers were placed at each grave and contained the prisoner's name and death date. They were moved here when this cemetery was established in 1914. Subsequent graves hold individual bodies, and are marked with shorter limestone markers with the prisoner's name, age, date of death, and sometimes their prison number. They are in three different styles. Two styles are upright stones, one with a triangular top and the other with a rounded top. They were used from 1914 to the 1940s. The third style of stone is a flat, horizontal marker that was used from the 1940s to the present.

The cemetery is a triangular piece of land located on Farm No. 1 with the graves arranged in rows at an angle. It is marked with an iron entrance gate with the words "Anamosa State Penitentiary Cemetery" across the top. It is surrounded by a white fence. The cemetery was listed as a historic site on the National Register of Historic Places in 1992.
