= Col. William T. and Elizabeth C. Shaw House =

Historic house in Iowa, United States

- U.S. National Register of Historic Places
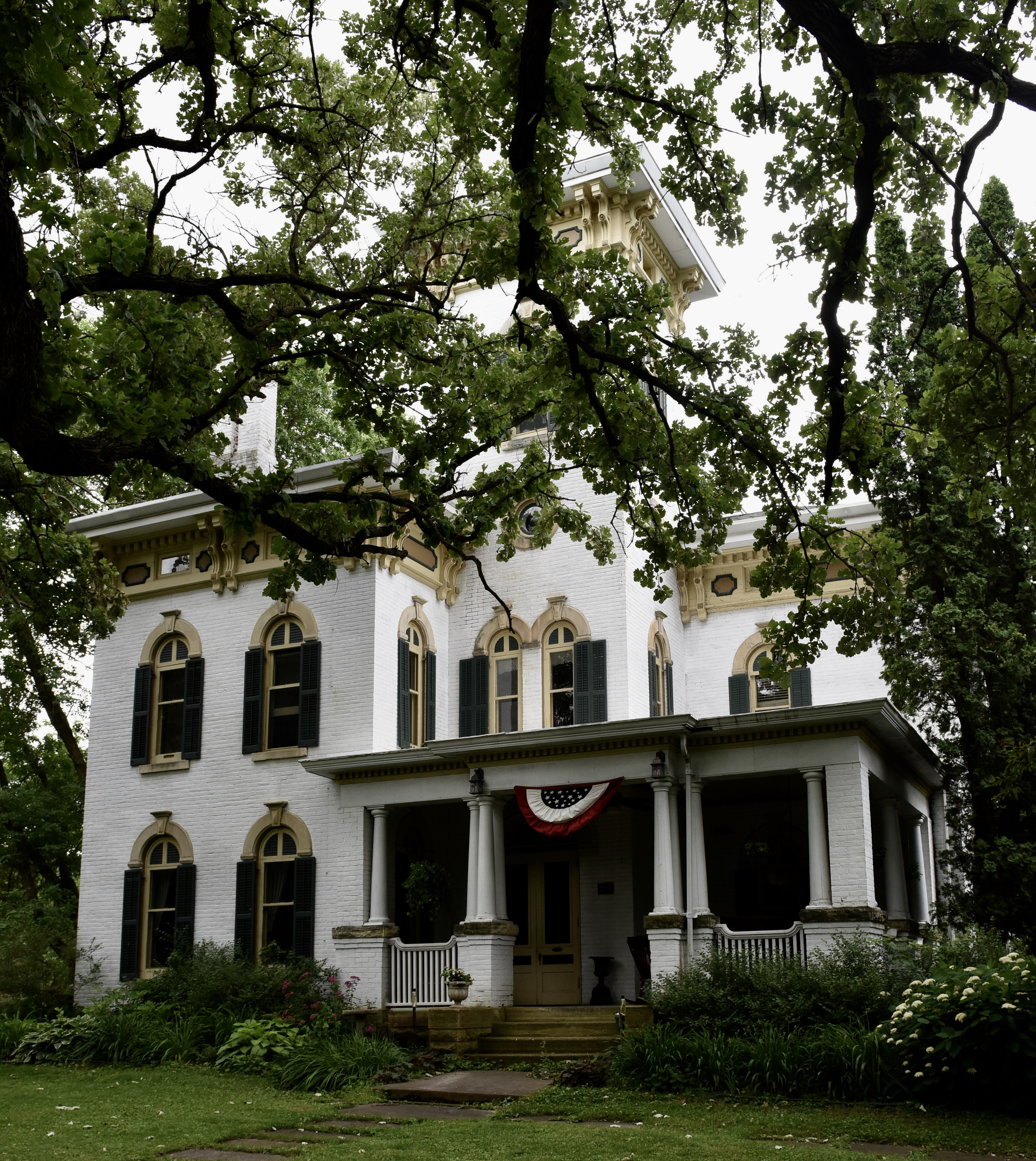

- Location within Iowa Location within the United States
- Location: 509 S. Oak St. Anamosa, Iowa
- Coordinates: 42°06′08.9″N 91°16′19.6″W
- Area: 4 acres (1.6 ha)
- Built: 1872
- Architectural style: 27, 1992
- NRHP reference No.: 92001636

The Col. William T. and Elizabeth C. Shaw House is a historic building located in Anamosa, Iowa, United States. Shaw settled in this area in 1854, and as a building contractor was responsible for the construction of many of the commercial blocks in the central business district. He was also involved in the platting of the town of Strawberry Hill, which was eventually incorporated into Anamosa, and he helped construct the Dubuque and Southwestern and the Midland Railroads in town. Shaw served as a colonel in the 14th Iowa Volunteer Infantry Regiment during the American Civil War. He had this two-story, brick Italian Villa built in 1872. It features a tall tower, bracketed eaves, a low-pitched hip roof, elaborate window hoods, and tall, narrow windows. The house was listed on the National Register of Historic Places in 1992.
