= Lillian Ruth Matthews =

American social worker (1878–1938)

- Matthews, from a 1908 newspaper
- Born: October 1878; Anamosa, Iowa, U.S.
- Died: October 14, 1938 (age 60); Orange, California, U.S.
- Other name: Lillian Crook (after 1916)
- Occupations: Economist, social worker, state official, college professor

Lillian Ruth Matthews Crook (October 1878 – October 14, 1938) was an American economist, social worker, probation officer, and state official in California. From 1913 to 1916 she was Chief Children's Agent with the California Board of Control, tasked with overseeing the funds set aside by the Mothers' Pensions Act for the support of dependent children.

== Early life and education ==
Matthews was born in Anamosa, Iowa, the daughter of John Spencer Matthews and Maria Antoinette Jenkins Matthews. Her father was a miller born in Canada. She graduated from the University of Iowa in 1903, pursued graduate studies at Columbia University's School of Philanthropy, and was granted a Ph.D. from the University of California's College of Commerce in 1912.

== Career ==
Matthews was a probation officer and social worker in Des Moines and a welfare investigator in New York City. "Poverty is a soul cramping condition," she told an audience of Iowa clubwomen in 1908, explaining her beliefs about the origins of juvenile delinquency. She also spoke about juvenile delinquency to the Iowa state conference of charities and corrections in 1909. She spoke about settlement work at the Ebell Club in Oakland in 1912.

Matthews taught social economics in the College of Commerce at the University of California. In 1913 she was appointed Chief Children's Agent, an administrative position under California's Board of Control, established by the Mothers' Pensions Act. She was responsible for overseeing the state's support for dependent children, including the mothers' pension fund and orphanages. She was described at the time as "the second-highest paid woman in the government employ in California". In 1914, she reported that, because of her office's work, "several thousand children are being kept above the line of pauperism, below which they would have dropped" and "the state institutions are cooperating with us to a fine extent." In 1915, she announced that the state's policy would shift from funding institutional placements to assisting family carers where possible. She resigned as state children's agent in 1916.

After her 1916 marriage, she taught at the University of Arizona.

== Publications ==
- Women in Trade Unions in San Francisco (1913)

== Personal life ==
Matthews became the second wife of rancher Oliver J. Crook in July 1916, and lived in Tucson, Arizona. They had two sons. Later in life she lived in Long Beach, California. She died in 1938, in Orange, California, at age 60.
