= Moore's Ford Bridge =

United States historic place in Iowa

- U.S. National Register of Historic Places
- Location within Iowa Location within the United States
- Location: 25th Ave. over White Water Creek
- Nearest city: Monticello, Iowa
- Coordinates: 42°16′47″N 90°55′40″W
- Built: 1884
- Built by: Morse Bridge Company
- Architectural style: Pratt through truss
- MPS: Highway Bridges of Iowa MPS
- NRHP reference No.: 98000538
- Added to NRHP: May 15, 1998

Moore's Ford Bridge was a historic structure located northeast of Monticello, Iowa, United States. It spanned White Water Creek for 100 feet (30 m). The Jones County Board of Supervisors received a petition for a bridge at this location in September 1877. While they agreed there was a need, they put off erecting a bridge here until other bridges in the county were completed at major crossings. They finally authorized this bridge in September 1883 and contracted with the Morse Bridge Company of Youngstown, Ohio to erect a single Pratt through truss span here. It was completed in June 1884 for $2,305. The bridge was listed on the National Register of Historic Places in 1998. It has subsequently been taken down.

== See also ==
- List of bridges on the National Register of Historic Places in Iowa
- National Register of Historic Places listings in Jones County, Iowa
