= Rick's Brewery =

- U.S. National Register of Historic Places
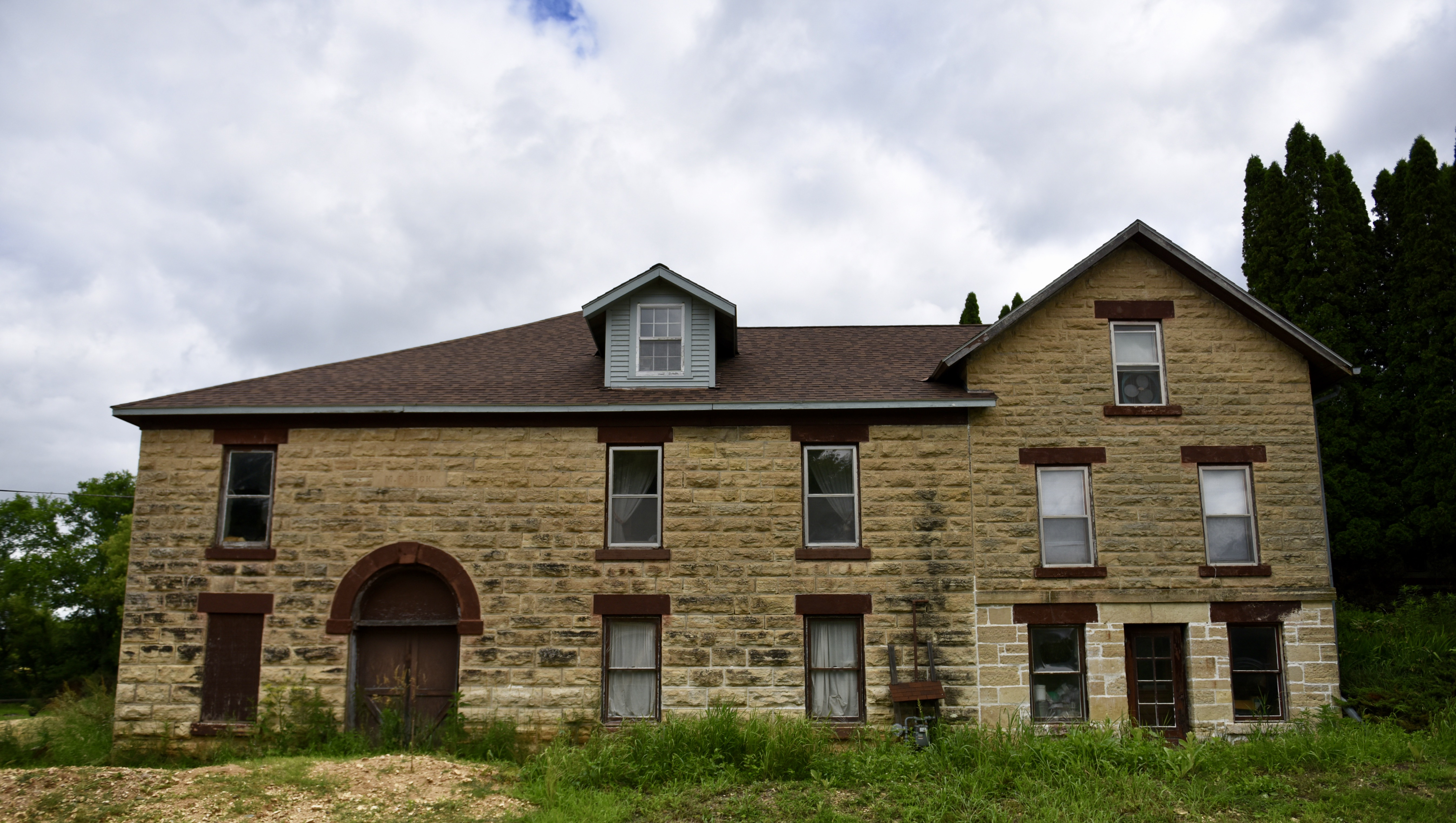

- Location within Iowa Location within the United States
- Location: 12412 Buffalo Rd.
- Nearest city: Anamosa, Iowa
- Coordinates: 42°06′48″N 91°18′0″W
- Area: 3.5 acres (1.4 ha)
- Built: 1859-1872
- NRHP reference No.: 99000312
- Added to NRHP: March 12, 1999

Rick's Brewery, also known as Minnie Creek Brewery and Old Brewery, is a historic building located west of Anamosa, Iowa, United States. John Kohl bought the property in 1858, and he joined with John B. Kraus and Wilhelm Romberg to build the initial part of the building the following year. The three-story structure was built of native limestone that was quarried 2 miles (3.2 km) to the west. It was built into the side of a hill so each level has a ground level entrance. They operated Minnie Creek Brewery here until 1863 when the building was sold at a sheriff's sale to satisfy a judgment against the partners. Abram B. Head bought it and sold the building the next year to Michael F. Rick who operated the brewery for 13 years and expanded the building to its present size. Rick also lost the building in a sheriff's sale in 1878 to satisfy a judgement against him. From 1882 to 1894 Iowa went through is first period of prohibition and it is not certain whether the building has housed a brewery since. It has subsequently been transformed into a residence. The building was listed on the National Register of Historic Places in 1999.
