= Hale Bridge =

- U.S. National Register of Historic Places
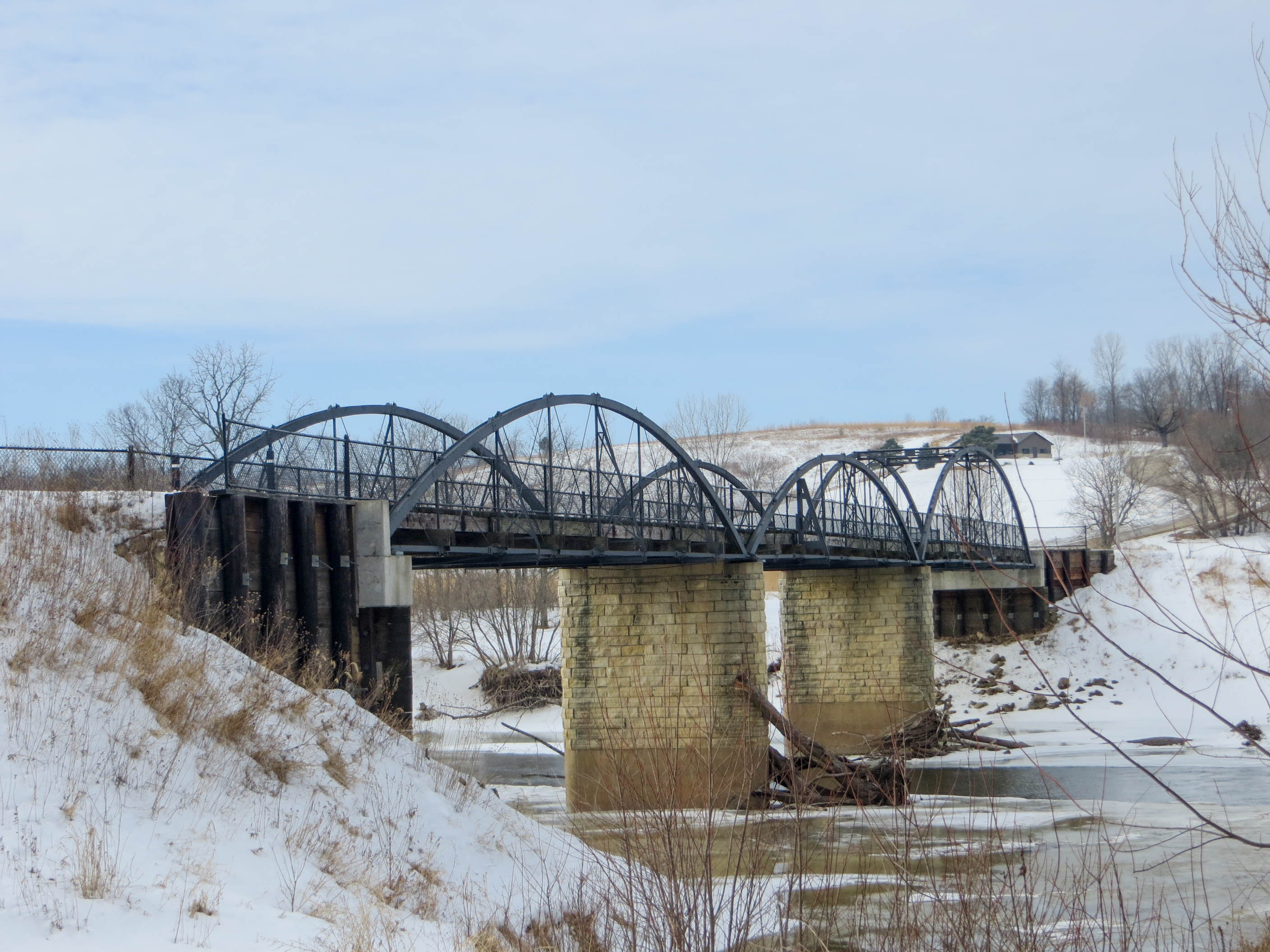
- Hale Bridge in 2014

- Location within Iowa Location within the United States
- Nearest city: Anamosa, Iowa
- Coordinates: 42°05′33.8″N 91°16′28.8″W
- Built: 1877-1879
- Built by: King Iron Bridge and Manufacturing Co.
- Architectural style: Bowstring through arch-truss
- MPS: Highway Bridges of Iowa MPS
- NRHP reference No.: 98000539
- Added to NRHP: May 15, 1998

Hale Bridge is a historic structure located south of Anamosa, Iowa, United States. It spans the Wapsipinicon River for 296 feet (90 m). It is an example of a bowstring through-arch truss bridge. Perhaps thousands of these bridges were built in Iowa in the late 1860s through the 1870s. However, by 1992, fewer than twenty survive.

In April 1877 the Jones County Board of Supervisors contracted with the King Iron Bridge and Manufacturing Co. of Cleveland to provide iron bridges to the county for the next year. Pile driving for this bridge's substructure got underway soon after, and the piers were completed by early fall. King provided a 100-foot (30 m) bowstring through arch-truss and a shorter pony arch in the winter of 1878. The bridge's configuration was changed the following spring and the county ordered another pony truss to replace the original timber approach. The bridge was completed in June 1879, and listed on the National Register of Historic Places in 1998. The Hale Bridge remained in its original location near the unincorporated community of Hale until 2006 when it was moved upriver to Wapsipinicon State Park south of Anamosa.

== See also ==
- List of bridges documented by the Historic American Engineering Record in Iowa
- List of bridges on the National Register of Historic Places in Iowa
- National Register of Historic Places listings in Jones County, Iowa
