= Wapsipinicon State Park =

Park near Anamosa, Iowa

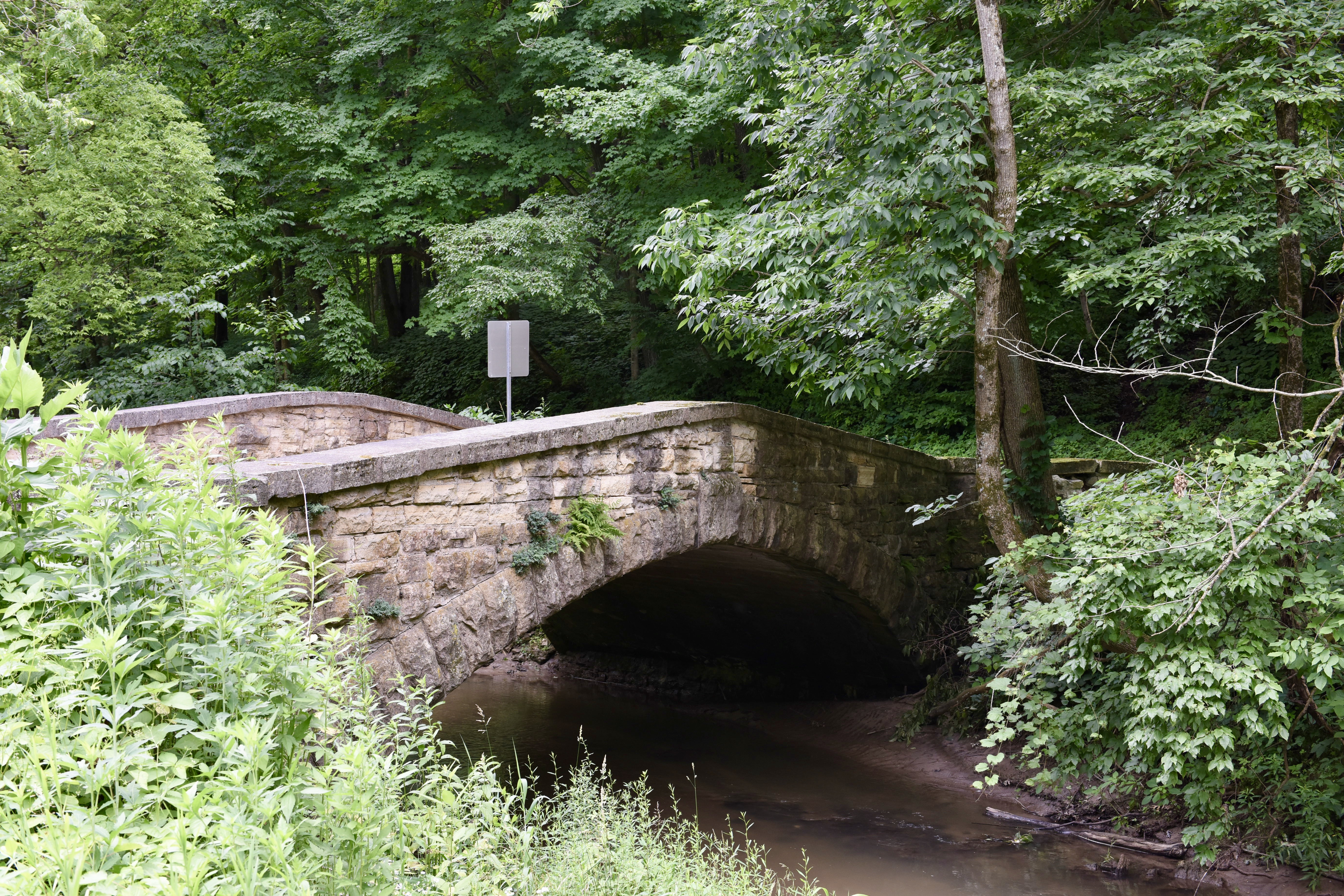

- Location within Iowa Location within the United States
- Location: Jones County, Iowa, United States
- Coordinates: 42°05′43″N 91°17′08″W
- Area: 390 acres (160 ha)
- Elevation: 876 ft (267 m)
- Established: 1923
- Administrator: Iowa Department of Natural Resources
- Website: Official website
- Wapsipinicon State Park Historic District
- U.S. National Register of Historic Places
- U.S. Historic district
- Architectural style: Rustic
- NRHP reference No.: 14000669
- Added to NRHP: September 22, 2014

Wapsipinicon State Park is located south of Anamosa, Iowa, United States. The 394-acre (159 ha) park is along the sandstone and limestone bluffs of the Wapsipinicon River, from which it derives its name. It is one of the oldest state parks in Iowa. It was listed as a historic district on the National Register of Historic Places in 2014.

== Description ==
The initial 180 acres (73 ha) for the park was donated by a local citizens group that raised around $23,000 in 1921 to buy the land in order to preserve it and to keep the timber from being logged. The park was dedicated in 1923, making Wapsipinicon one of the first state parks established in Iowa. The park has several archaeological sites where evidence of Pre-Columbian era societies lived. Two historic bridges that cross the river are also part of the park's historic nature. The Hale Bridge, which was moved here in 2006, is a rare surviving example of a bowstring through-truss.

The facilities in the park were developed in the 1920s and the 1930s utilizing the Rustic style of architecture. Unlike many state parks in Iowa from this era that had their facilities built by the Civilian Conservation Corps, a public work relief program during the Great Depression, Wapsipinicon's facilities were constructed by prisoners from nearby Anamosa State Penitentiary. They built the shelters, stone arch bridges and the roads. The limestone for the structures was quarried locally, and it took about five years to complete the construction. In the years following the inmates continued to maintain the park.

The park's recreational activities include camping, fishing and boating. Trails are provided for hiking, cross country skiing and snowmobiling. There are also a couple of caves to explore, including an ice cave. The park is a terminus for the Northeast State Park Bike Route, which connects it to Pikes Peak State Park and Backbone State Park by way of county highways. Hunting is allowed in season in an adjacent 140 acres (57 ha) that was acquired in 1990. A nine-hole golf course in the park is maintained by the Wapsipinicon Country Club.
