= J&P Cycles =

Company

J&P Cycles, Inc.
- Type: Private
- Industry: Motorcycle components Motorcycle accessories Harley-Davidson Parts; Retail
- Founded: Anamosa, Iowa, United States (1979)
- Founder: John Parham, Jill Parham
- Headquarters: Coppell, Texas
- Number of locations: 6 stores (as of June 2022)
- Area served: Worldwide
- Key people: John Parham (Founder); Jill Parham (Founder); Zach Parham (President)
- Products: motorcycle parts and accessories
- Parent: Comoto Holdings
- Website: jpcycles.com

J&P Cycles, Inc. was founded by John and Jill Parham in 1979. It sells motorcycle components, apparel, and gear for the American V-twin motorcycle rider. Owned by Comoto Holdings, the company operates online and has retail outlets in Ormond Beach, Florida, Sturgis, South Dakota, Pigeon Forge, Tennessee, and Taylor, Michigan.

== History ==
In 1975, John Parham began selling motorcycle parts and accessories via a small partnership in a motorcycle shop. In 1979, John and his wife Jill Parham founded "J. Parham Enterprises, Inc." The small motorcycle shop burned to the ground in 1984; this prompted the couple to develop a warehouse that is now the J&P Cycles headquarters, expanded in 2007. Parham also helped to create the National Motorcycle Museum in Anamosa, Iowa. He was the museum president and J&P Cycles is a donor. Comoto Holdings acquired J&P Cycles in January 2020.

== Products ==
The company sells motorcycle parts and accessories such as tires, exhaust, engine components, and seats, as well as riding gear such as helmets and clothing via their website and in a retail environment.

== Awards ==
In October 2015, John Parham was inducted into the AMA Motorcycle Hall of Fame. In February 2012, Parham received the "Don J. Brown Lifetime Achievement Award", at the "Dealernews Top 100 Dealer Awards" in Indianapolis, Indiana. Parham was recognized for his dedication to the motorcycle industry and through helping to set up the National Motorcycle Museum in Anamosa, Iowa. The award is presented to an individual recognized in the retailing community for furthering the sport, the business, and the industry in general, over the course of his or her career. It is named in honor of Don J. Brown, a founding editor of Dealernews with a career that spanned over 50 years. Parham died in 2017.

== National Motorcycle Museum ==
The National Motorcycle Museum, a non-profit entity, is located at 102 Chamber Drive, Anamosa, Iowa. The museum was founded in 1989 by motorcycle builders, racers, and riders. It aims to preserve the experience of biking in the past and demonstrate the present biking sport and lifestyle. The museum archives documents and displays vintage bikes (the earliest from 1903). It was named "Iowa Tourism Attraction" of the Year in 2001.

== J&P Express and speed records at the Bonneville Salt Flats ==
J&P Express is the speed sports arm of J&P Cycles based at the National Motorcycle Museum in Iowa. In 2006 J&P Cycles established S/PG-1350 records of Kilo 180.4965, and Mle 178.9485 with their modified 79 cubic inch Harley Sportster engine. Occasionally the museum will loan the streamliner motorcycle, which made land speed records at Bonneville, to other motorcycle historical sites and museums.

== Rankings, ratings, and awards ==
- J&P Cycles holds the land speed record in the S/PG-1350 CC class (as recognized by the American Motorcyclist Association)
- "Don J. Brown lifetime achievement award"
- Ranked #324 for online sales among all Internet retailers by Internet Retailer (February 2010) with $30 million and 11.1 percent growth in 2010
- RightNow Technologies "Social Superstar Award" (2010)
- SilverPop "Social pop star award for best use of social media in email" (2011)
- Gartner, "1 to 1 Media silver awarded winner for social engagement" (2011)
- "Stella Service excellent award"

== Charity work ==
J&P Cycles is a donor for the National Motorcycle Museum. In 2011, J&P Cycles sponsored two riders, Joe Kopp and Michael Beckin, in the "Vance and Hines XR1200 class" of the AMA Pro Racing Championship series. J&P Cycles has also sponsored Camp Courageous (Iowa) and fundraised for AmVets in Anamosa.

== Media and popular culture ==
=== Television ===
J&P Cycles was featured January 6, 2012 in two one-hour episodes of ABC's Extreme Makeover: Home Edition, J&P helped restore two vintage Kawasaki motorcycles for a disadvantaged Iowa family. J&P Cycles appeared on "Two Wheel Tuesday" on the Speed Channel on a regular basis. J&P participated in a segment called "Corbin’s Ride On." J&P also appeared in 10 episodes of the Speed Channel's American Thunder in 2006.

=== Harley-Davidson Culture ===
J&P Cycles is referenced in several books on Harley-Davidson motorcycles, custom motorcycle building, and choppers:

- The Complete Idiot's Guide to Motorcycles
- Eddie Paul's Extreme Chopper Building
- Biker's Handbook: Becoming Part of the Motorcycle Culture
- Choppers Field Guide
- Fundamentals of Marketing

== Publications ==

Ed Youngblood, an author of several books on the motorcycle industry and a member of the Motorcycle Hall of Fame, wrote Keeping the World on 2 Wheels. How J&P Cycles Changed the American Motorcycle Industry in 2008.
