= Scott Newhard =

American politician

Scott D. Newhard (born August 23, 1951) is an American politician.

Newhard was born in Anamosa, Iowa and graduated from Anamosa Community High School in 1969. He served in the Iowa National Guard and went to Iowa Wesleyan University. Newhard served in the Iowa House of Representatives from 1973 to 1979 and was a Democrat.
