= Dr. Martin H. Caulkins House and Office =

Historic house in Iowa, United States

- U.S. National Register of Historic Places
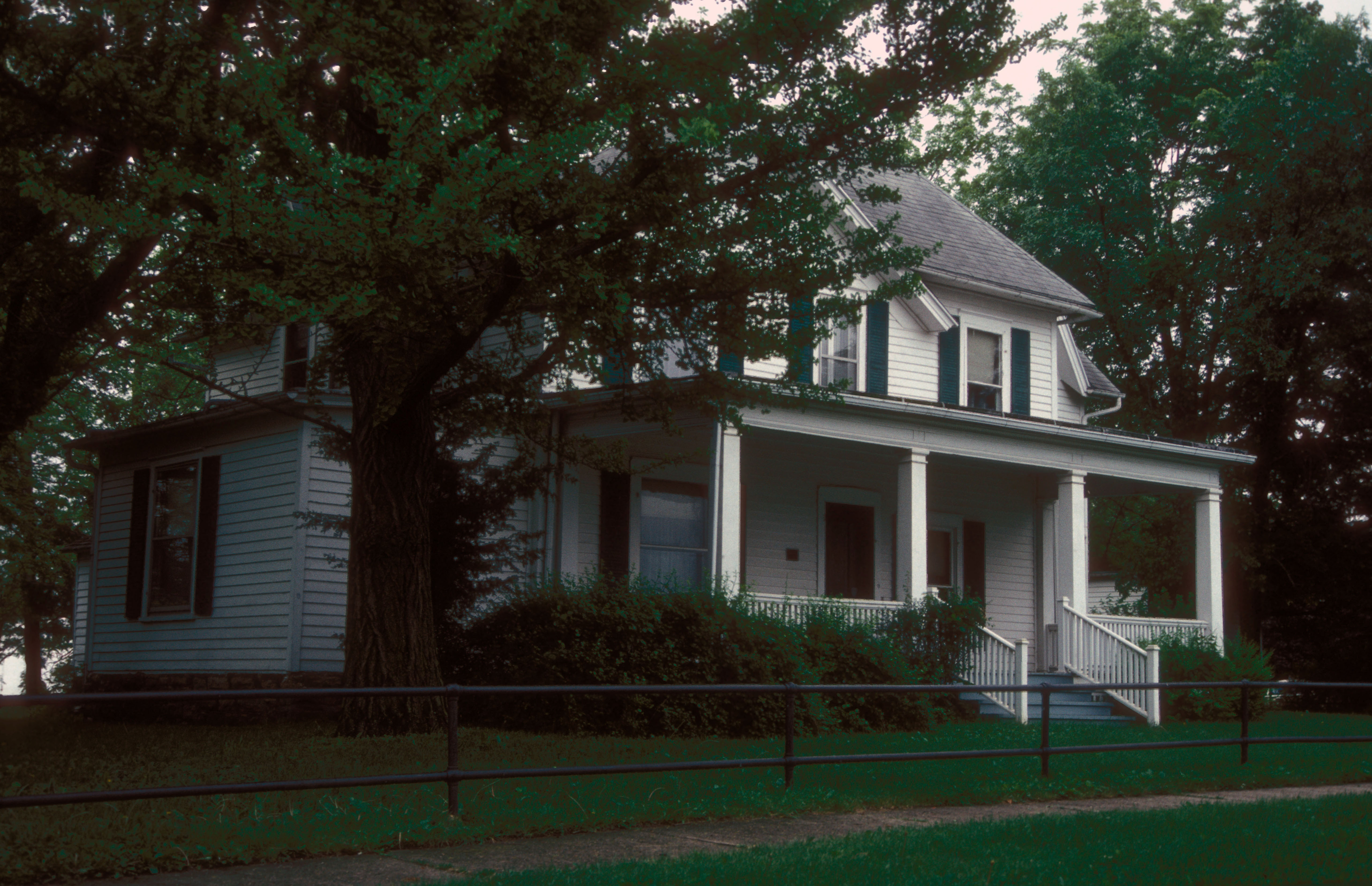

- Location within Iowa Location within the United States
- Location: Washington and Main Sts., Wyoming, Iowa
- Coordinates: 42°03′31.2″N 91°0′18.9″W
- Area: 3 acres (1.2 ha)
- Built: 1860, 1895
- NRHP reference No.: 82002625
- Added to NRHP: April 27, 1979

The Dr. Martin H. Caulkins House and Office is a historic building located in Wyoming, Iowa, United States. Caulkins was a New York native who started out as a teacher before studying medicine. He married his wife Lucinda Louden in 1855, and moved to Iowa the following year. Caulkins was the first physician to serve this rural community. He also served as the town's first mayor, and in the Iowa Legislature.

The two-story, frame house was built in two parts. The success of his practice allowed him to build this house starting in 1860, and he continued to add to it as the need and finances allowed. Caulkins maintained his office in his house. It is a two-story frame structure that adheres to no particular style. The house was listed on the National Register of Historic Places in 1979.
