= Odd Fellows Hall (Monticello, Iowa) =

- U.S. National Register of Historic Places
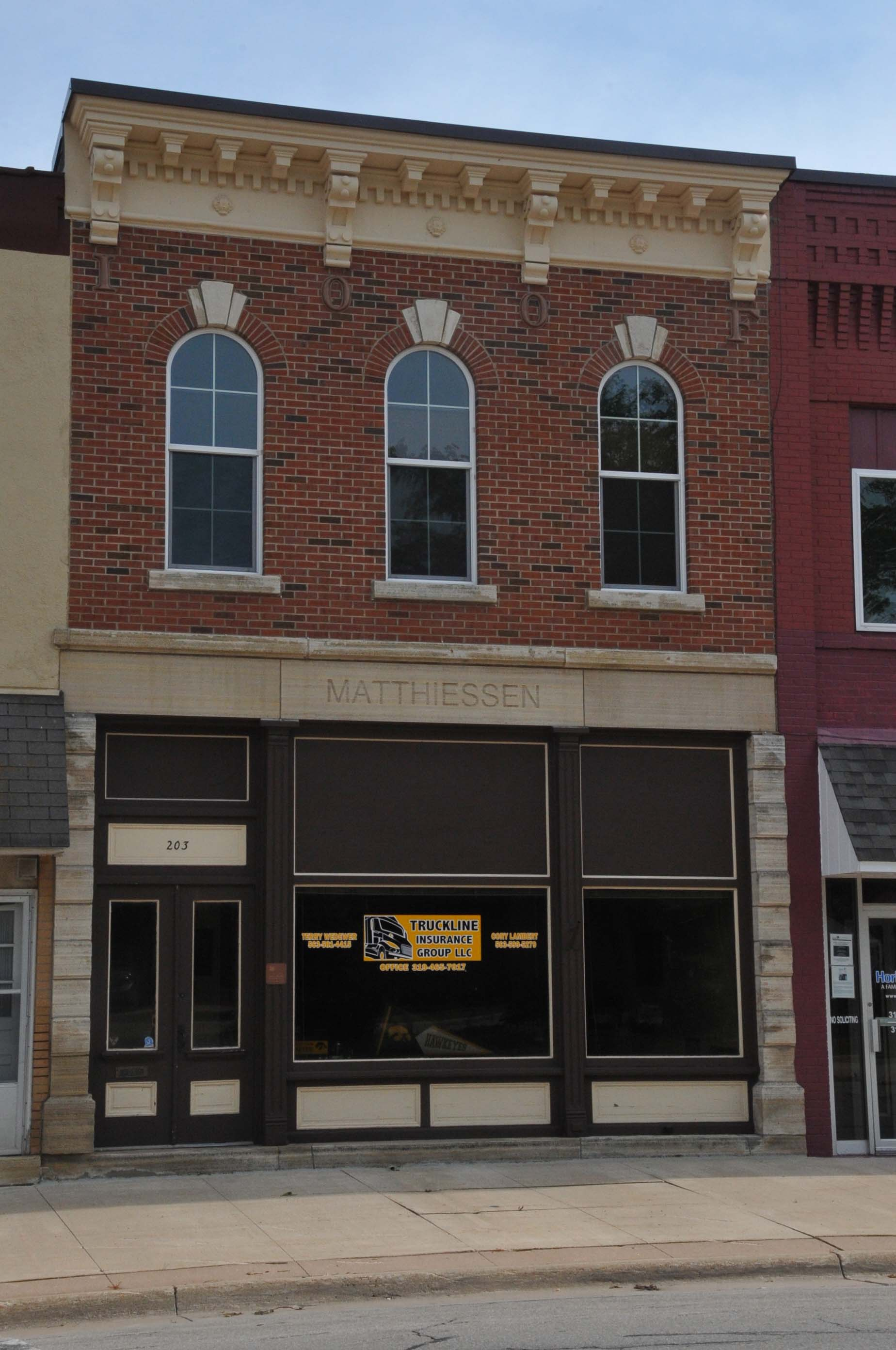

- Location within Iowa Location within the United States
- Location: 203 W. 1st St. Monticello, Iowa
- Coordinates: 42°14′16″N 91°11′27″W
- Area: less than one acre
- Built: 1871
- Architect: Carpenter & Cavell
- Architectural style: Italianate
- NRHP reference No.: 85001377
- Added to NRHP: June 27, 1985

The Odd Fellows Hall in Monticello, Iowa was built in 1871. It is a narrow, 20 feet (6.1 m) by 65 feet (20 m) Italianate commercial building.

It was built for the Monticello Lodge No. 117 of the International Order of Odd Fellows (IOOF), that had been organized on March 16, 1858. The Odd Fellows group grew to a peak membership of 121 members, and at one point had an associated German-language lodge, William Tell #391 with 25 members, but the organization declined and was defunct by the 1920s.

It was listed in the National Register of Historic Places in 1985. According to the 1985 nomination, it was the best-preserved Italianate, late 19th century, commercial building in Monticello.
