= Business Part of Olin Historic District =

Historic district in Iowa, United States

- U.S. National Register of Historic Places
- U.S. Historic district
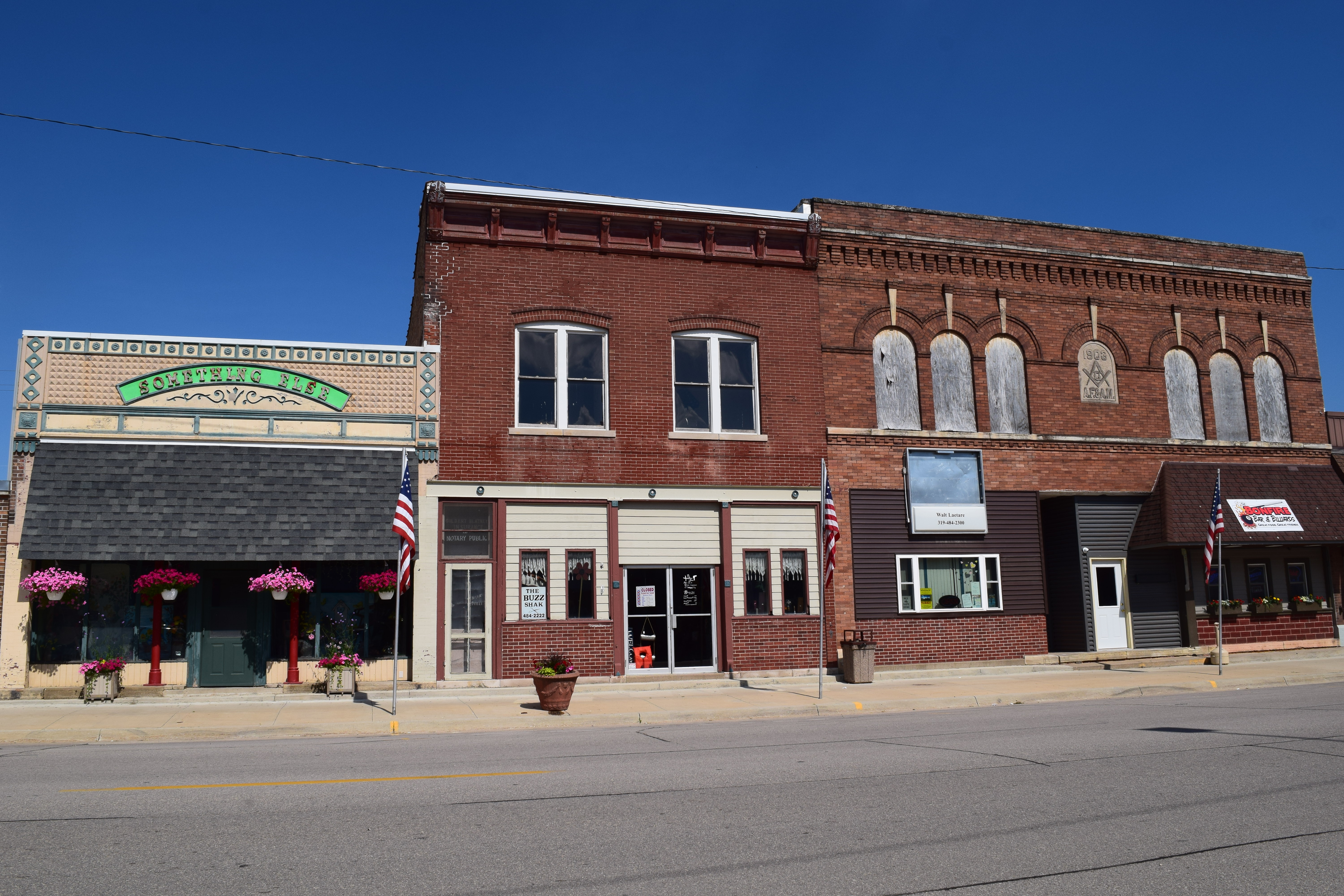

- Location within Iowa Location within the United States
- Location: Both sides of 300 blk. of E. Jackson and portion of E. 2nd Sts., Olin, Iowa
- Coordinates: 41°59′51.8″N 91°08′30.5″W
- Area: 3 acres (1.2 ha)
- Architectural style: Late Victorian; Late 19th & 20th Century Revivals
- NRHP reference No.: 08001381
- Added to NRHP: November 12, 2014

The Business Part of Olin Historic District is a nationally recognized historic district located in Olin, Iowa, United States. It was listed on the National Register of Historic Places in 2014. At the time of its nomination the district consisted of 22 resources, including 18 contributing buildings and four non-contributing buildings. The district takes in the city's central business district.

Olin was surveyed and platted from 1840 to 1842 and called the City of Rome by Norman B. Seeley. It was oriented along Walnut Creek to the south, but the city grew to the north where the St. Paul & Davenport Railroad, later the Chicago, Milwaukee, and St. Paul Railroad, built their depot by 1875. The business district developed along Jackson Street in the original town plat. The town was incorporated as Olin in 1878. It was named for D.A. Olin, the General Superintendent of the Chicago, Milwaukee & St. Paul Railroad. The town thrived in Iowa's Golden Age of Agriculture around the turn of the 20th-century, but it has been static ever since.

Three major fires affected the commercial district. In 1876 and 1881 fires destroyed buildings on the east side of Jackson Street, and in 1892 a fire destroyed the buildings on the west side of the street. The way the two sides of the street were rebuilt are different. The east side of the street was developed in a laissez-faire fashion where individuals constructed buildings according to their needs and desires. This is how much of Victorian commercial development occurred in Iowa. A large part of the west side of Jackson Street was developed after the 1892 fire. Those whose businesses were affected by the fire banded together and redeveloped the affected properties with a unified commercial block. These are the oldest buildings in the district.
