= Farm No. 1, Iowa Men's Reformatory =

Historic place in Iowa, United States

- U.S. National Register of Historic Places
- U.S. Historic district
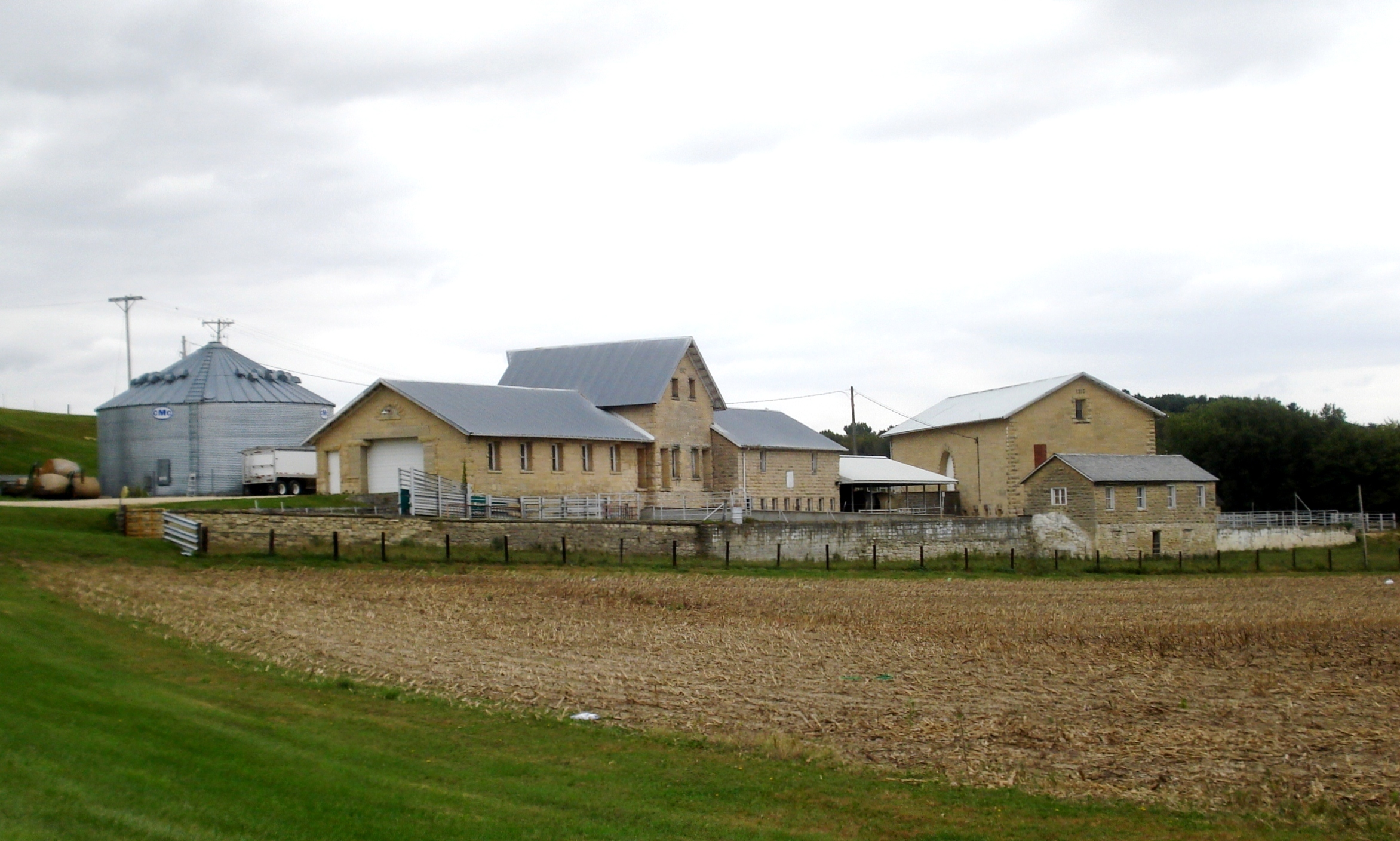

- Location within Iowa Location within the United States
- Location: County Trunk Highway E28 west of Buffalo Creek
- Nearest city: Anamosa, Iowa
- Coordinates: 42°06′33″N 91°18′08″W
- Area: 37 acres (15 ha)
- Built: 1912-1939
- Architectural style: Romanesque Revival
- MPS: Municipal, County and State Corrections Properties MPS
- NRHP reference No.: 92001664
- Added to NRHP: December 18, 1992

Farm No. 1, Iowa Men's Reformatory, also known as the West Farm, is located west of Anamosa, Iowa, United States. It was listed as a historic district on the National Register of Historic Places in 1992. At the time of its nomination the district consisted of 10 resources, including seven contributing buildings, and three non-contributing buildings. When the property for the reformatory was acquired by the State of Iowa in 1872 it included 61 acres (25 ha) of farmland. Farming at the facility did not become a significant enterprise here until the turn of the 20th century. Before then the prisoners maintained a vegetable garden within the walls, and they raised sixty-five hogs. The state bought 80.31 acres (32.50 ha) of land in 1904 for farming operations and built a hog house and a stone barn, both are no longer extant. Minimum security prisoners did the farm work. The historic buildings were built between 1912 and 1939. They are all stone structures built in a simplified Romanesque Revival style. The influence of the style is found in the "heavy massing, texture of the stone, and the window, door, and corner treatments." The buildings were built for the following uses: South barn (1912, 1926 addition), barn granary (1915), root cellar (1919), North barn (c. 1919), slaughter house (1921-1922), processing plant (1922), and the seed house, dining hall, cold frame (1939).

By 1917, prisoners were farming 380 acres (150 ha) of state lands and 1,675 acres (678 ha) of leased lands. The products produced by the farms increased to include vegetables, animal feed, poultry, eggs, fruit, milk, and milk products for the prison. By 1930, the state had bought most of the land it farmed and operated six prison farms. A barn was converted into a cheese factory in 1931. The full operation continued into the 1970s when the slaughtering operation was discontinued, and the livestock herds were reduced. It also became more economical to buy vegetables rather than grow their own. Agricultural production began to increase again in the 1990s.
