= Anamosa Main Street Historic District =

Historic district in Iowa, United States

- U.S. National Register of Historic Places
- U.S. Historic district
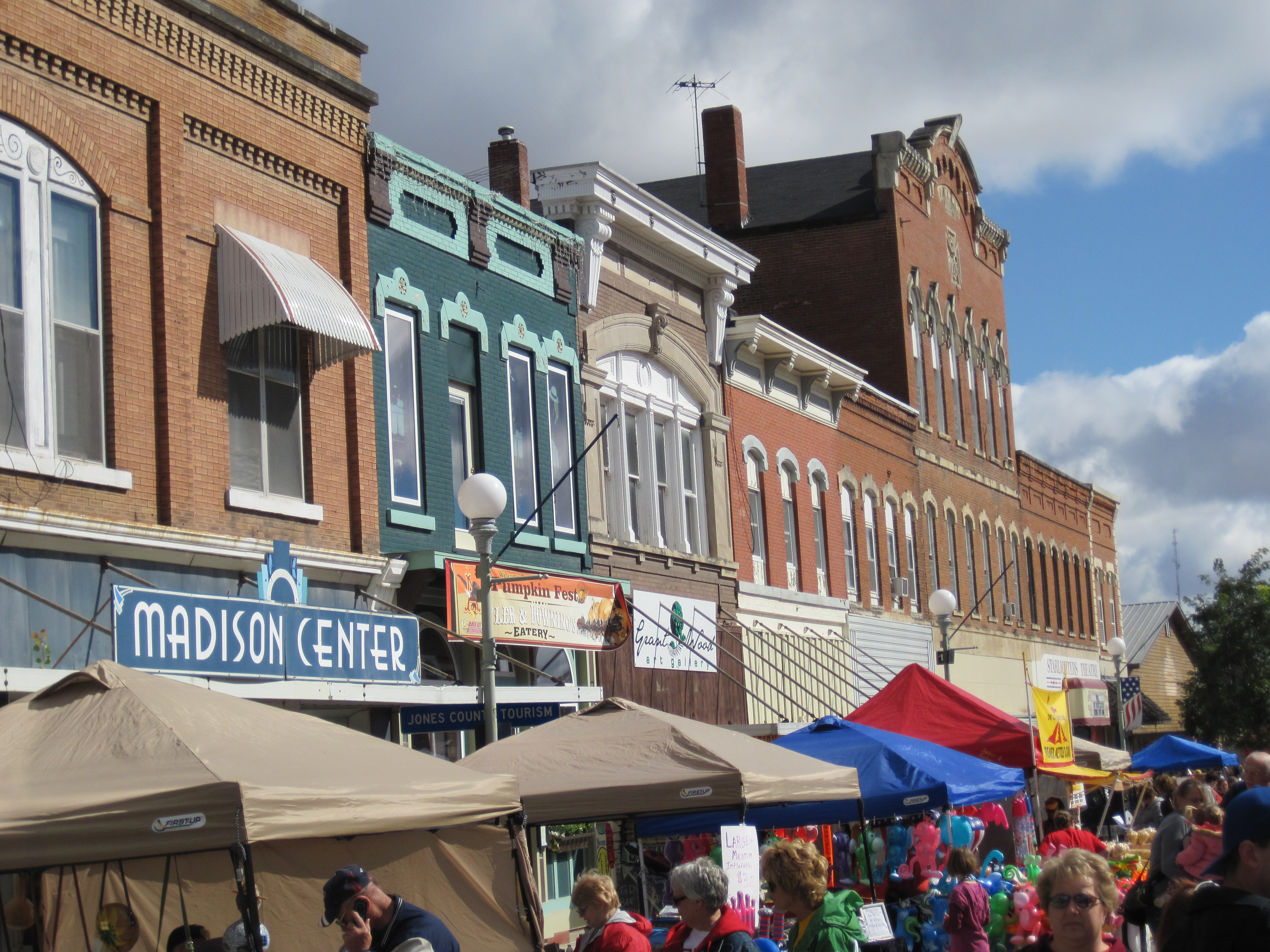

- Location within Iowa Location within the United States
- Location: 200 and 300 blocks of W. Main St., 100 block of E. Main St., 100 blocks of N. and S. Ford St., and 100 block of N. Garnavillo St., Anamosa, Iowa
- Coordinates: 42°06′29.7″N 91°17′07.6″W
- Area: 9 acres (3.6 ha)
- NRHP reference No.: 08001381
- Added to NRHP: January 29, 2009

The Anamosa Main Street Historic District is a nationally recognized historic district located in Anamosa, Iowa, United States. It was listed on the National Register of Historic Places in 2009. At the time of its nomination the district consisted of 52 resources, including 42 contributing buildings, one contributing structure, and nine non-contributing buildings. The district takes in most of the city's central business district. For the most part, the buildings here were used for commercial purposes, but some of them housed light industrial operations, the post office, and the Masonic lodge. The buildings generally range from one to two stories, but a couple structures are three stories in height. Built between the 1860s and the early decades of the 20th century, the buildings are composed of masonry construction. Several were built using the areas limestone. The Italianate style is dominate, but other late 19th and 20th century revivals, and late 19th and early 20th century American movements are also found here.

Other than its architecture, what makes Anamosa standout is that unlike most other Iowa city's it was never properly platted. Instead, the city grew organically from three commercial nodes. One was located in the flood plain of the Wapsipinicon River, and two others on the higher ground to the east. The two on the higher ground developed together and are the basis for this district's development. The city saw rapid development with the advent of the railroad through town and the demand for the limestone quarried from the area. The development of the Anamosa State Penitentiary beginning in the 1870s also affected the city's economic fortunes.
