= National Motorcycle Museum (Anamosa, Iowa) =

Coordinates: 42.108°N 91.284°W

- Company type: Museum
- Industry: Motorcycles and Auto
- Genre: Motorcycles
- Founded: 1989
- Defunct: 2023
- Headquarters: Anamosa, Iowa, United States
- Website: http://www.nationalmcmuseum.org

The National Motorcycle Museum was a non-profit museum located in Anamosa, Iowa. It was founded in 1989 by motorcycle builders, racers, and riders. Its purpose to maintain the experience of bikes past and present as well as motorcycle memorabilia, documents and actual vintage bikes from as far back as 1903. It was named Iowa Tourism Attraction of the Year in 2001.

The museum contains a collection of motorcycles over the past 100 years as well as thousands of photos, postcards and posters. The bikes come from all over the world; there are American, Japanese, British and other European motorcycles on display.

In 2010, the museum moved its collection of more than 300 motorcycles to a much larger building, and celebrated a grand re-opening in June 2011.

In 2023, it was announced that the museum would permanently close in September. The closing happened on September 5. Some of the museum's holdings will be auctioned to pay bills.

== Items ==
- Roadog
- Thor Model 13U
