= Scotch Grove, Iowa =

- Unincorporated community
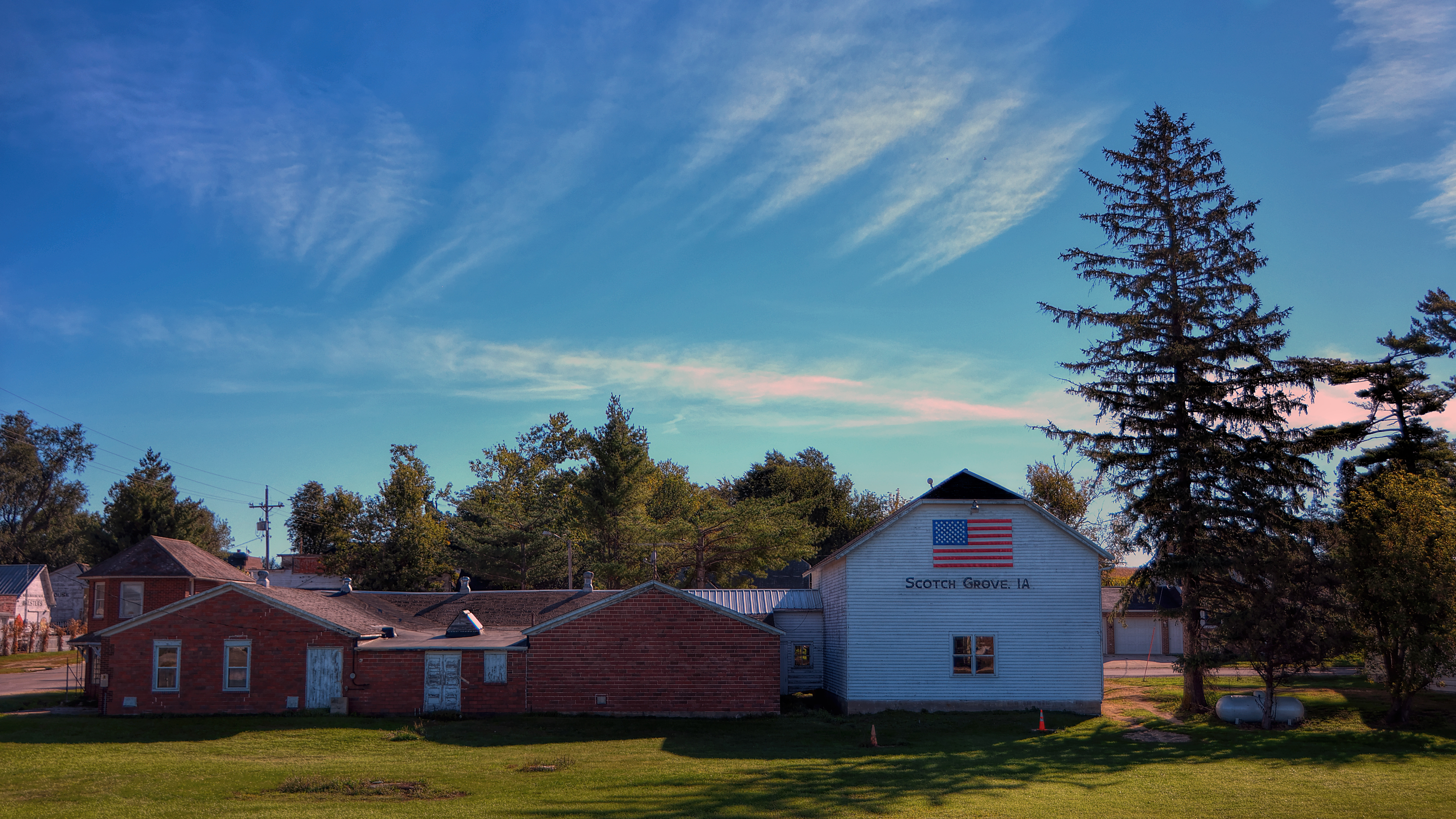
- The Scotch Grove historic district

- Location within Iowa Location within the United States
- Coordinates: 42°10′22″N 91°06′28″W
- Country: United States
- State: Iowa
- County: Jones
- Elevation: 876 ft (267 m)
- Time zone: UTC-6 (Central (CST))
  - Summer (DST): UTC-5 (CDT)
- Area code: 319
- GNIS feature ID: 461484
- Scotch Grove Historic District
- U.S. National Register of Historic Places
- U.S. Historic district
- Area: 22 acres (8.9 ha)
- NRHP reference No.: 13001137
- Added to NRHP: February 5, 2014

Scotch Grove is an unincorporated community in Jones County, Iowa, United States. Scotch Grove is located on Iowa Highway 38, southeast of Monticello and north of Center Junction. The townsite was listed as a historic district on the National Register of Historic Places in 2014.

== History ==
In 1837, the first settlers came to Scotch Grove. Most of these settlers were from the Red River Settlement, which was located in modern-day Winnipeg, Manitoba. They were sponsored by Lord Selkirk and known as the Selkirk Settlers. They had defended themselves from violent members of NW furtraders who tried to drive them out of the West. They were starved, killed, burned out and terrorized until they finally left. https://www.lordselkirk.ca/ Most families originated from Island of Mull, Scotland travelled to Hudson Bay 1812 and south by water to Lake Winnipeg and to the forks of Red river and Assiniboia River. These settlers were descendants of Scottish farmers who were evicted during the Highland Clearances.

The town of Scotch Grove was laid out in 1872 by James and Charles Applegate, on whose property the Davenport & St. Paul Railroad depot had been built the same year. The community developed as an agriculture-related business center in the heyday of Iowa's agricultural golden age between the 1890s and the 1920s. Unlike most other communities that developed along a railroad, it was never able to grow beyond a rural crossroads community. Scotch Grove's population in 1902 was 28. The population was 63 in 1940.

The historic district at the time of its nomination consisted of 52 resources, including 41 contributing buildings, three contributing structures, and eight non-contributing buildings. Among the historic buildings, there are 19 commercial-related buildings, 15 houses, two railroad-related buildings, three garages and two sheds. The historic structures include a silo and the two roads that form the crossroads. The buildings that are not considered historic are more recent construction.

== Notable person ==
- Roderick Dhu Sutherland, member of the United States House of Representatives, 1897–1901.
