= Anamosa, Iowa =

- City
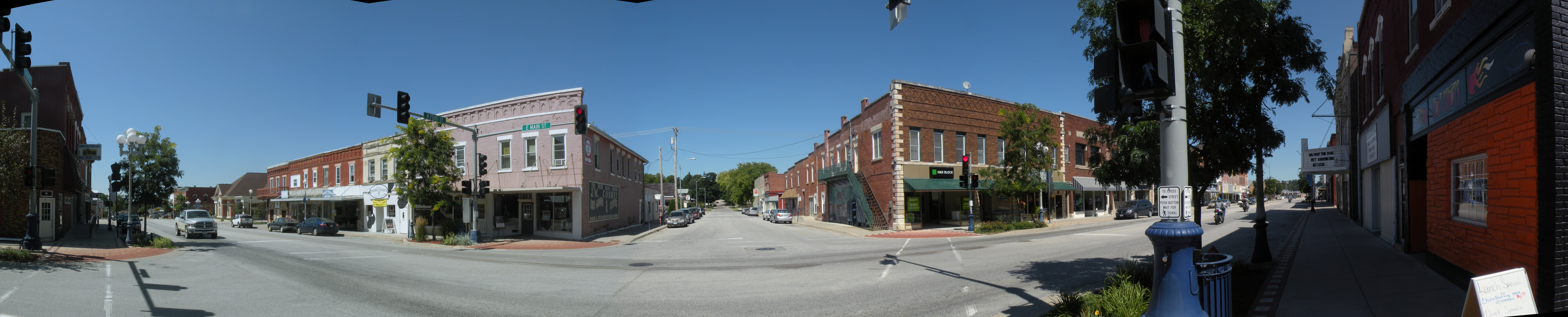
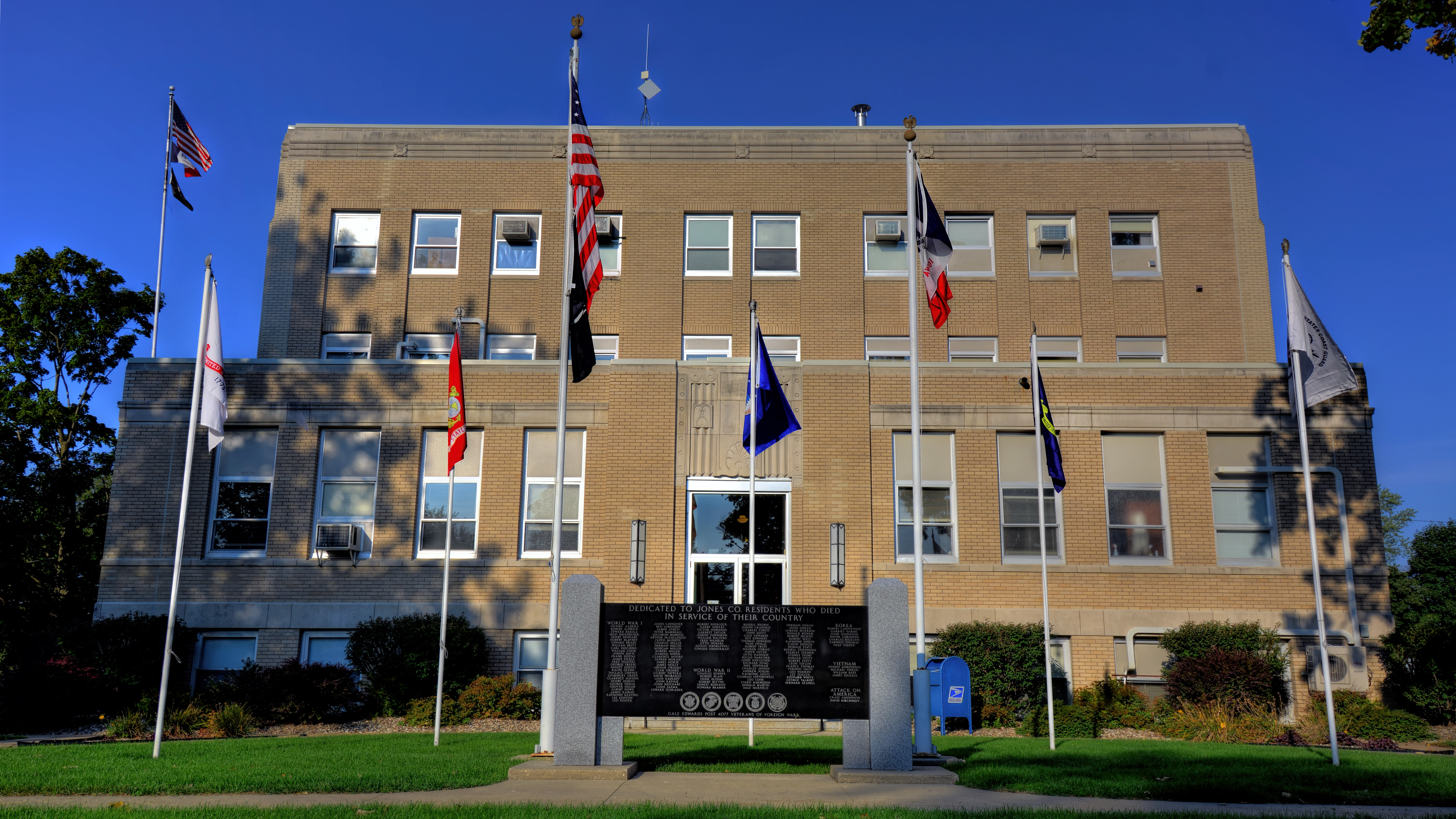
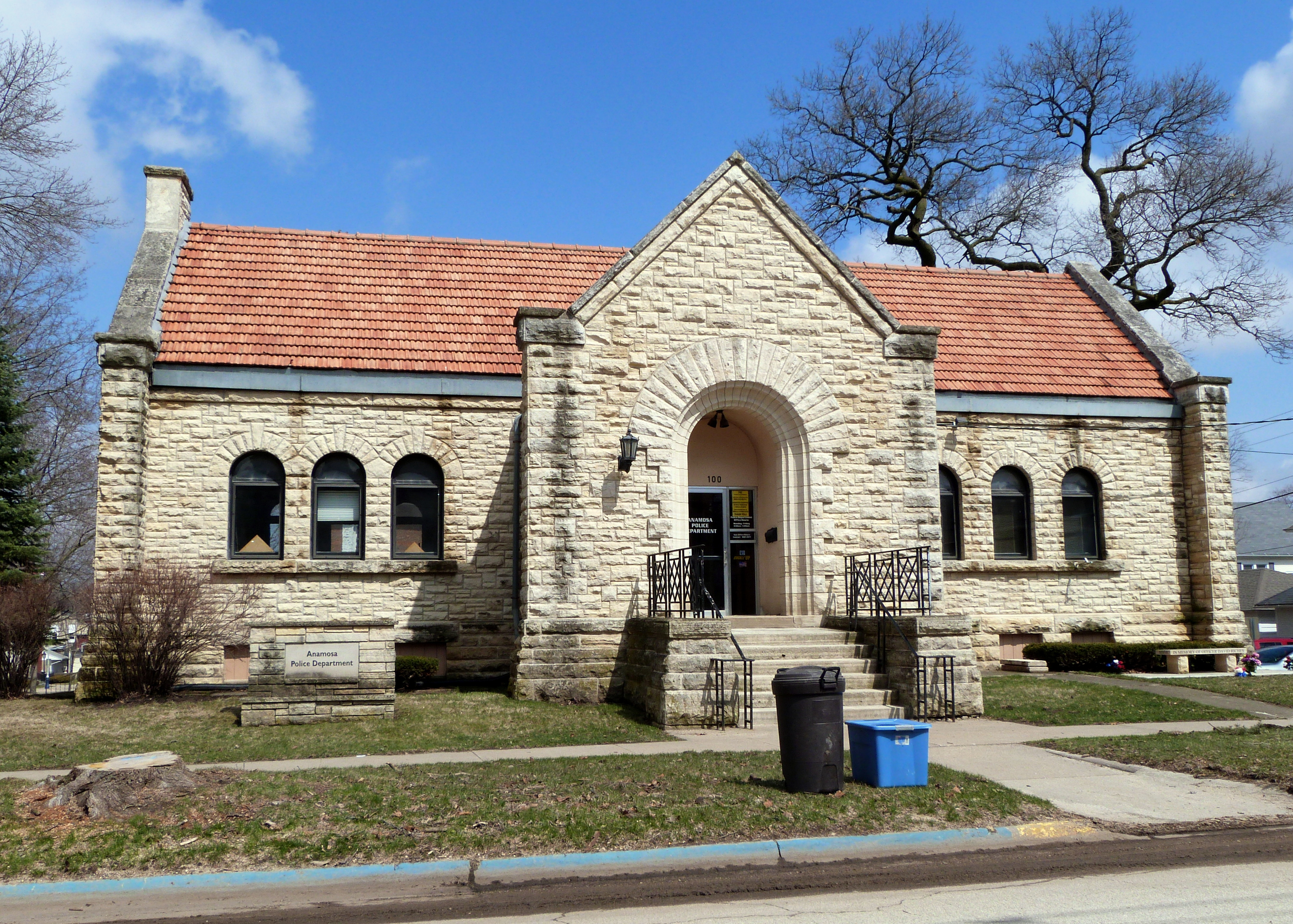
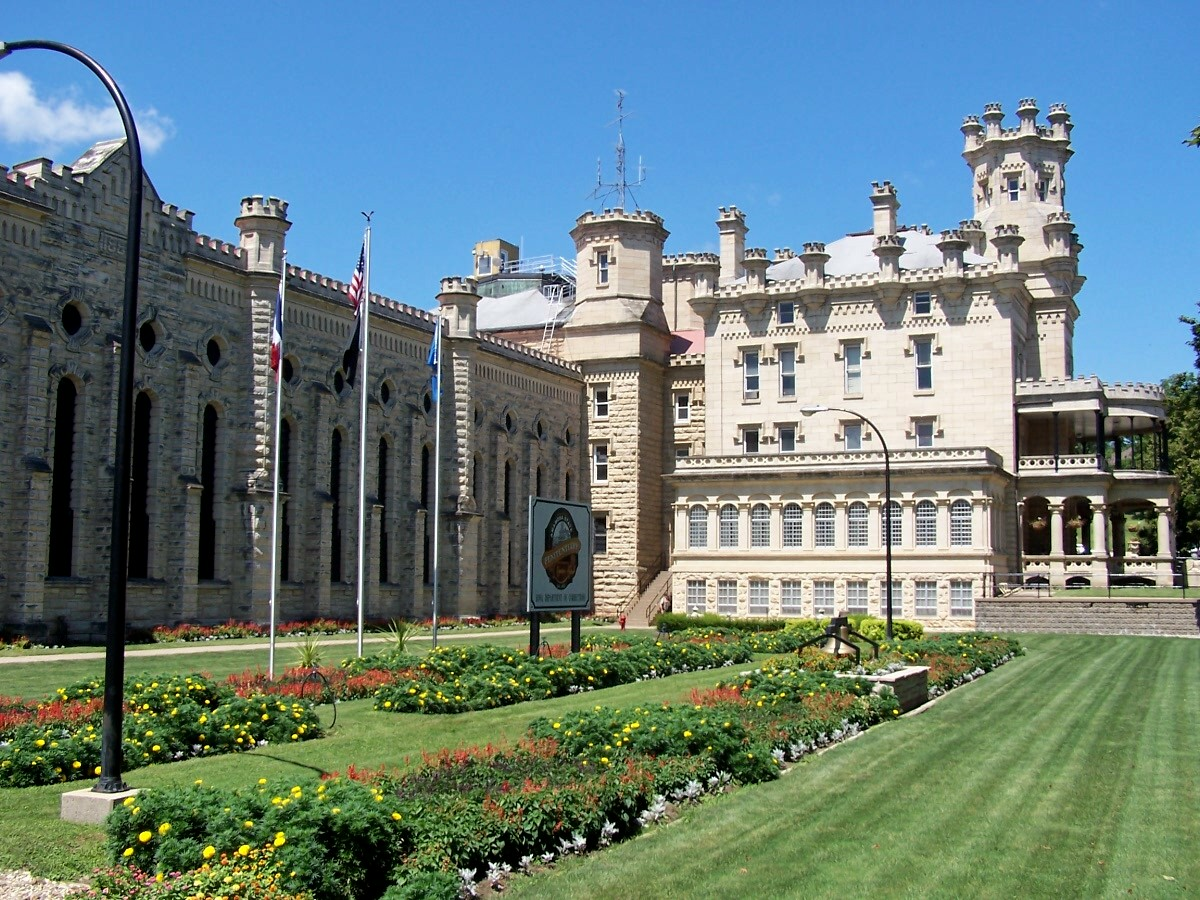
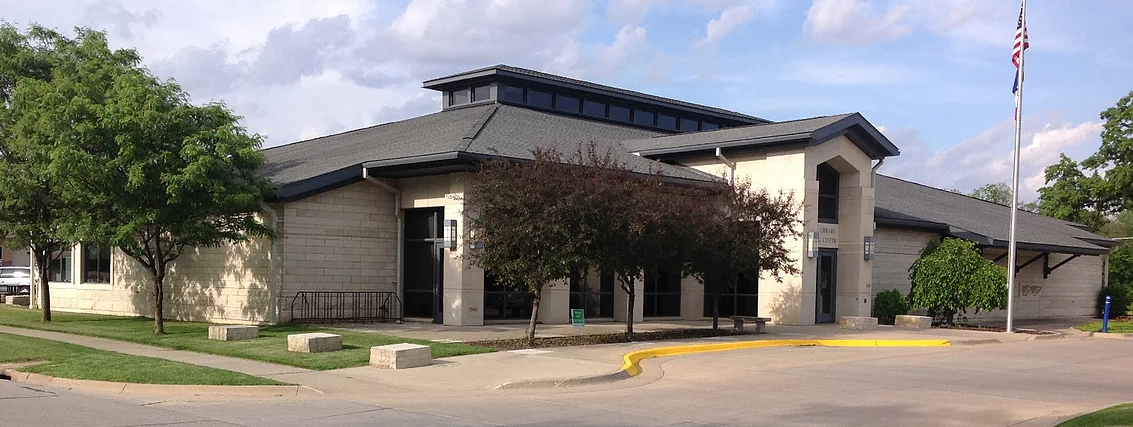
- Anamosa Main Street Historic District Jones County Courthouse Old library Anamosa State Penitentiary Library & Learning Center

- Flag
- Nickname: A-Town
- Location of Anamosa, Iowa
- Coordinates: 42°06′40″N 91°15′53″W
- Country: United States
- State: Iowa
- County: Jones

Area
  - Total: 2.53 sq mi (6.56 km^{2})
  - Land: 2.53 sq mi (6.54 km^{2})
  - Water: 0.0077 sq mi (0.02 km^{2})
- Elevation: 833 ft (254 m)

Population (2020)
  - Total: 5,450
  - Density: 2,159.3/sq mi (833.72/km^{2})
- Time zone: UTC-6 (Central (CST))
  - Summer (DST): UTC-5 (CDT)
- ZIP code: 52205
- Area code: 319
- FIPS code: 19-01990
- GNIS feature ID: 2393950
- Website: www.anamosa-iowa.org

Anamosa is a city in Jones County, Iowa, United States. The population was 5,450 at the 2020 census. It is the county seat of Jones County.

== History ==
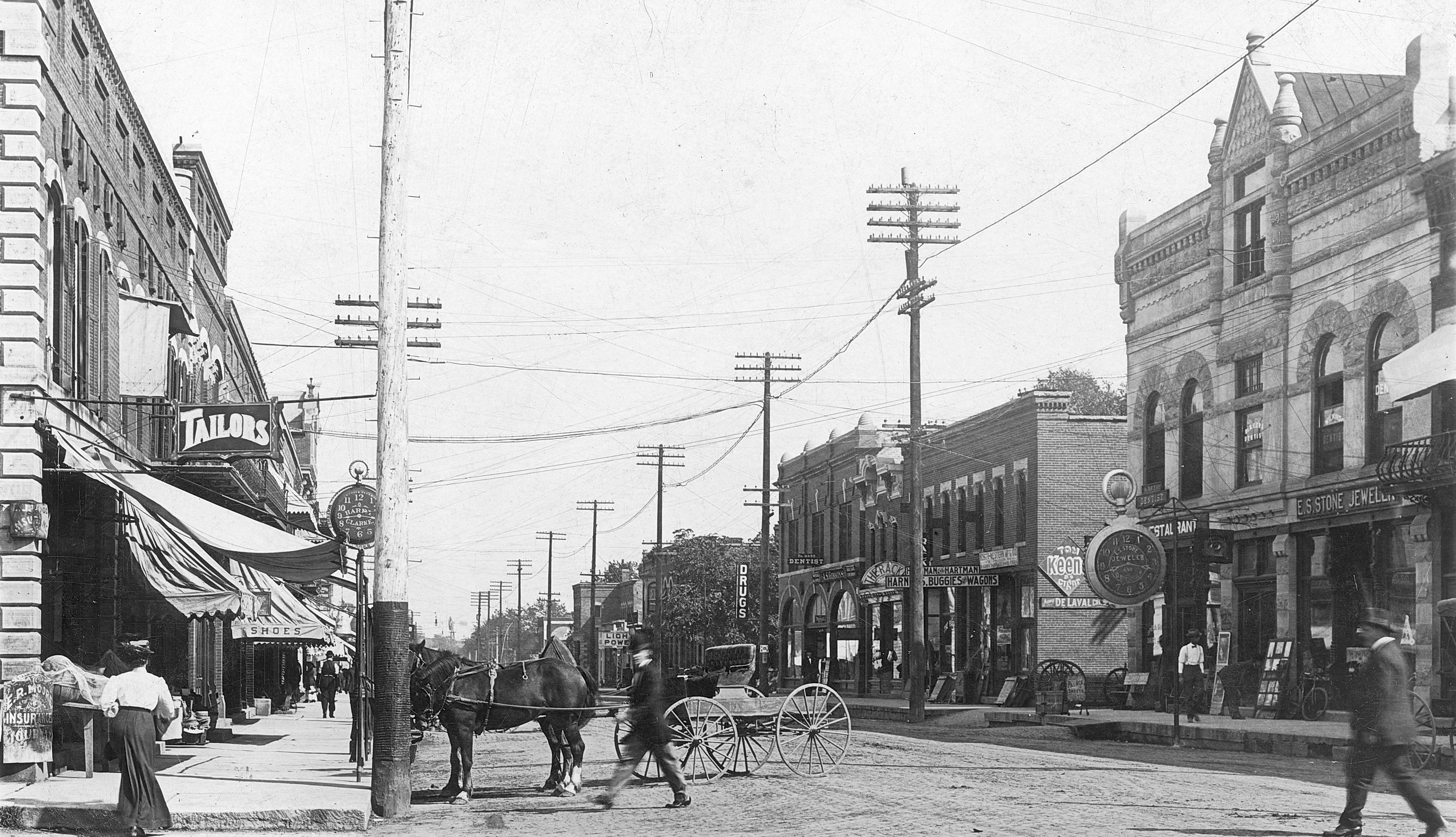
Main Street in Anamosa, 1913

What is now Anamosa was founded as the settlement of Buffalo Forks in 1838 and incorporated as Lexington in 1856. Lexington was a popular name for towns at that time, so when Lexington chose to become incorporated as a city in 1877, the name was changed to Anamosa to avoid mail delivery confusion. There are many stories on how Anamosa was chosen as a name. Some believe it was named for a local Native American girl named Anamosa, meaning "white fawn", while others say it means "You walk with me."

The romantic origin of the naming of the town of Anamosa comes from its early history. A Native American family was passing through town in 1842. The family stayed at the Ford House. The little girl, a Native American Princess, named Anamosa, endeared herself to the townspeople and following the family's departure from town, local citizens decided to name their town after her.

The Wapsipinicon River flows through Anamosa. According to legend, a Native American maiden and her lover threw themselves off a bluff overlooking the Wapsipinicon River; one was named Wapsi, the other Pinicon. Origins of this legend are unconfirmed.

Anamosa was named the Pumpkin Capital of Iowa by the Iowa State Legislature in 1993 and hosts Pumpkinfest, a pumpkin festival and weigh-off, each October.

The Anamosa Boot Hill Cemetery is still open today and is northwest of the town.

== Geography ==
According to the United States Census Bureau, the city has a total area of 2.61 square miles (6.76 km^{2}), of which 2.60 square miles (6.73 km^{2}) is land and 0.01 square miles (0.03 km^{2}) is water.

The Wapsipinicon River flows through the city of Anamosa. Anamosa is served by U.S. Route 151 and Iowa Highway 64.

== Demographics ==
Historical population
Census	Pop.	Note	%±
1860	889		—
1870	2,083		134.3%
1880	2,083		0.0%
1890	2,078		−0.2%
1900	2,891		39.1%
1910	2,983		3.2%
1920	2,881		−3.4%
1930	3,579		24.2%
1940	4,069		13.7%
1950	3,910		−3.9%
1960	4,616		18.1%
1970	4,389		−4.9%
1980	4,958		13.0%
1990	5,100		2.9%
2000	5,494		7.7%
2010	5,533		0.7%
2020	5,450		−1.5%
U.S. Decennial Census

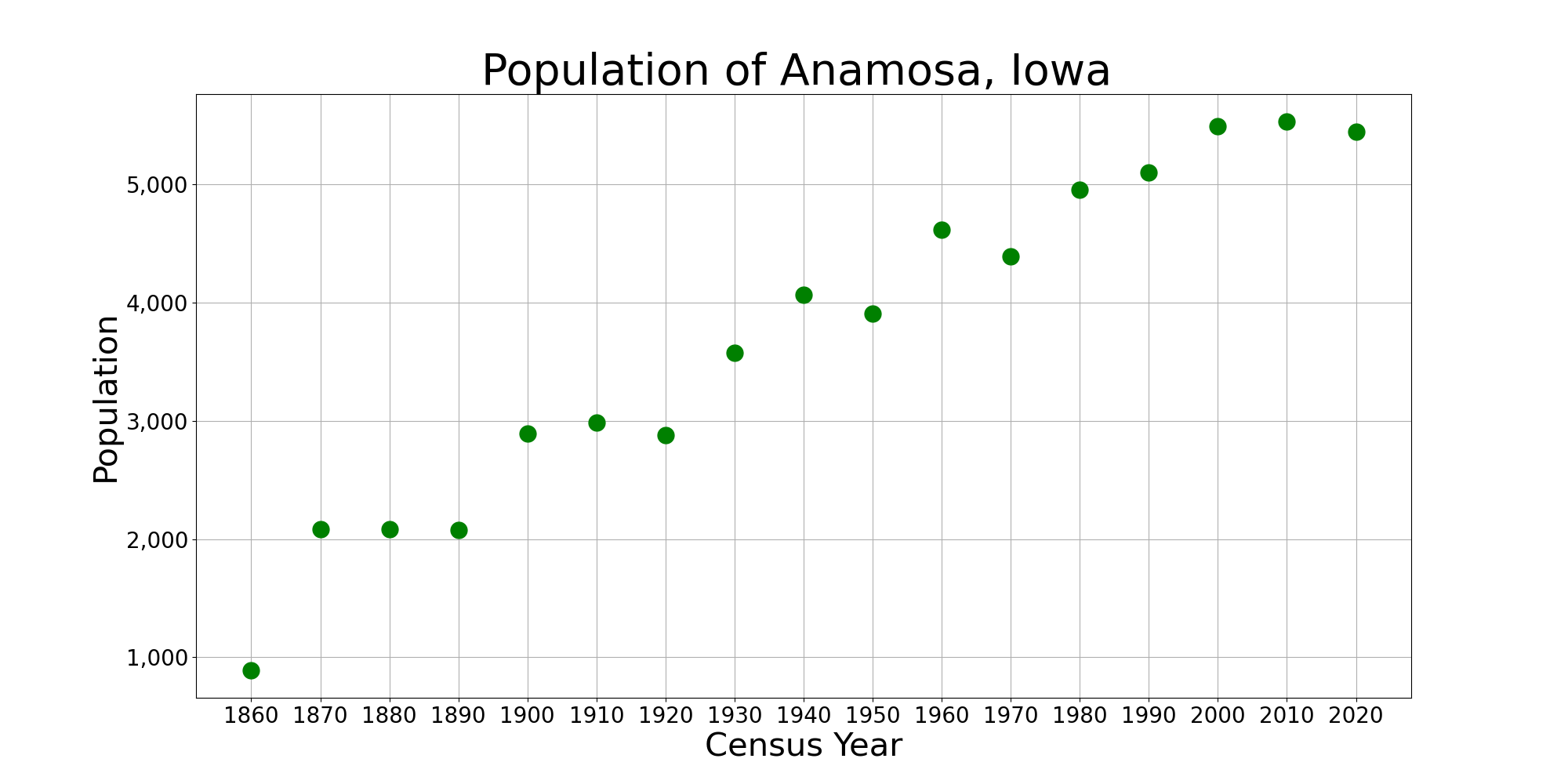
The population of Anamosa, Iowa from US census data

Anamosa is part of the Cedar Rapids metropolitan area.

=== 2020 census ===
As of the 2020 census, there were 5,450 people, 1,918 households, and 1,152 families residing in the city. The population density was 2,159.3 inhabitants per square mile (833.7/km^{2}). There were 2,112 housing units at an average density of 836.8 per square mile (323.1/km^{2}). 99.1% of residents lived in urban areas, while 0.9% lived in rural areas.

The median age in the city was 40.5 years. 21.1% of residents were under the age of 20, 19.1% were under the age of 18, and 18.6% were 65 years of age or older. 6.1% were between the ages of 20 and 24; 28.6% were from 25 to 44; and 25.6% were from 45 to 64. The gender makeup of the city was 57.2% male and 42.8% female. For every 100 females, there were 133.6 males, and for every 100 females age 18 and over, there were 142.3 males age 18 and over.

Of all households, 28.1% had children under the age of 18 living in them. 40.9% were married-couple households, 10.1% were cohabiting-couple households, 18.8% were households with a male householder and no spouse or partner present, and 30.2% were households with a female householder and no spouse or partner present. 39.9% of households were non-families, 33.8% of all households were made up of individuals, and 16.2% had someone living alone who was 65 years of age or older.

Of all housing units, 9.2% were vacant. The homeowner vacancy rate was 2.3% and the rental vacancy rate was 10.5%.

Racial composition as of the 2020 census
Race	Number	Percent
White	4,784	87.8%
Black or African American	346	6.3%
American Indian and Alaska Native	30	0.6%
Asian	32	0.6%
Native Hawaiian and Other Pacific Islander	2	0.0%
Some other race	35	0.6%
Two or more races	221	4.1%
Hispanic or Latino (of any race)	215	3.9%

=== 2010 census ===
As of the census of 2010, there were 5,533 people, 1,941 households, and 1,163 families residing in the city. The population density was 2,128.1 inhabitants per square mile (821.7/km^{2}). There were 2,105 housing units at an average density of 809.6 per square mile (312.6/km^{2}). The racial makeup of the city was 91.1% White, 6.4% African American, 0.4% Native American, 0.7% Asian, 0.4% from other races, and 0.9% from two or more races. Hispanic or Latino of any race were 2.0% of the population.

There were 1,941 households, of which 30.1% had children under the age of 18 living with them, 41.4% were married couples living together, 13.4% had a female householder with no husband present, 5.2% had a male householder with no wife present, and 40.1% were non-families. 34.5% of all households were made up of individuals, and 17.1% had someone living alone who was 65 years of age or older. The average household size was 2.25 and the average family size was 2.87.

The median age in the city was 39.6 years. 19.6% of residents were under the age of 18; 8.8% were between the ages of 18 and 24; 29.8% were from 25 to 44; 24.6% were from 45 to 64; and 17.2% were 65 years of age or older. The gender makeup of the city was 56.8% male and 43.2% female.

=== 2000 census ===
As of the census of 2000, there were 5,494 people, 1,750 households, and 1,135 families residing in the city. The population density was 2,453.4 inhabitants per square mile (947.3/km^{2}). There were 1,884 housing units at an average density of 841.3 per square mile (324.8/km^{2}). The racial makeup of the city was 90.70% White, 6.06% African American, 0.71% Native American, 0.51% Asian, 0.69% from other races, and 1.33% from two or more races. Hispanic or Latino of any race were 2.17% of the population.

There were 1,750 households, out of which 30.6% had children under the age of 18 living with them, 50.2% were married couples living together, 11.9% had a female householder with no husband present, and 35.1% were non-families. 29.7% of all households were made up of individuals, and 14.9% had someone living alone who was 65 years of age or older. The average household size was 2.35 and the average family size was 2.89.

Age spread: 19.7% under the age of 18, 11.1% from 18 to 24, 35.5% from 25 to 44, 19.3% from 45 to 64, and 14.5% who were 65 years of age or older. The median age was 36 years. For every 100 females, there were 145.8 males. For every 100 females age 18 and over, there were 158.8 males.

The median income for a household in the city was $33,284, and the median income for a family was $39,702. Males had a median income of $31,938 versus $25,248 for females. The per capita income for the city was $18,585. About 7.1% of families and 8.1% of the population were below the poverty line, including 12.7% of those under age 18 and 2.8% of those age 65 or over.

== Landmarks and industry ==
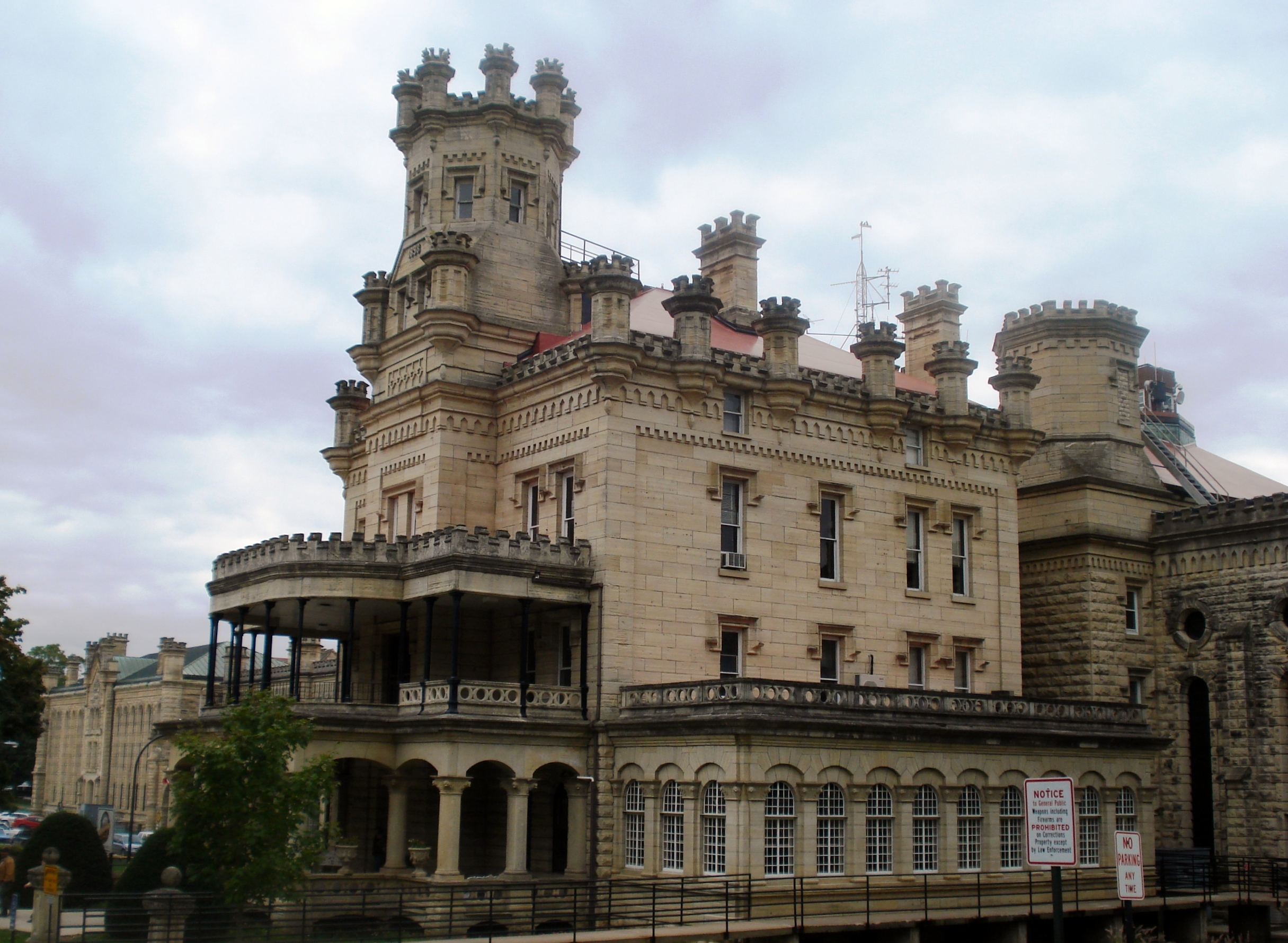
Anamosa State Penitentiary

Anamosa is home to the Anamosa State Penitentiary, formerly known as the Iowa Men's Reformatory, a medium/maximum security prison that is the largest in Iowa, housing over 1,200 male inmates. Anamosa State Penitentiary was home to infamous criminal John Wayne Gacy as well as Robert Hansen, the inspiration for the movie Frozen Ground. It was established in 1872 and constructed from locally quarried Anamosa Limestone in the style of a castle, inspiring its nickname as "The White Palace of the West". The prison grounds also house the Anamosa State Penitenitiary Museum, which contains artifacts and exhibits on prison life from throughout its history.

Motorcycles have been a common sight in Anamosa. Anamosa was home to J&P Cycles, a supplier of aftermarket motorcycle parts and accessories, until its last operations in town closed at the end of 2023 and was home to the National Motorcycle Museum, until its closing in September 2023. The museum had over 300 vintage motorcycles, including a replica of the "Captain America bike" from the movie Easy Rider.

Anamosa was the birthplace and burial place of the regionalist artist Grant Wood; he is buried in Riverside Cemetery, next to a large monument of a recumbent lion. Visitors can view a collection of satirical interpretations of his most famous work American Gothic at the Grant Wood Art Gallery on Main Street.

The unincorporated town of Stone City is a few miles northwest of Anamosa and was the location for some of Grant Wood's paintings. Historic buildings built of local stone are still standing. The quarry that supplied the limestone still exists today as Weber Stone Company.

Wapsipinicon State Park is on the southwest edge of the city. The Hale Bridge is inside the park. The Iowa Army National Guard flew the three spans of the Hale Bridge from the Olin/Hale staging areas to the new home across the Wapsipinicon River at Wapsipinicon State Park by helicopter.

== Education ==
Anamosa Community School District operates schools serving this community.

Additionally St. Patrick School, of the Roman Catholic Archdiocese of Dubuque, is in Anamosa. The school opened in 1944.

== Redistricting ==
Controversy arose in Anamosa in the 2000s over the redistricting of election wards in the city. Because the boundaries of the city's four wards were drawn to encompass equal numbers of residents, and because the inmates of the Anamosa State Penitentiary — who are ineligible to vote — were counted among the population of the second ward, the voting population of the second ward was significantly smaller than that of any of the other three wards. Consequently, the power of each vote in the second ward was much greater than the power of a vote in any of the city's other wards. In 2007, city residents voted to end the system of wards; since 2008, all city council elections have been at-large.

== Notable people ==
- Edmund Booth, deaf pioneer who helped establish the town of Anamosa
- Sarah Corpstein, Miss Iowa USA 2006
- Clem F. Kimball, Lieutenant Governor of Iowa
- Lillian Ruth Matthews (1878–1938), social worker and California state official
- Andy McKean, Iowa State Representative for District 58
- Scott Newhard, Iowa state representative
- Don Norton, (1938–1997), American Football League San Diego Chargers' receiver
- Lawrence Schoonover, American novelist
- Grant Wood, artist, creator of American Gothic and Arbor Day (on the state quarter)
- Marshal Yanda, longtime Baltimore Ravens starting offensive lineman
