= Haldane =

Haldane is a surname and a given name, which may refer to:

== People ==
- Clan Haldane, a Lowland Scottish clan

=== Surname ===
- A. R. B. Haldane (1900–1982), Scottish social historian and author
- Andrew Haldane (1917–1944), United States Marine Corps officer killed in action during World War II
- Andy Haldane (born 1967), British economist
- Aylmer Haldane (1862–1950), British Army general
- Benjamin Haldane (1874–1941), Tsimshian professional photographer from Metlakatla, Alaska
- Bert Haldane (1871–1937), British silent film director
- Charlotte Haldane née Franken (1894–1969), British feminist writer; wife of J. B. S. Haldane
- Daniel Rutherford Haldane (1824–1887), Scottish physician; son of James Haldane (second marriage)
- Douglas Haldane (1926–2012), Scottish child psychiatrist and pioneer of family therapy
- Duncan Haldane (born 1951), British physicist, Princeton University professor and Nobel Prize laureate
- Elizabeth Sanderson Haldane (1862–1937), Scottish author, biographer, philosopher, suffragist, nursing administrator, and social welfare worker
- George Haldane (1722–1759), British Army brigadier general, Governor of Jamaica and Member of Parliament
- Graeme Haldane (1897–1981), Scottish engineer
- J. B. S. Haldane (1892–1964), British geneticist and evolutionary biologist; son of John Scott Haldane and brother of Naomi Mitchison née Haldane
- James Haldane (disambiguation), multiple people
- John Scott Haldane (1860–1936), British physician physiologist and philosopher; father of J. B. S. Haldane
- John Joseph Haldane (born 1954), British philosopher
- Lewis Haldane (born 1985), Welsh footballer
- Mungo Haldane (c. 1682–1755), Scottish Member of Parliament
- Naomi Mitchison (1897–1999), née Haldane, Scottish writer; daughter of John Scott Haldane and sister of J. B. S. Haldane
- Patrick Haldane of Gleneagles (c. 1683–1769), Scottish classicist, advocate, and politician, joint Solicitor-General for Scotland 1746–55
- Richard Haldane, 1st Viscount Haldane (1856–1928), British lawyer and philosopher and an influential Liberal and later Labour politician
- Robert Haldane (1764–1842), Scottish churchman
- Shona Haldane, Lady Haldane, Scottish judge
- William Haldane (1864–1951), Crown Agent for Scotland; grandson of James Haldane, brother of Elizabeth, John Scott and Richard Haldane

=== Given name ===
- Haldane Burgess (1862–1927), Shetland historian, poet, novelist, violinist, linguist and socialist
- Haldane Douglas (1892–1980), American art director
- Haldane Duncan (1940–2018), Scottish television producer and director
- Haldane MacFall (1860–1928), British Army officer and art critic
- Haldane Robert Mayer (born 1941), Senior United States Circuit Judge of the United States Court of Appeals for the Federal Circuit and law professor
- Haldane Stewart (1868–1942), English musician, composer and cricketer
- Haldane Philp Tait (1911–1990), Scottish doctor and healthcare writer
- Haldane Colquhoun Turriff (1834–1922), Australian hospital nurse and administrator

== Fictional characters ==
- the title character of Haldane of the Secret Service, a 1923 American silent adventure film

== See also ==
- Haldan (disambiguation)
