= Haldane (disambiguation) =

Haldane is a given name and surname. It may also refer to:

- Haldane, Illinois, United States, an unincorporated community
- Haldane (lunar crater), on the Moon
- Haldane (Martian crater), on the planet Mars
- Haldane Building, a historic building in Garnethill, Glasgow, Scotland

== See also ==
- Haldane effect, a property of hemoglobin first described by John Scott Haldane
- Haldane Society of Socialist Lawyers, a socialist and legal campaigning organisation in the United Kingdom
