= Savanna–Sabula Bridge =

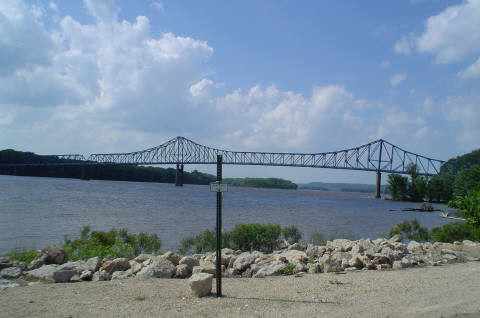
- May 2004
- Coordinates: 42°06′16″N 90°09′38″W
- Carried: US 52 / IL 64 / Iowa 64
- Crossed: Mississippi River
- Locale: Savanna, Illinois, and Jackson County near Sabula, Iowa, River Mile 537.8
- Maintained by: IDOT
- ID number: NBI 000000000029940

Characteristics
- Design: Steel truss bridge
- Total length: 2,482 ft (757 m)
- Width: 20 ft (6.1 m), 2 lanes
- Longest span: 520 ft (160 m)
- Clearance above: 17.1 ft (5.2 m)
- Clearance below: 51 ft (16 m)

History
- Opened: December 31, 1932
- Closed: November 17, 2017
- Demolished: March 9, 2018
- Replaced by: Dale Gardner Veterans Memorial Bridge

Statistics
- Daily traffic: 2,170 (2015)
- Savanna–Sabula Bridge
- U.S. National Register of Historic Places
- MPS: Highway Bridges of Iowa MPS
- NRHP reference No.: 99001033
- Added to NRHP: August 27, 1999

Location
- Interactive map of Savanna–Sabula Bridge

The Savanna–Sabula Bridge was a truss bridge and causeway crossing the Mississippi River that connected the city of Savanna, Illinois, with the island city of Sabula, Iowa. The bridge was put out of service on November 17, 2017, when its replacement, which lies a few dozen feet downstream, opened as the Dale Gardner Veterans Memorial Bridge. The bridge carried U.S. Route 52 over the river. It was also the terminus of both Iowa Highway 64 and Illinois Route 64. The bridge carried an average of 2,170 vehicles daily as of 2015, with 6% of that being truck traffic.

It was added to the National Register of Historic Places in 1999.

The bridge was demolished on March 9, 2018.

== Replacement bridge ==
Construction of an $80.6 million replacement for the 1932 Savanna–Sabula Bridge was finished and opened to traffic on November 17, 2017, while the old bridge was subsequently demolished. The Illinois House of Representatives unanimously named this new structure the Dale Gardner Veterans Memorial Bridge in honor of Dale Gardner, a Savanna born NASA astronaut.

== See also ==
- List of crossings of the Upper Mississippi River
