= U.S. Route 52 =

Highway in the United States

U.S. Route 52
- US 52 highlighted in red

Route information
- Length: 2,072 mi (3,335 km)
- Existed: 1926–present

Major junctions
- West end: Highway 39 at the Canadian border in Portal, ND
- I-35W in Minneapolis, MN; I-35E in St. Paul, MN; I-90 in Rochester, MN; I-55 in Shorewood, IL; I-80 in Joliet, IL; I-65 near Lebanon, IN; I-70 in Indianapolis, IN; I-75 in Cincinnati, OH; I-40 in Winston-Salem, NC; I-85 in Lexington, NC; I-95 near Florence, SC
- East end: Line Street in Charleston, SC

Location
- Country: United States
- States: North Dakota, Minnesota, Iowa, Illinois, Indiana, Ohio, West Virginia, Kentucky, Virginia, North Carolina, South Carolina

Highway system
- United States Numbered Highway System; List; Special; Divided
← US 51	US	→ US 53
← SR 51	IN	→ SR 53
← US 51	KY	→ KY 52

U.S. Route 52 (US 52) is a major U.S. Highway in the Central United States that extends from the northern to southeastern region of the United States. Contrary to most other even-numbered U.S. Highways, US 52 primarily follows a northwest–southeast route, and it is signed north–south or east–west depending on the local orientation of the route. The highway's northwestern terminus is in Portal, North Dakota, at the Canadian border, where it continues as Saskatchewan Highway 39. Its southeastern terminus is in Charleston, South Carolina, at Number 2 Meeting Street and White Point Garden along the Charleston Harbor.

== Route description ==
Lengths
	mi	km
ND	361	581
MN	377	607
IA	164	264
IL	216	348
IN	198	319
OH	190	310
WV/KY	186	299
VA	85	137
NC	150	240
SC	161	259
Total	2,072	3,335

=== North Dakota ===
In North Dakota, US 52 continues from Highway 39 from the Canadian border at North Portal, Saskatchewan, and Portal, North Dakota, to the Red River in Fargo, a distance of 361 miles (581 km). US 52 is co-signed with US 2 near Minot, where it also intersects with US 83. US 52 is also co-signed with US 281 for 44 miles (71 km) between Jamestown and Carrington. US 52 is concurrent with Interstate 94 (I-94) between Jamestown and the Minnesota state line, co-signed between Jamestown and Fargo; however, all of the interchanges for the Fargo–West Fargo portion of the route are unsigned.

=== Minnesota ===
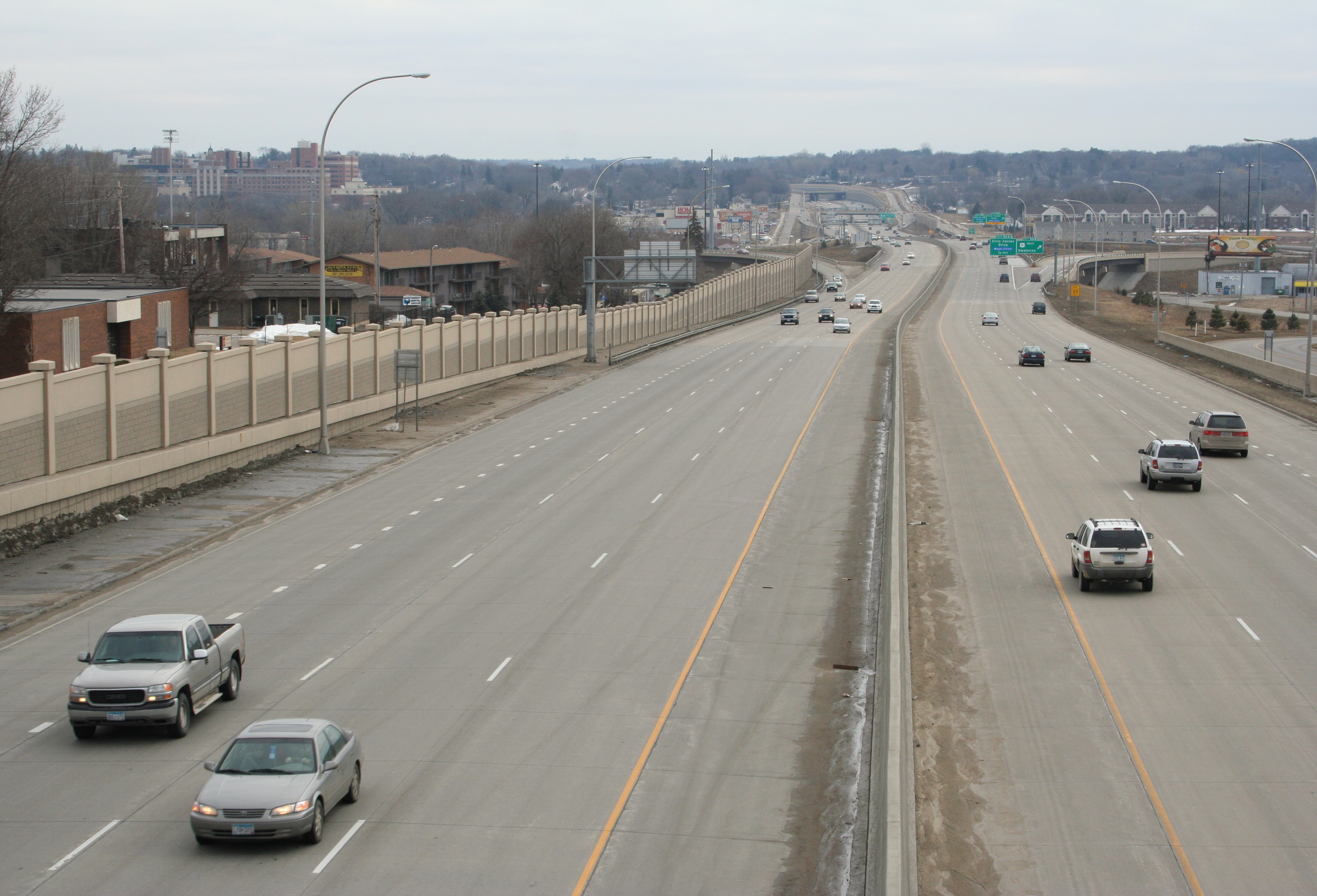
US 52 in Rochester

In the state of Minnesota, US 52 enters the state with I-94 at Moorhead and follows I-94 southeasterly all the way to the Twin Cities. The portion of the highway which overlaps I-94 is unsigned. From Downtown St. Paul, US 52 continues on its own southeast over the Lafayette Bridge in St. Paul, continuing as an expressway to Rochester and the Iowa state line. The Minnesota Department of Transportation has a long-term goal of making US 52 a freeway with limited-access interchanges between St. Paul and I-90 south of Rochester. South from I-94 in St. Paul there is a freeway segment to just south of Concord Boulevard in Inver Grove Heights. The portion of the highway between Inver Grove Heights and Pine Island is built to expressway standards. Another freeway segment begins from Pine Island, through Rochester reaching its largest single capacity in Minnesota through Rochester as a six- to eight-lane freeway, toward I-90 where it converts to a rural two-lane highway. The highway then proceeds to the Iowa state line.

=== Iowa ===
US 52 enters Iowa north of the unincorporated community of Burr Oak. It passes by Luther College on the west side of Decorah. At Calmar the road turns to a southwest–northeast orientation. It joins with US 18 just to the west of Postville. The two highways overlap until a point east of the unincorporated community of Froelich. US 52 roughly parallels the Mississippi River for the rest of its path through Iowa to Dyersville, where it intersects and joins US 20 and turns eastward towards Dubuque.

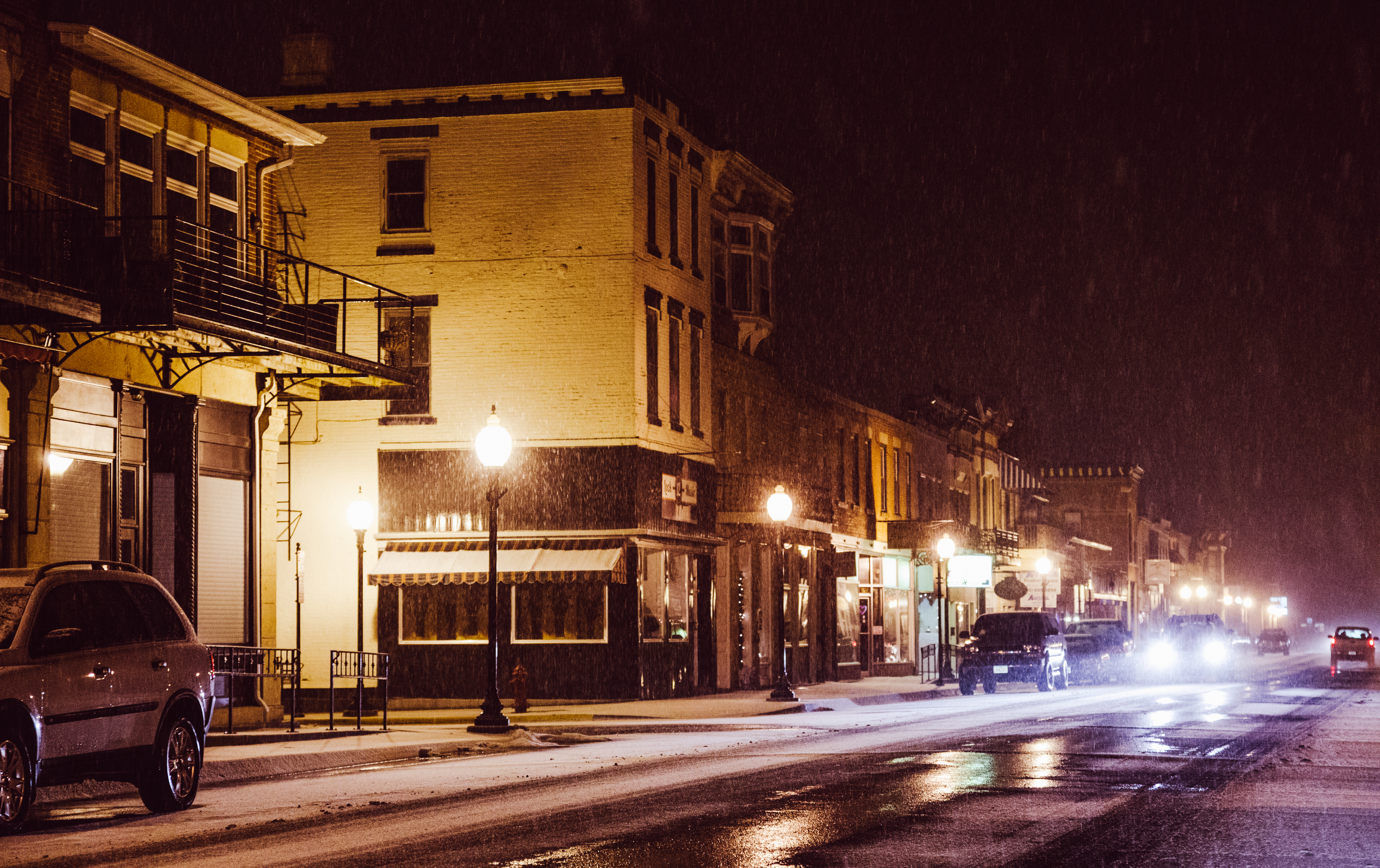
US 52 in downtown Bellevue

West of Dubuque, US 52 merges south onto the Southwest Arterial, a four-lane expressway directing traffic around the southern edge of the city. US 52 heads southeast to a junction with US 61 and US 151. All three routes travel northbound (even US 52, which is signed as southbound) as an expressway, until US 52 departs in Key West to remain close to the Mississippi River. After passing through a hilly and scenic region, including the small river city of Bellevue, the highway turns to an east–west orientation near Sabula at the junction of Iowa 64 and the northern terminus of US 67. In Sabula, the highway becomes a wrong-way road; northbound traffic travels south, and vice versa, from Sabula to the Dale Gardner Veterans Memorial Bridge, where US 52 crosses over the Mississippi River into Illinois.

North of Dubuque, US 52 was formerly routed onto a narrow and winding road, concurrently with Iowa 3. While scenic, the road has been the scene of numerous accidents over the years owing to this nature. Between 1964 and 1967, this segment of the route was designated Alternate US 52 and US 52 was rerouted south from Luxemburg to Dyersville along Iowa Highway 136, and east from Dyersville to Dubuque along US 20; however in 1967, US 52 was restored to the Iowa Highway 3 alignment. After the completion of the Southwest Arterial in 2020, a similar change took place as US 52 was once again removed from the Iowa Highway 3 alignment and again routed from Luxemburg to Dyersville to Dubuque, then onto the Southwest Arterial, to US 61/US 151, finally reaching its former routing at Key West.

The majority of US 52 in Iowa is located within the unglaciated Driftless Area.

=== Illinois ===
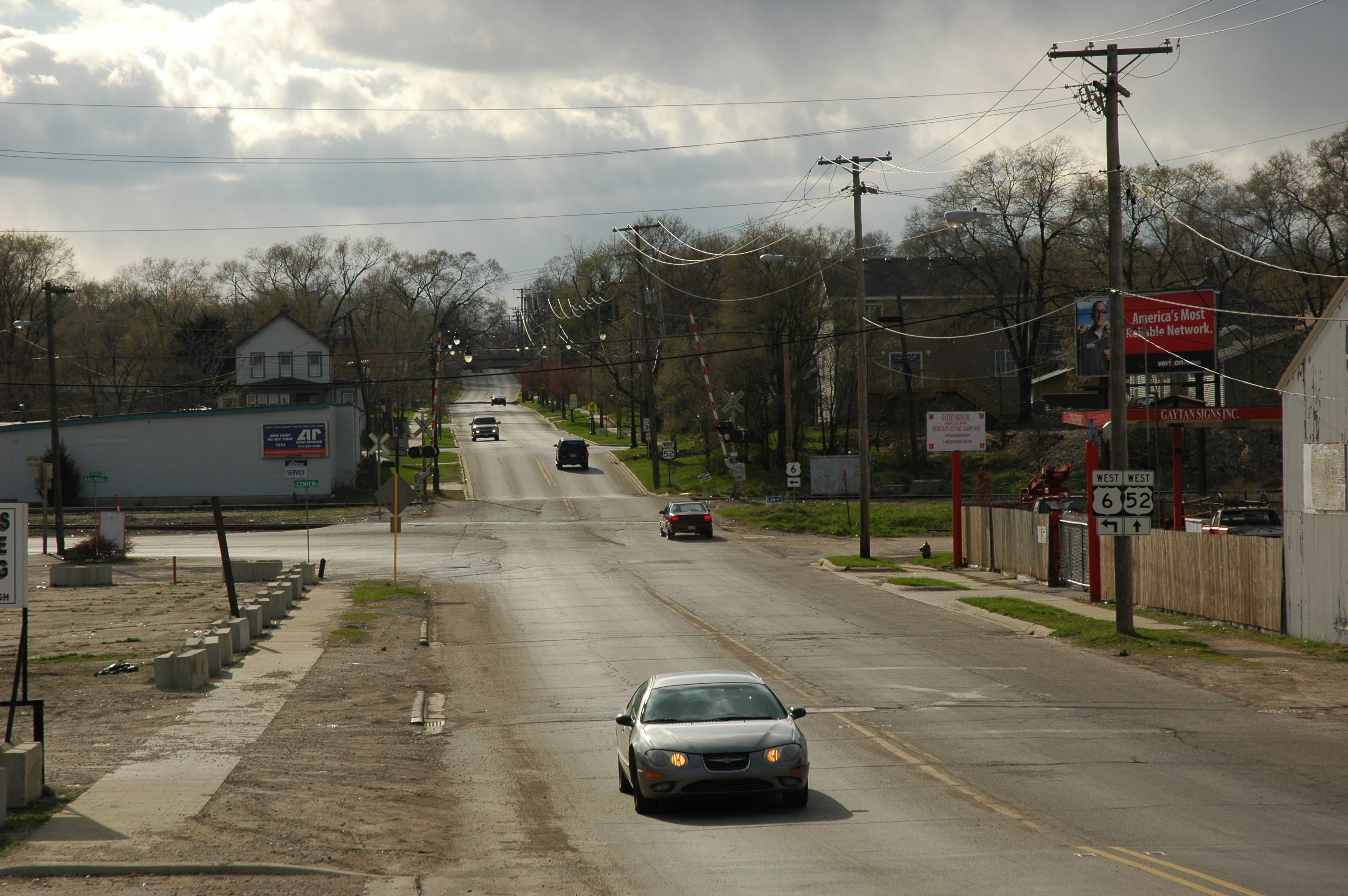
Looking west at the western US 52 and US 6 (McDonough Street) split on the southwest side of Joliet, Illinois.

In Illinois, US 52 runs southeast from the Dale Gardner Veterans Memorial Bridge at the terminus of Iowa Highway 64 and Illinois Route 64 in Savanna, passing through the cities of Dixon, Amboy and Mendota. US 52 then turns due south and then east, crossing I-39 near Troy Grove. It continues east, passing through Shorewood and then through the southern portion of Joliet, where it is a major thoroughfare in the city of Joliet (Jefferson Street), avoiding the city of Chicago proper. It joins with US 45 through Kankakee, thereafter running concurrently with US 24, east of Watseka to the Indiana state line.

=== Indiana ===
In Indiana, US 52 runs in a northwest–southeast direction. It passes through Lafayette where it used to be on Sagamore Parkway, but was later rerouted onto the US 231 bypass and Teal Road. Northwest of Indianapolis, US 52 runs along the same general area as, and is considered an alternative route to, I-65. In the Indianapolis area, it is overlapped with I-865, I-465, and I-69. East of Indianapolis, it is considered an alternative to I-74 before joining it near the Ohio state line.

When US 52 went through Downtown Indianapolis, it went onto Brookville Road, then turned left onto English Avenue. It then joined US 421 when it turned onto Southeastern Avenue. US 52/US 421 joined US 40 when it turned onto Washington Street. It then split into Washington Street (westbound) and Maryland Street (eastbound). US 52 then turned onto West Street (from West Street, it turned onto Maryland Street). US 52 turned on 16th Street, where it would overlap US 136. It then turned onto Lafayette Road, which became Indianapolis Road when reaching Zionsville. When I-65 was completed through Downtown Indianapolis, US 52 got on I-65 from the Lafayette Road interchange, and traveled on I-65 the rest of the way. In 1970, the route was re-routed onto the south belt of I-465 from Brookville Road to I-65. It was re-routed again on its current route around Indianapolis in either 2000 or 2001.

=== Ohio ===
US 52 enters Ohio concurrently with I-74 in northwestern Hamilton County. US 52 then merges with I-75 from I-74's terminus and exits onto Hopple Street in Cincinnati. It runs along Central Parkway and Central Avenue through downtown and then skirts the Cincinnati riverfront along Mehring Way past Paycor Stadium (formerly Paul Brown Stadium), Great American Ball Park, and Heritage Bank Center (formerly U.S. Bank Arena), onto Pete Rose Way and Riverside Drive. From Cincinnati eastward, US 52 generally follows the Ohio River. There is a brief concurrency with I-275 near California, a neighborhood on the far eastern edge of the city of Cincinnati. Towns along its path include New Richmond, Aberdeen, Ripley and Manchester. The section between I-275 and New Richmond was modernized in the 1960s; parts of the old route run parallel to the newer highway. Around Portsmouth and Ironton US 52 has several freeway or expressway sections. In Portsmouth, US 52 intersects with US 23. At Chesapeake, US 52 crosses the Ohio River into Huntington, West Virginia.

The sections of US 52 that follow the Ohio River are known as the Ohio River Scenic Byway, which is part of the National Scenic Byway Project. The section between State Route 125 (SR 125) and SR 73 (near Portsmouth) is also designated as Scenic Scioto Heritage Trail. This portion of US 52, along the Ohio between Cincinnati and Huntington, is the only part where it falls in geographical sequence, south of US 50 and north of US 60.

US 52 passes by the birthplace of President Ulysses S. Grant in Point Pleasant.

=== West Virginia and Kentucky ===
US 52 serves western and southern portions of West Virginia, running from Huntington to Bluefield. The highway is undergoing a major expansion project which began in 2007 and at current funding levels is likely to take many years to finish.

During its run through West Virginia, US 52 twice enters Kentucky briefly, along the Williamson, West Virginia, bypass, in order to prevent the blasting of several hillsides in West Virginia. These stretches were completed in 1996 as part of the Corridor G (US 119) project. The speed limit in West Virginia is 65 mph (105 km/h), but drops to 55 mph (89 km/h) along the Kentucky portions, as Kentucky law states that any non-freeway (as is US 52) must not have a higher speed limit. In each instance, however, US 52 re-enters West Virginia.

=== Virginia ===
US 52 enters Virginia from West Virginia, and in Virginia closely follows I-77. It enters southwestern Virginia near Bluefield and passes through Wytheville and Hillsville before leaving the state south of Cana.

=== North Carolina ===
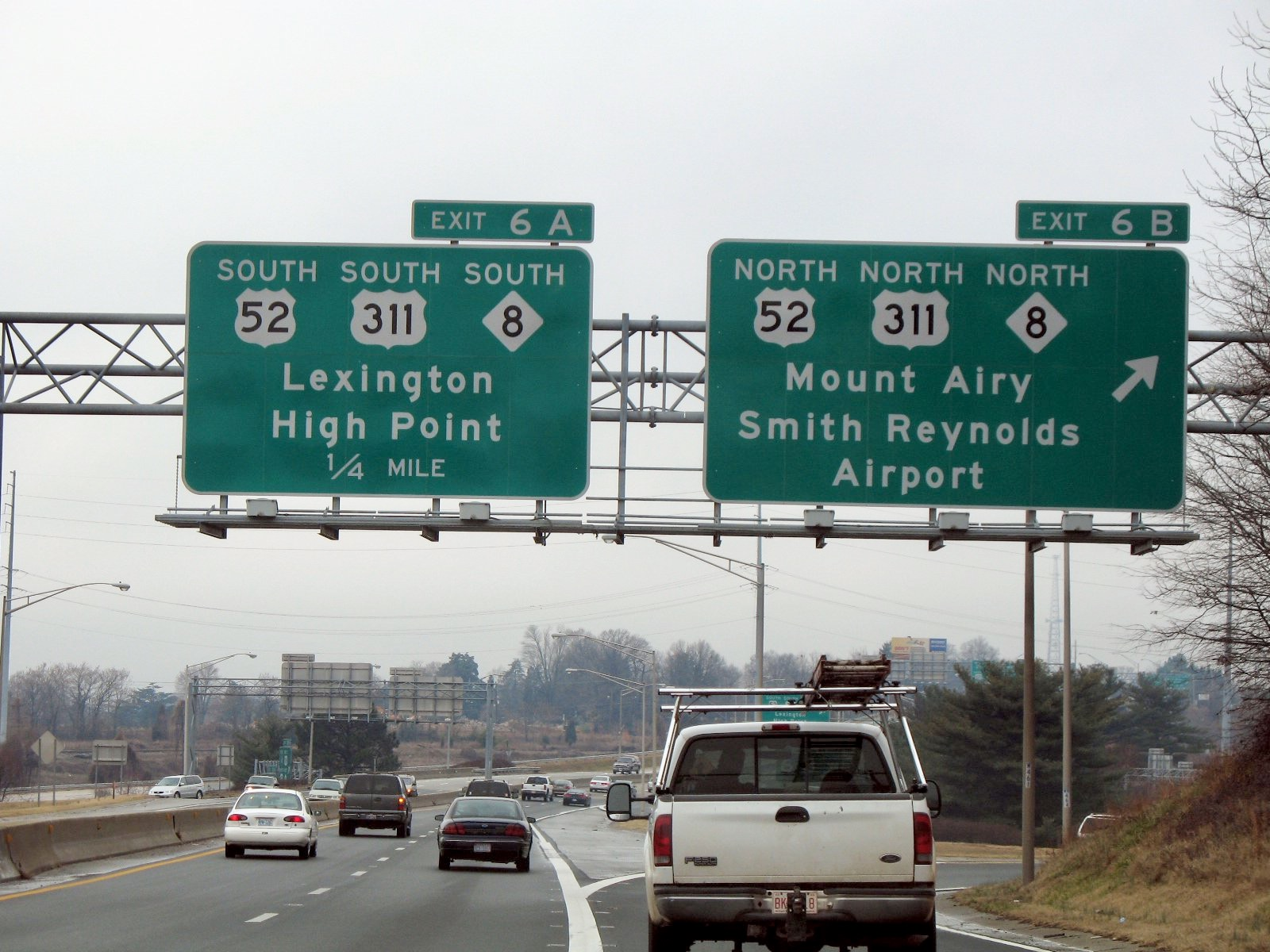
The north–south directions of US 52 in Winston-Salem

US 52 enters North Carolina just northwest of Mount Airy. It passes Pilot Mountain, one of the most distinctive natural features in North Carolina. Through the Piedmont Triad region, US 52 is mostly a controlled-access freeway. The route joins I-85 Business into Lexington and overlaps I-85 around Salisbury. The segment of US 52 from I-40 in Winston-Salem to Lexington has been upgraded to Interstate Highway standards; I-285 is co-signed along this segment. The segment from northern Winston-Salem to just south of Mount Airy is expected to form part of the I-74 corridor through North Carolina.

South of the Triad area, after splitting from I-85 in Salisbury, US 52 is typically a two-lane route linking some of the state's smaller cities and towns. Albemarle is the largest municipality along this segment of US 52 to the South Carolina state line.

=== South Carolina ===
US 52 enters South Carolina northeast of Cheraw. From Darlington southward it is a multilane highway and freeway, passing through Florence, Lake City, Kingstree, Moncks Corner and North Charleston before US 52's terminus at the intersection of Meeting and Line Streets in Charleston.

== History ==
Historically, US 52 was routed along University Avenue between Minneapolis and St. Paul. In the 1980s and 1990s, the highway was gradually shifted onto its present route along I-94. However, there was a gap in the definition of the highway for a few years until 1995. Since then, it has been routed along the Interstate between the Twin Cities, although as of 2007, there was still a sign on University Avenue entering Hennepin County telling motorists to follow County Highways 36 and 37 to reach US 52—which kept them on University, then on 4th St. for historic westbound US 52. Historic westbound US 52 then crossed the Central Avenue bridge (current Minnesota State Highway 65) and turned onto the current routing of County Highway 81 northwest to Osseo. It then followed the current route of US 169 north to Anoka.

In Rochester, Minnesota, US 52 was recently expanded to six lanes. Long-term plans have US 52 from St. Paul to I-90 becoming a freeway, and some have suggested that when the conversion is complete, the freeway should become a spur route for I-90. Currently, I-90 has no spur routes in Minnesota.

On April 10, 2015, a rockslide dropped a boulder the size of a house onto the westbound lanes of US 52 in Lawrence County just east of the bridge over the Ohio River to Ashland, Kentucky, leading to closures and detours while two days of cleanup took place.

=== U.S. Route 121 (1926) ===
Established in 1926, US 121 traversed from Lexington, North Carolina, to Max Meadows, Virginia, estimated to be 107 miles (172 km). In North Carolina it overlapped with NC 66; in Virginia it was overlapped with SR 15. In 1934, US 52 was extended southeast into Virginia and North Carolina, and replaced all of US 121.

== Future ==
=== Ohio ===
Long-term plans call for I-74 to be expanded eastward along the current US 52 corridor from its current eastern terminus of I-75 in Cincinnati to US 23, which has been proposed to be upgraded to Interstate Highway standards and be signed as I-73 in Portsmouth. Lack of sufficient funding has hindered construction upgrades for both freeways in Ohio.

== Major intersections ==
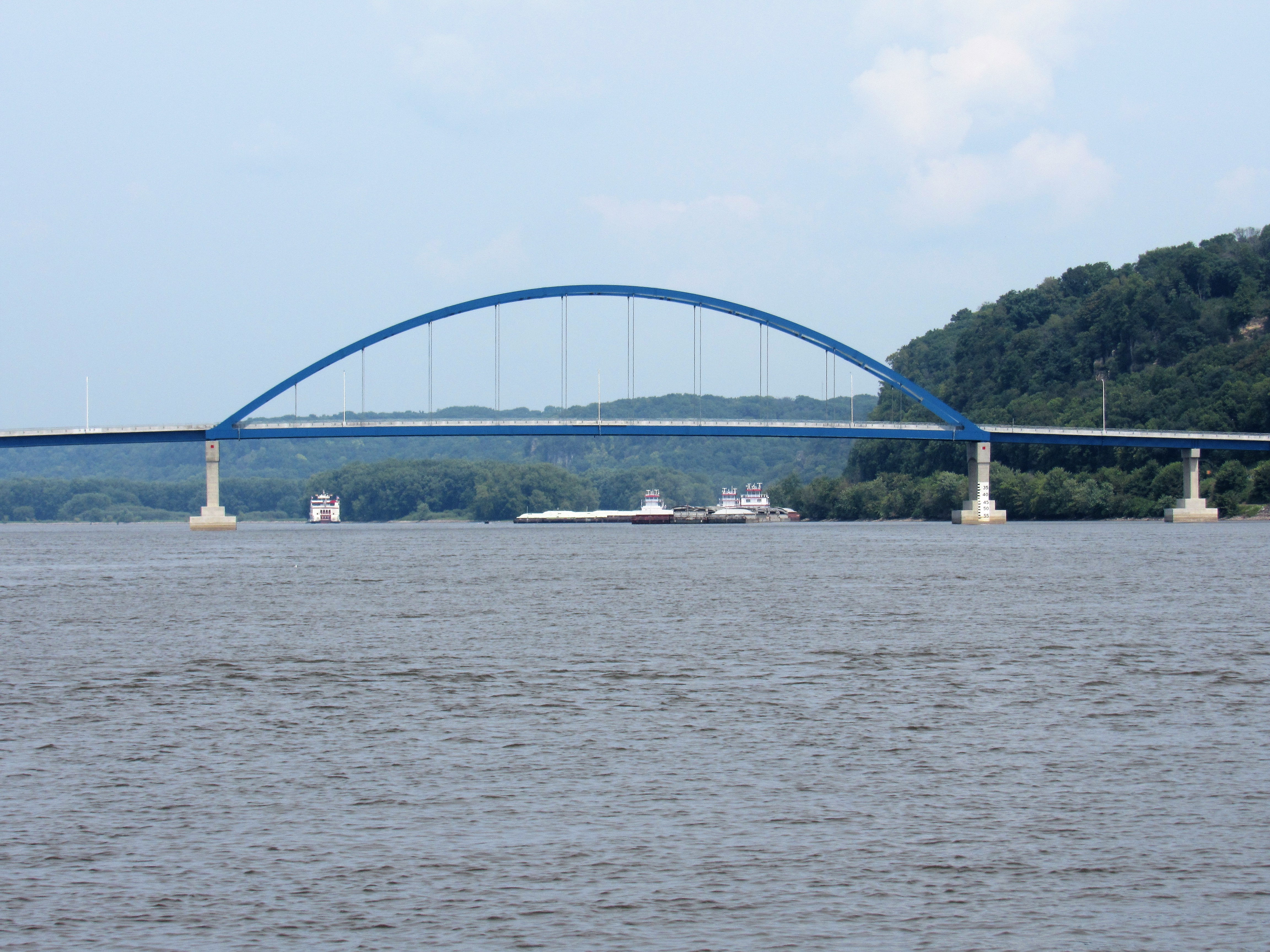
US 52 crosses the Mississippi River at Savanna, Illinois and Sabula, Iowa on the Dale Gardner Veterans Memorial Bridge.

North Dakota
Highway 39 at the Canadian border in Portal
US 2 northwest of Burlington. The highways travel concurrently to southeast of Minot.
US 83 in Minot
US 281 in Carrington. The highways travel concurrently to Jamestown.
I-94 in Jamestown. The highways travel concurrently to Saint Paul, Minnesota.
US 10 in West Fargo
I-29 / US 81 in Fargo
Minnesota
US 75 in Moorhead
US 59 in Fergus Falls Township. The highways travel concurrently to the Buse–Dane Prairie township line.
US 71 in Sauk Centre
I-494 / I-694 in Maple Grove. I-694/US 52 travels concurrently to Brooklyn Center.
US 169 on the Maple Grove–Brooklyn Park city line
I-394 / US 12 in Minneapolis. US 12/US 52 travels concurrently to St. Paul.
I-35W in Minneapolis. The highways travel concurrently, but on separate lanes, through the city.
I-35E in St. Paul. The highways travel concurrently, but on separate lanes, through the city.
I-35E / US 10 in St. Paul. US 10/US 52 travels concurrently through the city.
I-494 in Inver Grove Heights
US 63 in Rochester. The highways travel concurrently through the city.
US 14 in Rochester. The highways travel concurrently through the city.
I-90 in Marion Township
Iowa
US 18 in Post Township. The highways travel concurrently to Giard Township.
US 20 in Dyersville The highways travel concurrently to the Southwest Arterial in Dubuque.
US 61 / US 151 near Dubuque. The highways travel concurrently south of the city.
US 67 in Union Township
Illinois
US 30 on the Amboy–Franklin Grove township line
US 34 in Mendota
I-39 / US 51 on the Troy Grove–Ophir township line
I-55 in Shorewood
US 6 in Joliet. The highways travel concurrently through the city.
I-80 in Joliet
US 45 in Peotone Township. The highways travel concurrently to Ashkum Township.
I-57 in Kankakee
US 24 in Concord Township. The highways travel concurrently to Kentland, Indiana.
Indiana
US 24 / US 41 in Kentland. US 41/US 52 travels concurrently to Richland Township.
US 231 in Montmorenci. The highways travel concurrently to Wabash Township.
I-65 in Center Township. The highways travel concurrently to Eagle Township.
I-65 / I-865 in Eagle Township. I-865/US 52 travels concurrently through the township.
I-465 / I-865 in Eagle Township. I-465/US 52 travels concurrently to Indianapolis.
US 421 in Indianapolis. The highways travel concurrently through the city.
US 31 in Carmel. The highways travel concurrently to Indianapolis.
I-69 in Indianapolis. The highways travel concurrently through the city.
US 36 in Lawrence. The highways travel concurrently to Indianapolis.
I-70 in Indianapolis
US 40 in Indianapolis. The highways travel concurrently through the city.
I-465 / I-69 / US 31 / US 36 / US 40 / US 421 in Indianapolis
I-74 in Harrison Township. The highways travel concurrently to Cincinnati, Ohio.
Ohio
I-275 in Whitewater Township. The highways travel concurrently to Taylor Creek.
US 27 in Cincinnati. The highways travel concurrently through the city.
US 27 / US 127 in Cincinnati
I-74 / I-75 in Cincinnati. I-75/US 52 travels concurrently through the city.
US 27 in Cincinnati. The highways travel concurrently through the city.
US 27 / US 127 in Cincinnati. The highways travel concurrently through the city.
US 42 in Cincinnati. The highways travel concurrently through the city.
US 22 in Cincinnati
US 27 / US 50 in Cincinnati. US 27/US 52 travels concurrently through the city.
I-275 in Cincinnati. The highways travel concurrently to Anderson Township.
US 62 / US 68 in Ripley. US 52/US 62 travels concurrently to Aberdeen. US 52/US 68 travels concurrently to Huntington Township.
US 23 in Portsmouth
SR 823 in Sciotodale
West Virginia
US 60 in Huntington
I-64 in Huntington. The highways travel concurrently to Kenova.
US 119 northeast of Nolan. The highways travel concurrently to Williamson.
Kentucky
No major intersections
West Virginia
US 19 in Bluefield. The highways travel concurrently through the city.
US 460 in Bluefield. The highways travel concurrently through the city.
I-77 in Bluefield. The highways travel concurrently to north-northwest of Rocky Gap, Virginia.
Virginia
I-77 in Rocky Gap
I-77 west of Bland
I-81 / US 21 in Wytheville. I-81/US 52 travel concurrently to Fort Chiswell.
I-77 in Wytheville. The highways travel concurrently to Fort Chiswell.
US 11 in Wytheville. The highways travel concurrently to Fort Chiswell.
US 221 in Hillsville
US 58 in Hillsville
North Carolina
US 601 in Mount Airy
I-74 southeast of Mount Airy
Future I-74 in Winston-Salem
US 311 in Winston-Salem.
US 158 / US 421 in Winston-Salem
I-40 / I-285 in Winston-Salem. I-285/US 52 travel concurrently to Lexington.
US 64 in Lexington
US 29 / US 70 in Lexington. The highways travel concurrently to northeast of Spencer.
I-85 / I-285 in Lexington. I-85/US 52 travel concurrently to Salisbury.
US 74 in Wadesboro. The highways travel concurrently through the city.
South Carolina
US 1 in Cheraw. The highways travel concurrently to south-southwest of Cheraw.
US 15 / US 401 in Society Hill. US 15/US 52 travels concurrently to southwest of Society Hill. US 52/US 401 travels concurrently to Darlington.
I-95 northwest of Florence
US 76 in Florence
US 301 in Florence. The highways travel concurrently to Effingham.
US 378 north of Lake City
US 521 east of Greeleyville
US 176 in Goose Creek
US 78 in North Charleston. The highways travel concurrently through the city.
I-26 in North Charleston
I-526 in North Charleston
I-26 in Charleston
I-26 / US 17 in Charleston
Line Street/Meeting Street in Charleston

== See also ==
- Interstate 74

=== Related routes ===
- U.S. Route 152
- West Virginia Route 152

=== Special and suffixed routes ===
- U.S. Route 52 Spur in Charleston, South Carolina
