= Haldan =

Haldan may refer to:

== People ==
- Haldan Keffer Hartline, an American physiologist,
- Paul Haldan, a Romanian-born Dutch professional table tennis player.
- Halfdan, a legendary Swedish or Danish king

== See also ==
- Haldane (disambiguation)
