= A. R. B. Haldane =

Scottish social historian and writer

Archibald Richard Burdon Haldane CBE (18 November 1900 – 18 October 1982) was a Scottish social historian and writer.

He was the son of Edith (née Nelson) and Sir William Haldane, grandson of James Alexander Haldane, and nephew of Richard Burdon Haldane, 1st Viscount Haldane. His brother was Graeme Haldane and he married Janet Macrae Simpson-Smith.

Like his father and uncles, he attended the Edinburgh Academy, after which he went up to Balliol College, Oxford to read history. He returned to Scotland to enter his father's legal firm and acted for a time as Fiscal to the Society of Writers to the Signet. He then became involved in the Savings Bank movement and was at one stage vice-chairman of the Savings Bank Association. In 1968, he was appointed a CBE in recognition of his work for the bank.

He was principally known, however, as a social historian and author, and for his seminal work on the drovers' roads of Scotland. In recognition for his work in this field, he was awarded the honorary degree of D Litt from the University of Edinburgh in 1952. He published two further books in this field, New Ways through the Glens and Three centuries of Scottish posts, as well as several on his favourite pastime of trout fishing, of which he was passionately fond.

== Selected bibliography ==
- By Many Waters: A Record of Fishing and Walking - 1940
- The Path by the Water - 1944
- The Drove Roads of Scotland - 1952
- New Ways Through the Glens: Highland Road, Bridge and Canal Makers of the Early 19th Century - 1962
- Three Centuries of Scottish Posts: an Historical Survey to 1836 - 1971
- By River, Stream and Loch: Thirty Years with a Trout Rod - 1973
- Great Fishmonger of the Tay: John Richardson of Perth and Pitfour, 1760-1821 - 1981

== Sources ==
- 175 Accies by Bill Stirling, 1999 (collection of biographical sketches of 175 selected pupils of Edinburgh Academy)
