= Illinois Route 64 =

State highway in northern Illinois, US

Illinois Route 64
- Illinois Route 64 highlighted in red IL 64 Truck highlighted in blue

Route information
- Maintained by IDOT and CDOT
- Length: 138.61 mi (223.07 km)
- Existed: 1924–present

Major junctions
- West end: US 52 / Iowa 64 in Savanna
- US 52 near Lanark; I-39 / US 51 in Lindenwood; I-355 Toll in Glendale Heights; I-290 / US 20 in Elmhurst; I-294 Toll in Elmhurst; US 20 in Elmhurst; US 12 / US 45 in Northlake; I-90 / I-94 in Chicago
- East end: US 41 in Chicago

Location
- Country: United States
- State: Illinois
- Counties: Carroll, Ogle, DeKalb, Kane, DuPage, Cook

Highway system
- Illinois State Highway System; Interstate; US; State; Tollways; Scenic
← I-64	→ IL 65

Illinois Route 64 (IL 64, Illinois 64) is an east–west state highway in Northern Illinois. Its western terminus is at the Iowa state line, connecting with U.S. Route 52 (US 52) and Iowa Highway 64 via the Dale Gardner Veterans Memorial Bridge at the Mississippi River west of Savanna. IL 64 then travels east through Mount Carroll, Lanark, Mount Morris, Oregon, Sycamore, Lily Lake, St. Charles and the western suburbs of Chicago before terminating at U.S. Route 41 (US 41, Lake Shore Drive) on the city's north side. IL 64 is 138.61 miles (223.07 km) long.

== Route description ==
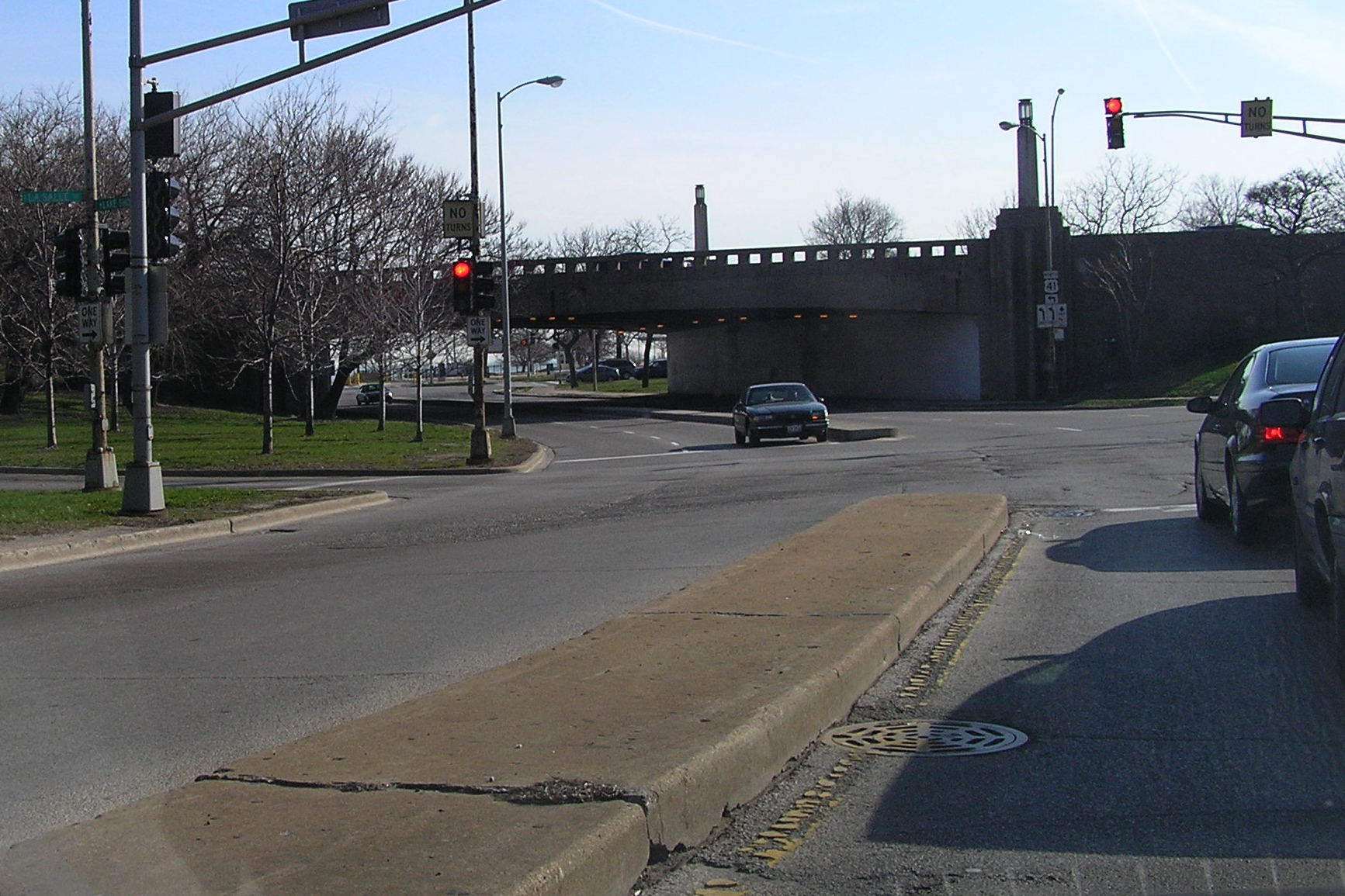
Eastbound endpoint of IL 64 at US 41

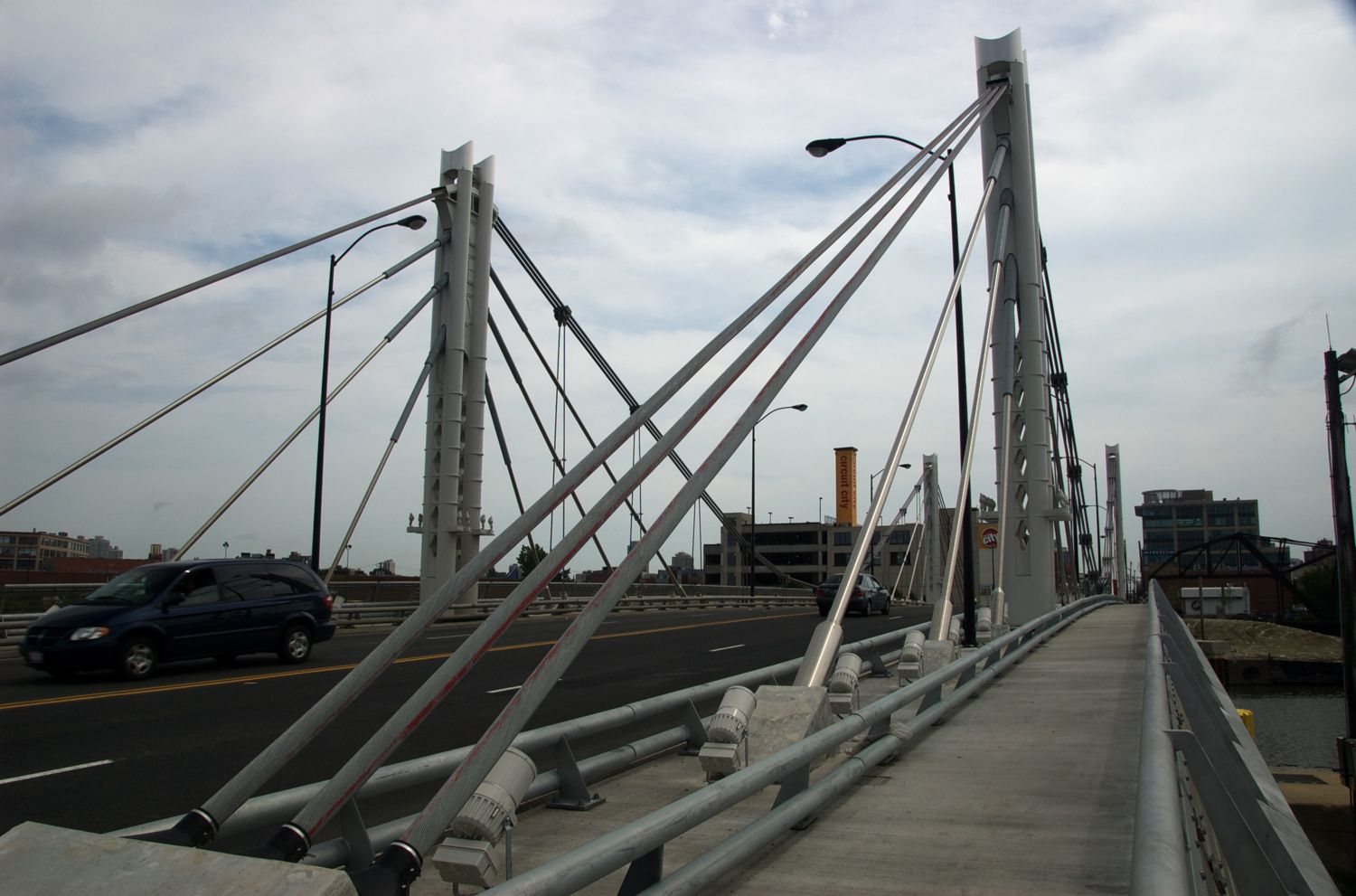
North Avenue Bridge over the Chicago River, looking east

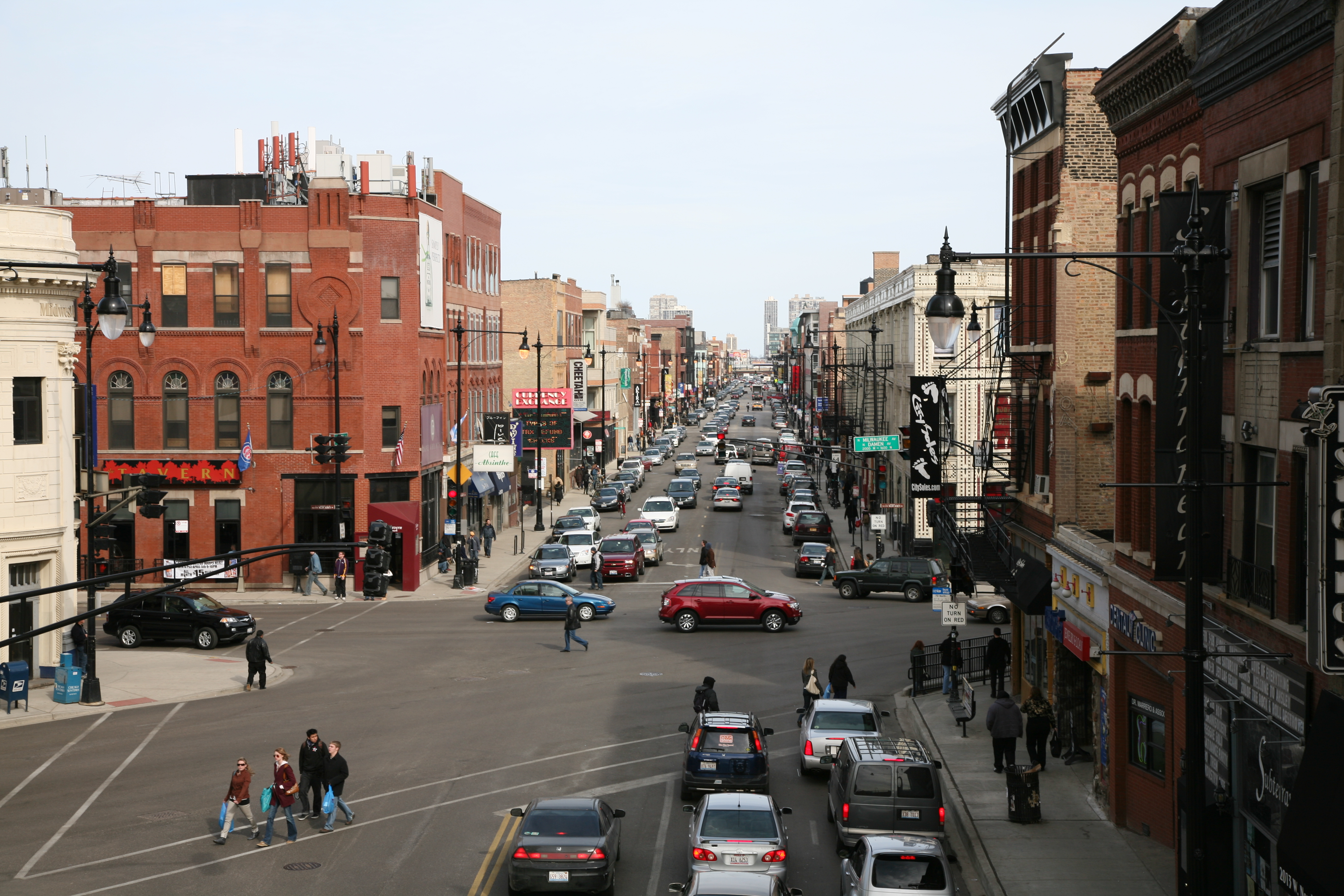
Looking east down North Ave. from CTA Damen Blue Line station

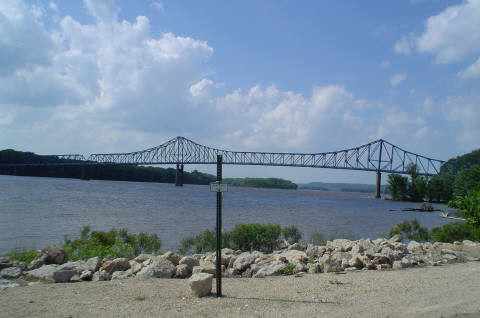
The Savanna-Sabula Bridge near Savanna was the western terminus of IL 64 until 2017, when it was replaced by the Dale Gardner Veterans Memorial Bridge.

IL 64 overlaps US 52 between the Iowa state line and Brookville—a distance of over 20 miles (32 km)—so that the IL 64 designation can continue to the Iowa border. East of the Mississippi River, IL 64 is largely a rural, undivided surface road from Savanna to the Fox River in Saint Charles.

At St. Charles, IL 64 enters the Chicago metro area and becomes a four-lane road, taking on the name of Main Street. Just east of St. Charles, IL 64 becomes North Avenue and retains this designation until just before its terminus in Chicago at US 41 (Lake Shore Drive). At IL 59, the road widens further from four to six lanes and becomes a divided highway until its intersection with IL 83 in Elmhurst. From Elmhurst to Interstate 294 (I-294) it remains a four-lane surface street, but it widens to a six-lane divided highway once again through the towns of Stone Park and Northlake. At the Des Plaines River and IL 43, North Avenue becomes four lanes until it reaches North Western Avenue. At this point, it becomes at times a two-lane road, for the rest of its route through Chicago. One-half mile (0.8 km) west of US 41, IL 64 turns north onto LaSalle Boulevard, and then east, before terminating at Lake Shore Drive.

North Avenue is a main east–west artery in Chicago itself, and one of only seven state routes to enter the city. It is located at the 1600 North parallel of Chicago. Just east of the Kennedy Expressway (I-90/I-94), the North Avenue Bridge carries IL 64 over the North Branch of the Chicago River. The hybrid suspension/cable-stayed bridge was built in 2006, replacing a bascule bridge dating back to 1907.

Between Halsted Street and Sheffield Avenue, North Avenue has become a shopping destination, known as the Clybourn Corridor.

== History ==
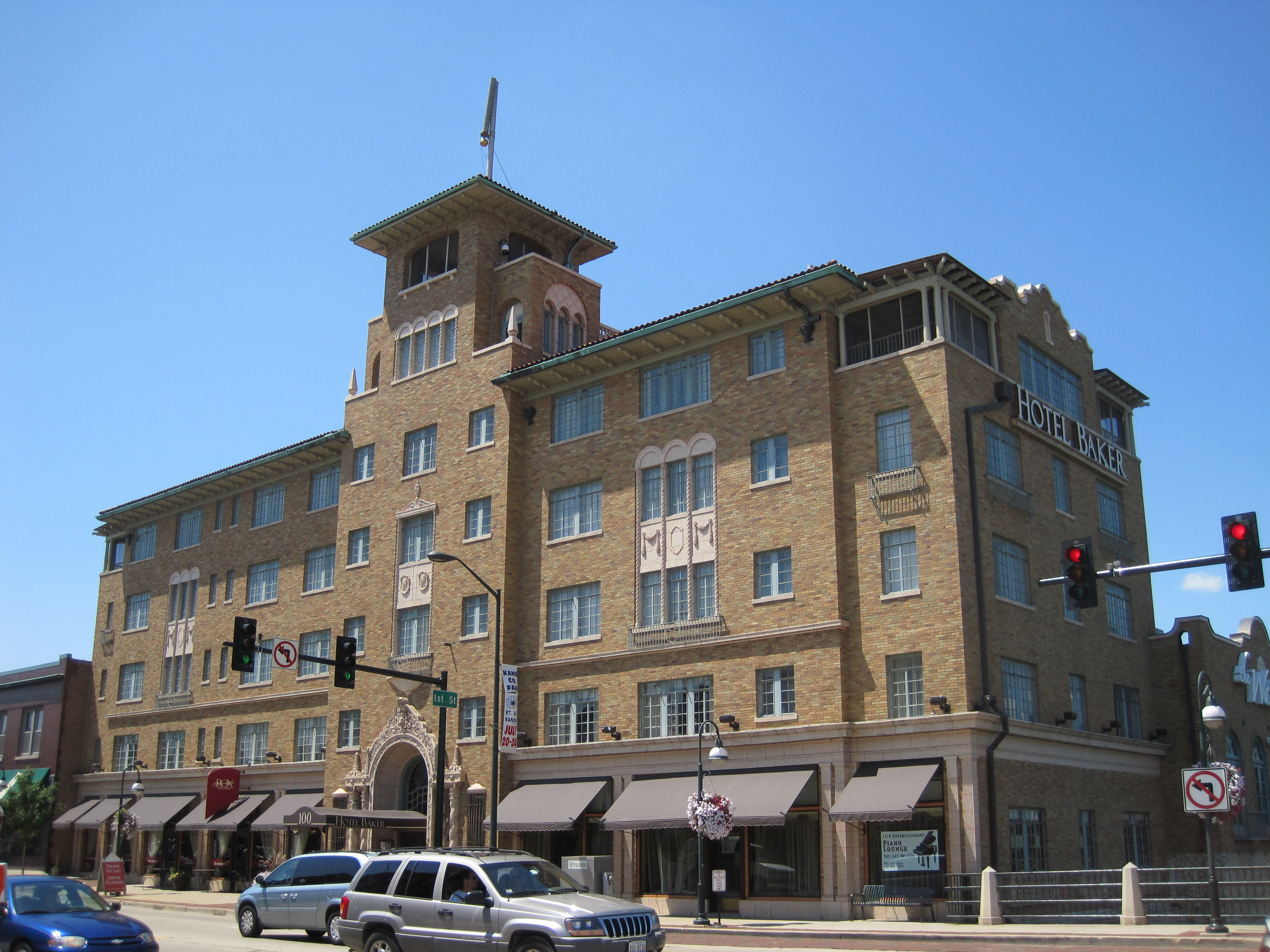
Illinois Route 64 in downtown St. Charles

State Bond Initiative Route 64 was IL 64 from Sycamore to Chicago. The portion of the road in DuPage County was put through in 1928, the first 40-foot (12 m) highway through the county. In 1937, the road was extended west from Sycamore to what was then US 51 (and is now IL 251). Afterwards, it was extended further west to US 52, and then following it to the state line. Much like IL 92, there is no particular reason for extending IL 64 through Iowa and Nebraska, as existing U.S. Routes served any major cities on the State Route 64s better.

== Major junctions ==
County	Location	mi	km	Destinations	Notes
Jackson	Union Township			US 52 north / Iowa 64 west	Continuation in Iowa
Mississippi River		0.00	0.00	Dale Gardner Veterans Memorial Bridge	
Carroll	Savanna	0.13	0.21	IL 84 north (Main Street) / Great River Road north (National Route) – Galena	West ends of IL 84 and Great River Road overlaps
Carroll	Savanna	2.19	3.52	IL 84 south (Valduct Road) / Great River Road south (National Route) – East Moline	East ends of IL 84 and Great River Road overlaps
Carroll	Mount Carroll	11.09	17.85	IL 78 (Clay Street) to IL 40 – Morrison	
Carroll	Lanark	18.69	30.08	IL 73 north (Broad Street) – Pearl City, Lena	
Carroll	Rock Creek–Lima Township	28.62	46.06	US 52 east – Dixon	Eastern end of US 52 overlap
Ogle	Lincoln Township	33.70	54.23	IL 26 north – Freeport	Northern end of IL 26 overlap
Ogle	Lincoln Township	34.21	55.06	IL 26 south	Southern end of IL 26 overlap
Ogle	Oregon	48.31	77.75	IL 2 (4th Street) – Rockford, Dixon	
Ogle	White Rock Township	62.26	100.20	IL 251 – Rockford, Rochelle	
Ogle	Lynnville Township	64.57	103.92	I-39 / US 51 – Rockford, LaSalle–Peru	I-39 exit 104
DeKalb	Sycamore	81.61	131.34	IL 23 south (Cross Street) – DeKalb	Western end of IL 23 overlap
DeKalb	Sycamore	82.13	132.18	IL 23 north (Main Street) – Genoa	Eastern end of IL 23 overlap
Kane	Lily Lake	90.90	146.29	IL 47 – Pingree Grove, Elburn	
Kane	St. Charles	100.07	161.05	IL 31 (Second Street) – Elgin, Geneva	
Kane	St. Charles	100.36	161.51	IL 25 (5th Avenue)	
DuPage	West Chicago	105.66	170.04	IL 59 (Neltnor Boulevard)	
DuPage	Lombard	114.56	184.37	I-355 Toll (Veterans Memorial Tollway) – Joliet, Northwest Suburbs	Toll barriers on southbound entrance and northbound exit ramps; I-355 exit 27
DuPage	Lombard	114.85	184.83	IL 53 (Rohlwing Road)	
DuPage	Elmhurst	118.33	190.43	IL 64 Truck east / IL 83 (Kingery Highway)	
DuPage–Cook county line	Elmhurst	120.31– 120.66	193.62– 194.18	I-290 east to I-294 Toll south – Chicago	I-290 exit 13B
DuPage–Cook county line	Elmhurst	120.31– 120.66	193.62– 194.18	I-290 west / US 20 west / IL 64 Truck west – Rockford	I-290 exit 13A; westbound exit and eastbound entrance
DuPage–Cook county line	Elmhurst	120.31– 120.66	193.62– 194.18	US 20 east (Lake Street) I-294 Toll north (Tri-State Tollway) – Milwaukee	I-294 exit 33; westbound access to I-294 north via Railroad Avenue
Cook	Northlake	122.33– 122.77	196.87– 197.58	US 12 / US 45 (Mannheim Road)	Interchange
Cook	Melrose Park	125.03	201.22	IL 171 (1st Avenue)	
Cook	Chicago	126.54	203.65	IL 43 (Harlem Avenue)	
Cook	Chicago	129.62	208.60	IL 50 (Cicero Avenue)	
Cook	Chicago	133.80	215.33	I-90 / I-94 (Kennedy Expressway)	I-94 exit 48B
Cook	Chicago	135.94	218.77	US 41 / LMCT (Lake Shore Drive)	Interchange
Cook	Chicago	135.99	218.85	Roundabout on shore of Lake Michigan	
1.000 mi = 1.609 km; 1.000 km = 0.621 mi: Concurrency terminus; Electronic toll collection; Incomplete access

== Truck route ==
Illinois Route 64 Truck
- Location: Elmhurst

IL 64 has one alternate route; Illinois Route 64 Truck (IL 64 Truck), a bypass around a truck-prohibited, residential section of Elmhurst. Eastbound truck traffic is rerouted north along IL 83, east along US 20 (Lake Street) and then onto I-290 before being allowed to return to IL 64. Westbound truck traffic follows the same route in reverse.

As early as 1989, the City of Elmhurst had sought to block trucks from traveling on North Avenue through its city limits. For a time, Illinois House of Representatives minority leader Lee Daniels supported a plan to reduce North Avenue from four lanes to two, prohibiting trucks from traveling through the residential neighborhood. By 1994, the village had agreed to reconstruct North Avenue and add a single set of left-turn lanes at Myrtle Avenue. Reconstruction of North Avenue in Elmhurst took place in 1997.
