= Dale Gardner =

American astronaut (1948–2014)

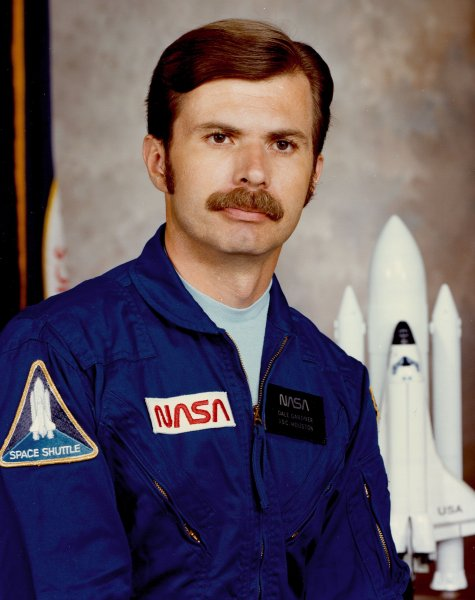
- Born: Dale Allan Gardner; November 8, 1948; Fairmont, Minnesota, U.S.
- Died: February 19, 2014 (aged 65); Colorado Springs, Colorado, U.S.
- Education: University of Illinois, Urbana-Champaign (BS)
- Awards: Defense Superior Service Medal (3); NASA Space Flight Medal (2); Distinguished Flying Cross; Meritorious Unit Commendation; Humanitarian Service Medal; Sea Service Deployment Ribbon; Master Space Badge; Lloyd's Medal
- Space career

NASA astronaut
- Rank: Captain, USN
- Time in space: 14d 0h 52m
- Selection: NASA Group 8 (1978)
- Total EVAs: 2
- Total EVA time: 12h 14m
- Mission: STS-8; STS-51-A
- Retired: October 1986

Dale Allan Gardner (November 8, 1948 – February 19, 2014) was a NASA astronaut, and naval flight officer who flew two Space Shuttle missions during the mid 1980s.

== Personal information ==
Born on November 8, 1948, in Fairmont, Minnesota, Gardner grew up in Sherburn, Minnesota, and Savanna, Illinois. An avid sports enthusiast, he enjoyed snow skiing, golfing, tennis, woodworking and photography. Gardner is survived by his daughter, Lisa Gardner, and his granddaughter, Isabella Hoefler.

== Education ==
Gardner graduated as valedictorian of his class from Savanna Community High School, in Savanna, Illinois, in 1966. He received a Bachelor of Science degree in Engineering Physics from the University of Illinois at Urbana-Champaign in 1970.

== Military experience ==
Upon graduation from the University of Illinois in 1970, Gardner entered into active duty with the United States Navy and was assigned to the Aviation Officer Candidate School at Pensacola, Florida. He was commissioned an ensign and was selected as the most promising naval officer from his class. In October 1970 he began Basic Naval Flight Officer training with the VT-10 squadron at Pensacola, graduating with the highest academic average ever achieved in the history of the squadron. He proceeded to the Naval Air Technical Training Center at NAS Glynco, Georgia, for Advanced Naval Flight Officer training and was selected a Distinguished Naval Graduate and awarded his Naval Flight Officer wings on May 5, 1971. At the Naval Air Test Center at NAS Patuxent River, Maryland, from May 1971 to July 1973, he was assigned to the Weapons Systems Test Division and involved in initial F-14 Tomcat developmental test and evaluation as Project Officer for Inertial Navigation and Avionics Systems. Gardner's next assignment was with the first operational F-14 squadron (VF-1) at Naval Air Station Miramar, California, from where he flew in the Tomcat and participated in two Western Pacific and Indian Ocean cruises while deployed aboard the aircraft carrier USS Enterprise. From December 1976 until July 1978, he was assigned to Test and Evaluation Squadron 4 (VX-4) aboard NAS Point Mugu, California, involved in the operational test and evaluation of Navy fighter aircraft.

== NASA experience ==
Gardner was selected as an astronaut candidate by NASA in January 1978, reporting to the Johnson Space Center in July 1978. In August 1979 he completed a one-year training and evaluation period, making him eligible for assignment as a Mission Specialist Astronaut. He subsequently served as the Astronaut Project Manager for the flight software in the Space Shuttle onboard computers leading up to the first flight in April 1981. He then served as a Support Crew Astronaut for the fourth flight (STS-4). He flew as a mission specialist on STS-8 (August 30 to September 5, 1983) and STS-51-A (November 8–16, 1984). Gardner logged a total of 337 hours in space and 225 orbits of the Earth on these two flights.

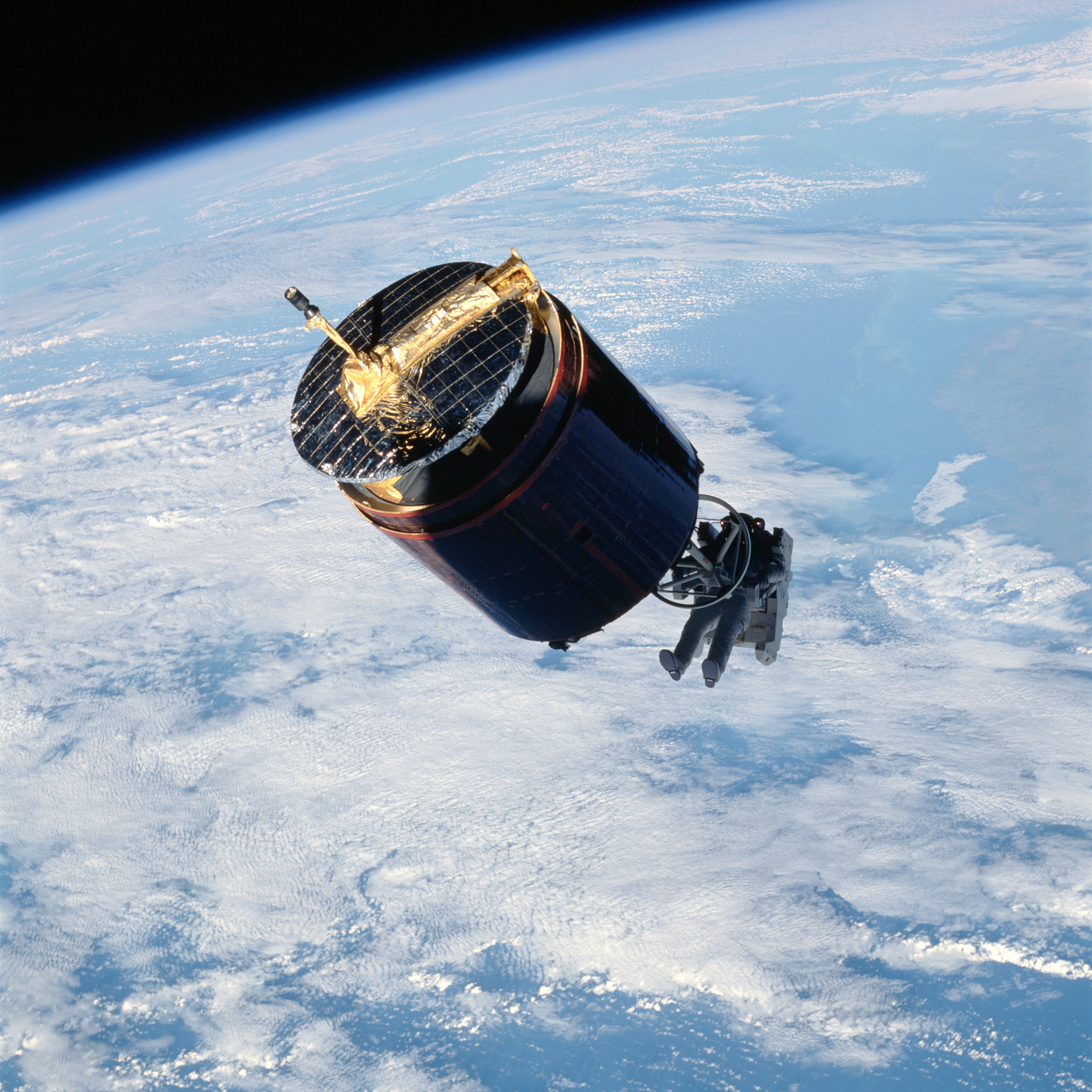
View of Dale Gardner, completely untethered from the shuttle, retrieves an errant Westar 6 satellite during STS-51-A

He logged more than 2,300 hours flying time in over 20 different types of aircraft and spacecraft. Prior to the Challenger accident, Gardner was chosen to be a member of the first Shuttle mission to launch from Vandenberg Air Force Base, California. That flight and the Vandenberg launch capability itself were canceled after the accident.

In October 1986, following 8½ years with NASA, Gardner returned to his Navy duties and was assigned to the U.S. Space Command, Colorado Springs, Colorado. He served over two years as the Deputy Chief, Space Control Operations Division in Cheyenne Mountain Air Force Station and, after promotion to the rank of captain in June 1989, became the Command's Deputy Director for Space Control at Peterson Air Force Base. His space control responsibilities included the surveillance and tracking of all man-made objects in Earth orbit and the protection of U.S. and allied space systems. Gardner retired from the U.S. Navy in October 1990 and accepted a position with TRW Inc. in Colorado Springs, being placed as a program manager in the Colorado Springs Engineering Operations of TRW's Space and Defense Sector. In that capacity, he was involved in the development of both civilian and military space and defense high technology programs. After TRW, he became the manager of Northrop Grumman's operations in Colorado Springs. Gardner became the Associate Director for Renewable Fuels Science and Technology at the National Renewable Energy Laboratory in 2003, and retired in January 2013.

=== Space flight experience ===
STS-8 launched from the Kennedy Space Center, Florida on August 30, 1983. The crew aboard Space Shuttle Challenger included Richard Truly (Spacecraft Commander), Daniel Brandenstein (Pilot), and fellow Mission Specialists Guion Bluford and William Thornton. This was the third flight of the Orbiter Challenger and the first night launch and landing mission of the Shuttle program. During the flight, the crew of STS-8 deployed the Indian National Satellite (INSAT-1B), operated and tested the Canadian-built Remote Manipulator System (RMS) robot arm, and performed numerous earth resources and space science experiments. STS-8 completed 98 Earth orbits in 145 hours before landing at Edwards Air Force Base, California on September 5, 1983.

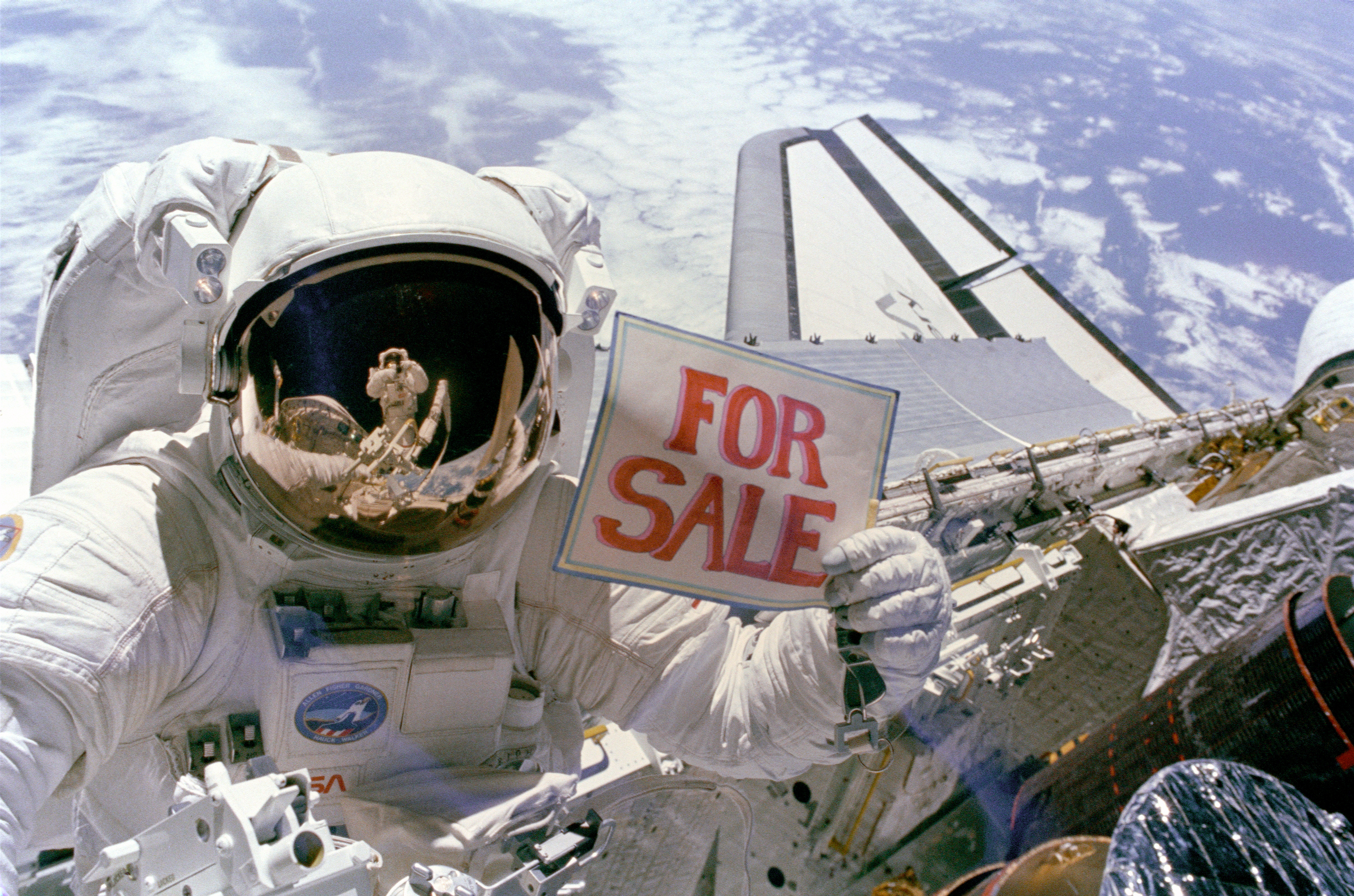
Gardner holds up a "For Sale" sign after Palapa B-2 and WESTAR VI were recovered

STS-51-A, the fourteenth flight of the Shuttle program, launched on November 8, 1984 (his birthday). The crew aboard Space Shuttle Discovery included Frederick Hauck (Spacecraft Commander), David Walker (Pilot), and fellow Mission Specialists Joseph Allen and Anna Fisher. This was the second flight of Discovery. During this mission the crew deployed two satellites, Canada's Anik D-2 (TELESAT-H) and the Hughes' LEASAT-1 (Syncom IV-1), now in service with the U.S. Navy. In an unprecedented salvage effort, they rendezvoused with and returned from space two satellites previously launched into improper orbits, the Indonesian Palapa B-2 and the Western Union Westar VI communication satellites. Gardner and Allen used the Manned Maneuvering Unit (MMU) backpack to travel through space, completely untethered from the shuttle, for a total of 12 hours flight time. It was the first and only untethered spacewalk for returning malfunctioning satellites from orbit. The feat is exceptional: the MMU has been retired, modern astronauts rely on tethered spacewalks, and safer robotic solutions are already being developed.

== Organizations ==
Gardner was a Member of Phi Eta Sigma, Sigma Tau, and Tau Beta Pi, and a fellow of the American Astronautical Society.

== Special honors ==
Gardner was awarded the Defense Superior Service Medal (1984, 1989, 1990); the Distinguished Flying Cross (1989); the Meritorious Unit Commendation (1976); the Humanitarian Service Medal (1979) and the Sea Service Deployment Ribbon (1984). His other honors included the NASA Space Flight Medal (1983 and 1984); the Master Space Badge (1989); and the Lloyd's of London Meritorious Service Medal (1984).

A bridge connecting Savanna, Illinois & Sabula, Iowa over the Mississippi River was built through interstate collaboration in dedication to Dale Gardner and US Veterans in November 2017 as the Dale Gardner Veterans Memorial Bridge. This new $80.6 million bridge was constructed as a replacement to the 86 year old Savanna-Sabula Bridge.

== Death ==
Gardner died on February 19, 2014, after suffering a hemorrhagic stroke at his home. He was 65.
