= Dale Gardner Veterans Memorial Bridge =

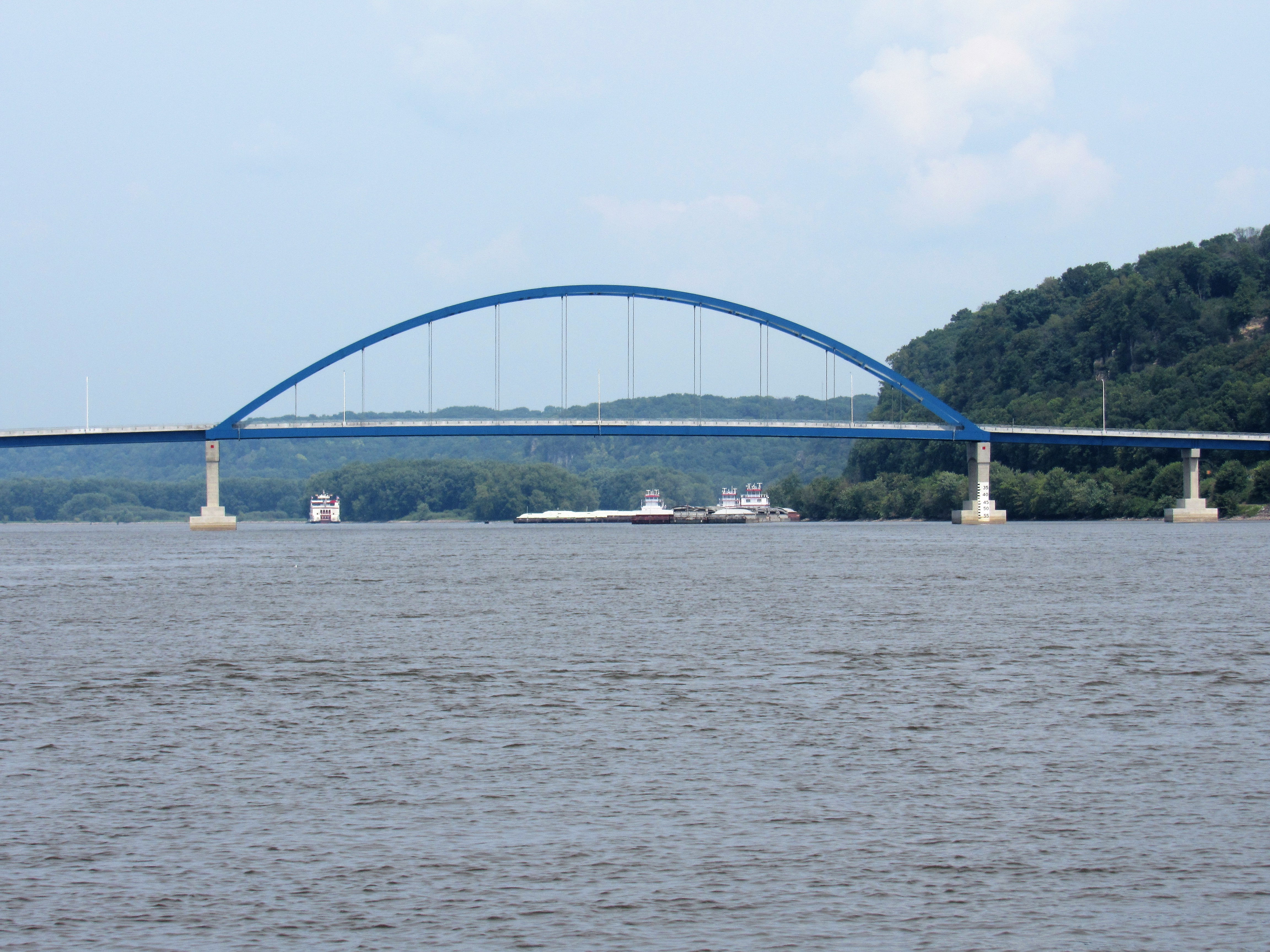
- Coordinates: 42°06′16″N 90°09′38″W
- Carries: 2 lanes of US 52 / Iowa 64 / IL 64
- Crosses: Mississippi River, BNSF Railway
- Locale: Savanna, Illinois / Jackson County, near Sabula, Iowa, River Mile 537.8
- Official name: Dale Gardner Veterans Memorial Bridge
- Other name(s): Savanna-Sabula Bridge
- Named for: Dale Gardner
- Maintained by: Illinois Department of Transportation

Characteristics
- Design: steel tied-arch
- Total length: 2,454 ft (748 m)
- Width: 40 ft (12 m)
- Longest span: 546 ft (166 m)
- No. of spans: 12
- Clearance below: 65 ft (20 m)
- No. of lanes: 2

History
- Constructed by: Kraemer North America, Bumpy's Steel Erection
- Construction start: 2016
- Construction cost: $80 Million
- Opened: November 17, 2017
- Replaces: Savanna-Sabula Bridge

The Dale Gardner Veterans Memorial Bridge, often referred to as the New Savanna-Sabula Bridge, or by the same name as its predecessor, the Savanna-Sabula Bridge, is a steel tied-arch that carries U.S. Route 52 (US 52) across the Mississippi River. It connects the city of Savanna, Illinois, with the island city of Sabula, Iowa. Construction on the span began in 2016 and it opened on November 17, 2017. It was erected by Bumpy's Steel Erection of East St. Louis, Illinois and Edward Kraemer & Sons of Plain, Wisconsin. The bridge replaced the Savanna–Sabula Bridge, which was located a few yards to the north.

The Dale Gardner Veterans Memorial Bridge was closed on February 27, 2018 while an adjoining causeway was replaced. The Running Slough Bridge had sunk between 1 foot (30 cm) and 5 feet (1.5 m) causing a visible change to the structure. The causeway bridge was deemed unsafe until the replacement was complete. The closure necessitated a 36-mile (58 km) detour to Clinton, Iowa/Fulton, Illinois. A complimentary ferry service between Savanna and Sabula began operations on June 12. The bridge was re-opened on August 31, 2018.

== See also ==
- List of crossings of the Upper Mississippi River
