= North Avenue Bridge =

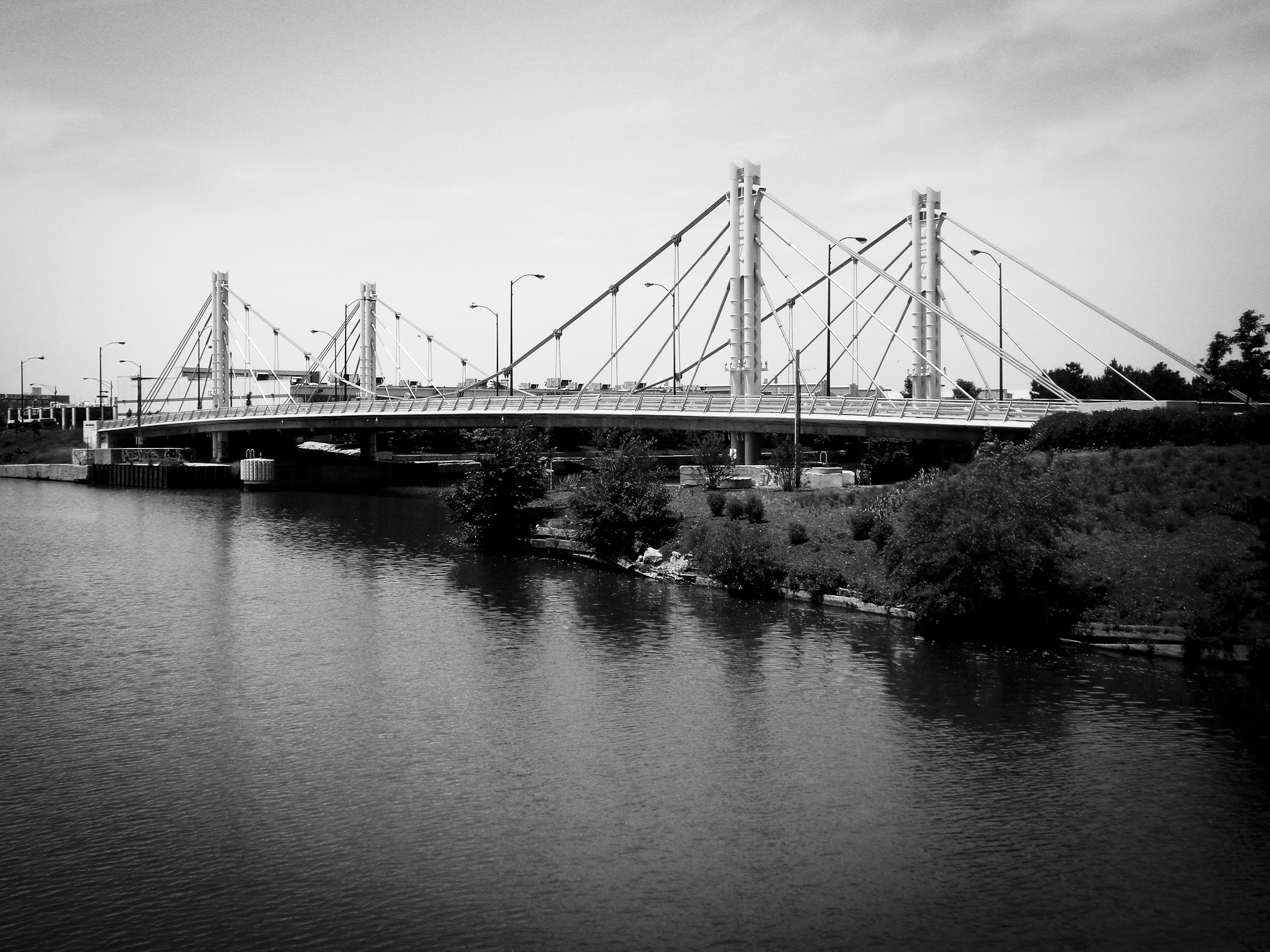
- North Avenue Bridge from Goose Island
- Coordinates: 41.9108°N 87.6569°W
- Carries: 4 lanes of North Avenue ( IL 64), 2 sidewalks
- Crosses: North Branch of the Chicago River
- Locale: Chicago, Illinois
- Official name: North Avenue Bridge

Characteristics
- Design: Hybrid suspension/cable-stayed
- Total length: 420 ft (128 m)
- Width: 78.5 ft (23.9 m)
- Height: 50 ft (15 m)
- Longest span: 252 ft (77 m)
- Clearance below: 18 ft (5 m)

History
- Construction start: Mid-June, 2006
- Construction end: May 23, 2008
- Opened: May 23, 2008

Statistics
- Daily traffic: 40,000

Location
- Interactive map of North Avenue Bridge

The North Avenue Bridge can refer to one of three bridges that has carried North Avenue (Illinois Route 64) over the North Branch of the Chicago River on the north side of Chicago, Illinois. A center-pier swing bridge built in 1877 was replaced in 1907 by a bascule bridge, allowing river traffic more room for maneuvering in and out of the North Canal, just north of Goose Island.

Due to deteriorating conditions and inadequate capacity, the bascule bridge was demolished in 2006 to make room for a hybrid suspension/cable-stayed bridge. The suspension/cable-stayed bridge fully opened on May 23, 2008.

== History ==
As Chicago grew into a center of industry and commerce in the late 19th century, numerous fixed-span crossings were replaced by center-pier swing bridges, the most common type of bridge that allowed pedestrians and wagons to cross the Chicago River while also periodically allowing ship traffic below. In 1877, one of these bridges was constructed just north of Goose Island.

=== Development of the bascule bridge ===
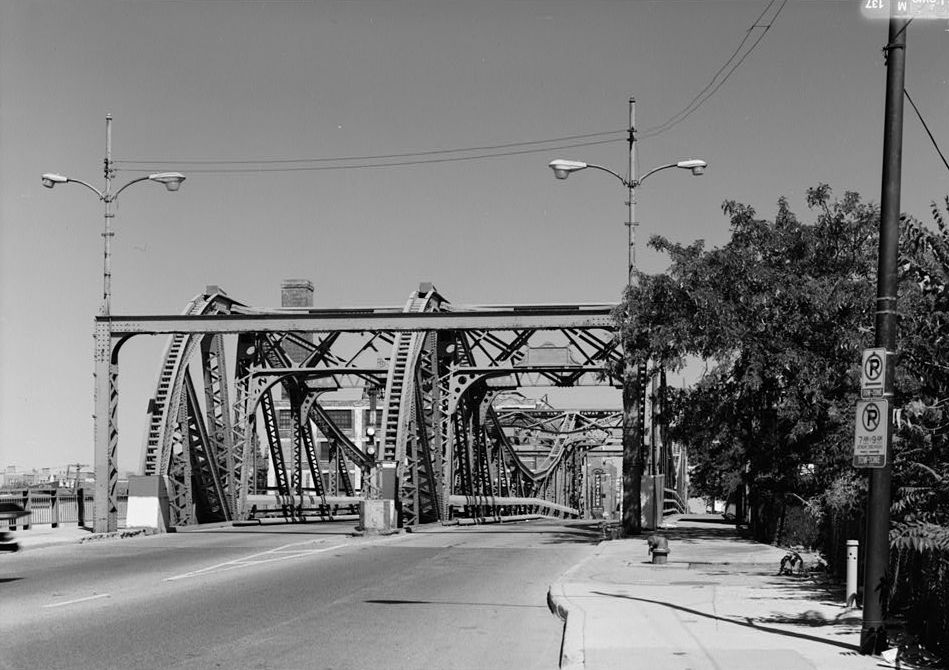
Western portal of the North Avenue Bridge constructed in 1907

The 1877 bridge and its counterparts, while the most common bridge of the mid-19th century, were criticized by both the shipping and real estate industries of Chicago. As the 19th century came to a close, shipping vessels had grown larger, and the swing bridges' center piers had become navigational hazards. In addition, each swing span required a large clearance around the bridge, preventing the development of docking facilities near the bridge. As open land along the Chicago River grew scarce, real estate and shipping companies grew increasingly critical of the swing spans.

No progress was made on the issue until 1890, when the United States Congress gave the United States War Department the authorization to build new bridges over waterways, and to force changes to existing bridges that posed a hazard to navigation. In 1892, the directive was enforced in Chicago when a just-completed bridge at Canal Avenue was ordered removed by the U.S. Army Corps of Engineers. That year, the city's engineers began to study suitable alternatives to the hazardous swing-span bridge.

The search generated disagreement between the Scherzer Rolling Lift Company of Chicago and Chicago Department of Public Works City Engineer John E. Ericson. Although the rolling lift bridge (a type of bascule bridge) was mechanically the most simple alternative, engineers soon discovered that the span applied its load in a rolling motion on its foundation, crumbling poorly built foundations. Ericson directed his staff to investigate other bridges in the U.S. and Europe, eventually finding that the Tower Bridge (1894) would be an appropriate starting point.

With a model bridge that was patent-free, had a fixed center of gravity and simple mechanical motion, in 1900 Ericson prompted the Chicago City Council to allocate funding to replace five deteriorating swing-span bridges. The first five bridges were built at Clybourn Place (later Cortland Avenue) in 1902, Division Street over both the North Branch Canal (1903) and the Chicago River (1904), 95th Street over the Calumet River (1903) and at Western Avenue over the North Branch Canal (1904). During the same period of time, the Scherzer Company built seven of their rolling lift bridges over the Chicago Sanitary and Ship Canal, which was widened to accommodate larger flows from the recently reversed Chicago River. These bridges, built under the authority of the Chicago Sanitary District, only needed to be approved by the Corps of Engineers, not the Department of Public Works.

By 1904, the city had obtained permission to issue bonds to replace the rest of the swing bridges on the Chicago River. Ericson sent the Scherzer Company and the Sanitary District specifications for the bridge in 1905. A design by John W. Page, the inventor of a bascule bridge over the Sanitary and Ship Canal, was rejected in March 1905 due to noncompliance to specifications. The Scherzer Company waited until the bidding deadline to submit two separate designs; both of these were also rejected due to noncompliance. Two contracts were bid out for the trunnion style bascule bridge that Ericson had pioneered; one contract for $81,369 (1905) went to the Jackson and Corbett Company for the substructure, and one for $111,983 (1905) went to the Roemheld and Gallery Company for superstructure work.

After the decision, Scherzer brought its argument with Ericson into court, arguing that the Department of Public Works had "maliciously, fraudulently and unlawfully" prohibited Scherzer from bidding their bridge design, which they claimed was both superior in quality and less expensive. A settlement was reached in August 1905, and construction for the new North Avenue Bridge began in early 1906.

Ericson was removed from the Public Works' bridge division and control over bridge design was passed to a separate administrative entity headed by Thomas G. Pihlfeldt. However, under Pihlfeldt's guidance the city continued to express preference for the trunnion bascule design.

=== 1907 bridge description ===
An illustration of a Pratt truss, the most common type of bridge built in the United States during the early 20th century. The 1907 North Avenue Bridge was a modified Pratt truss.

The bridge measured about 260 feet (79 m) from one abutment to the other. The bridge took the general form of a Pratt truss; however, where most Pratt trusses would incline downwards at the shoreline, the tail ends of the North Avenue Bridge truss curved upwards, tapering towards the center of the span. Where the tail ends were tallest, deep lateral braces provided support for the bridge.

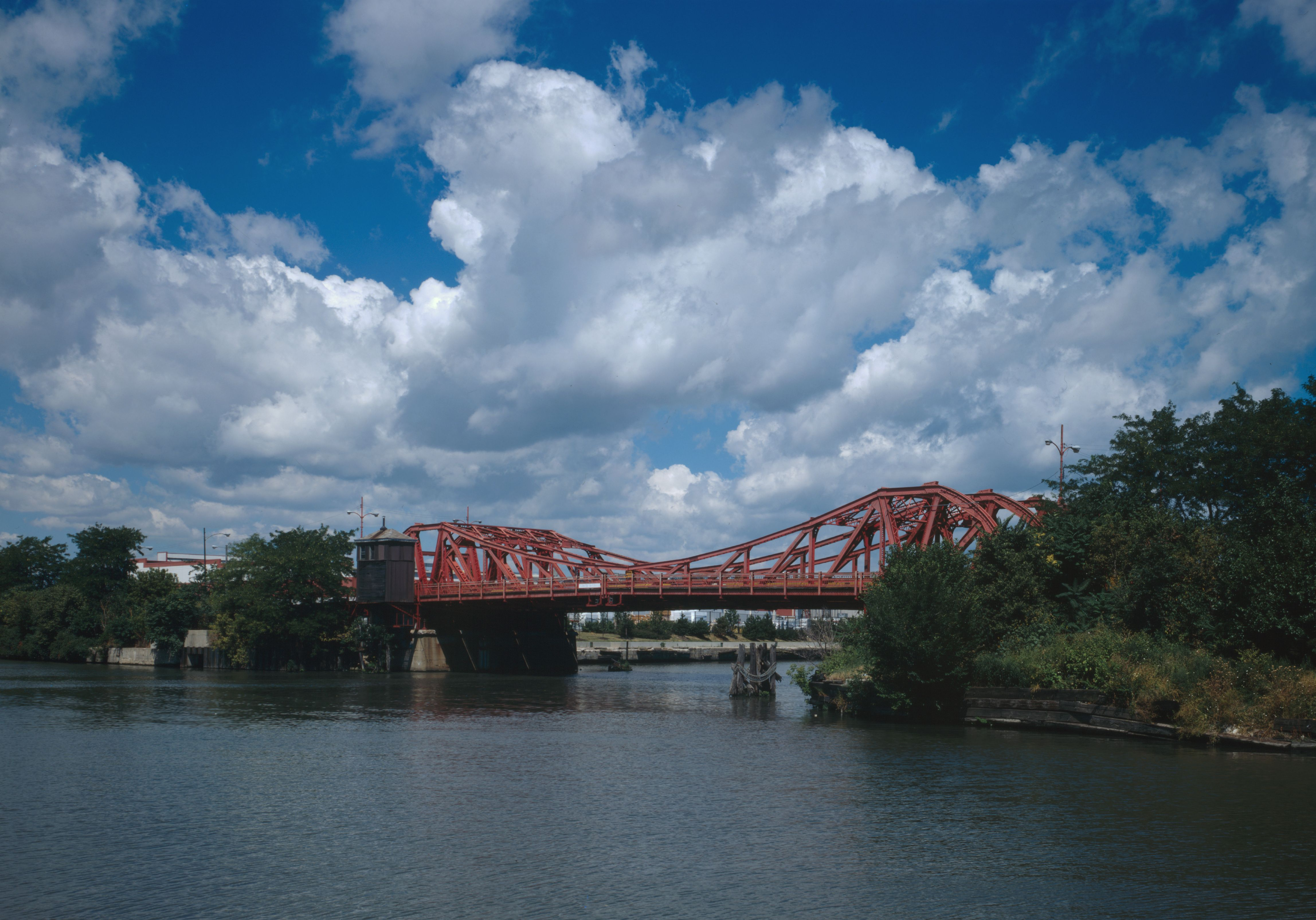
1907 North Avenue Bridge in 1999, looking north from Goose Island

The deck of the bridge was 60 feet (18 m) wide at the approaches. Upon construction, the roadway for the approaches consisted of wood blocks atop a steel-supported concrete slab. Approach sidewalks, made of concrete, had railings made of steel mesh that overlooked the river. On the movable leaves, a 42-foot (13 m) wide wooden deck was centered between two 9-foot (3 m) metal brackets that held plank sidewalks. The roadway itself was separated by the center truss. Originally, streetcar tracks ran on both sides of the bridge.

=== Decline of the North Branch shipping district ===
After new manufacturing facilities opened on the Calumet River in the southern portion of Chicago, shipping traffic on the Chicago River fell dramatically. By the mid-1920s, the Department of Public Works had floated a proposal to replace the moving bridges with fixed spans through a ten-year period from 1925–1935, citing high maintenance costs. The proposal was not acted upon, partially due to opposition by the Army Corps of Engineers; however, except for a brief resurgence in traffic during World War II, shipping volume remained low.

The historical bridge was last raised in 1972. By the 1990s, the Corps of Engineers agreed to city plans to convert the Chicago River's lift bridges to fixed spans. As the surrounding area transformed from primarily industrial to residential and commercial in nature, traffic volumes on the aging bridge increasing, causing bottlenecks.

As required by National Historic Preservation Act Section 106 regulations, the city offered the structure to any interested parties for relocation and preservation elsewhere. Because of the complexity of the outdated lifting mechanism, no cities offered to take the bridge.

=== 2007-2008 bridge replacement ===
Due to age and the high cost of maintenance, a replacement fixed-span bridge was built through 2007–2008. The new bridge is a fixed-span, hybrid suspension/cable-stayed bridge of the same height but nearly twice as long in length. The original bridge was two lanes wide; the new bridge has four lanes plus sidewalks, helping to reduce congestion caused by the 40,000 cars/day that travel on the bridge.

James McHugh Construction Company served as the general contractor for the new bridge. Designs for the new North Avenue Bridge were constrained by several factors. An active railroad line runs along the eastern bank of the river, requiring a level-crossing or overpass. The banks of the Chicago River were to be kept open and utilized for further development. The United States Coast Guard required the bridge to have a vertical clearance of 18 feet (5 m). Finally, the new crossing, situated at the northern tip of Goose Island and having a clear view to the Chicago skyline, was required to be aesthetically pleasing.

Due to rising costs of steel, the construction of a new bascule bridge was ruled out. The length of the crossing proved to be too short for a pure suspension bridge, while a pure cable-stayed bridge would require a larger tower than preferred for the site. As a result, engineers turned to the concept of a hybrid suspension/cable-stayed bridge.

Prior to work on the new bridge, work crews constructed and opened a temporary bridge just to the north of the new bridge. The temporary bridge allowed for the relocation of utilities, construction of an improved river wall and uninterrupted substructure construction for the new bridge. The center span was constructed on three barges in the Chicago River, because of Coast Guard regulations that required the channel to be open at all times. After the center span was constructed, it was towed to the bridge, where 16 jacks lifted the span into place.

The new bridge was completed in 22 months, and cost US$25,000,000 to build. The bridge is anchored by four pairs of pylons, with each pylon weighing 95,000 pounds (43,091 kg). The pylons rest on 10 smaller micropiles that extend 90 feet (27 m) into bedrock. From the pylons, a total of 24 cable-stays support the approach spans, as well as the ends of the center span. A suspension cable, running from anchorages at the feet of the bridge to the tops of the pylons, supports the middle portion of the center span.

The deck of the bridge is post-tensioned to allow horizontal forces of the bridge to be transferred to anchor blocks at the ends of the span. It was constructed with 10 inches (25 cm) of high-performance concrete, and with a 2-inch (5 cm) latex overlay. The total thickness of the deck is only 4 feet (1 m).

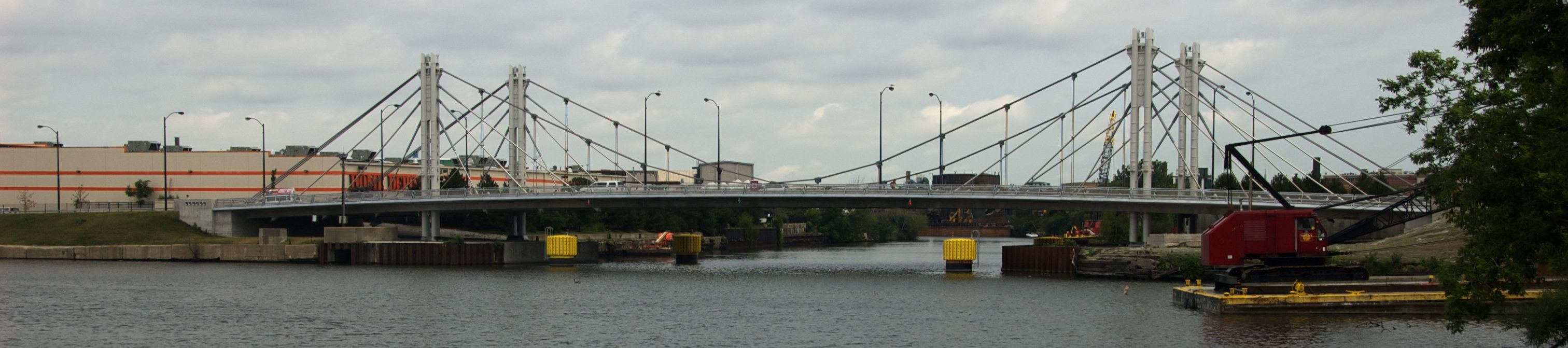
North Avenue Bridge from Goose Island in Chicago, Illinois.

== Gallery ==
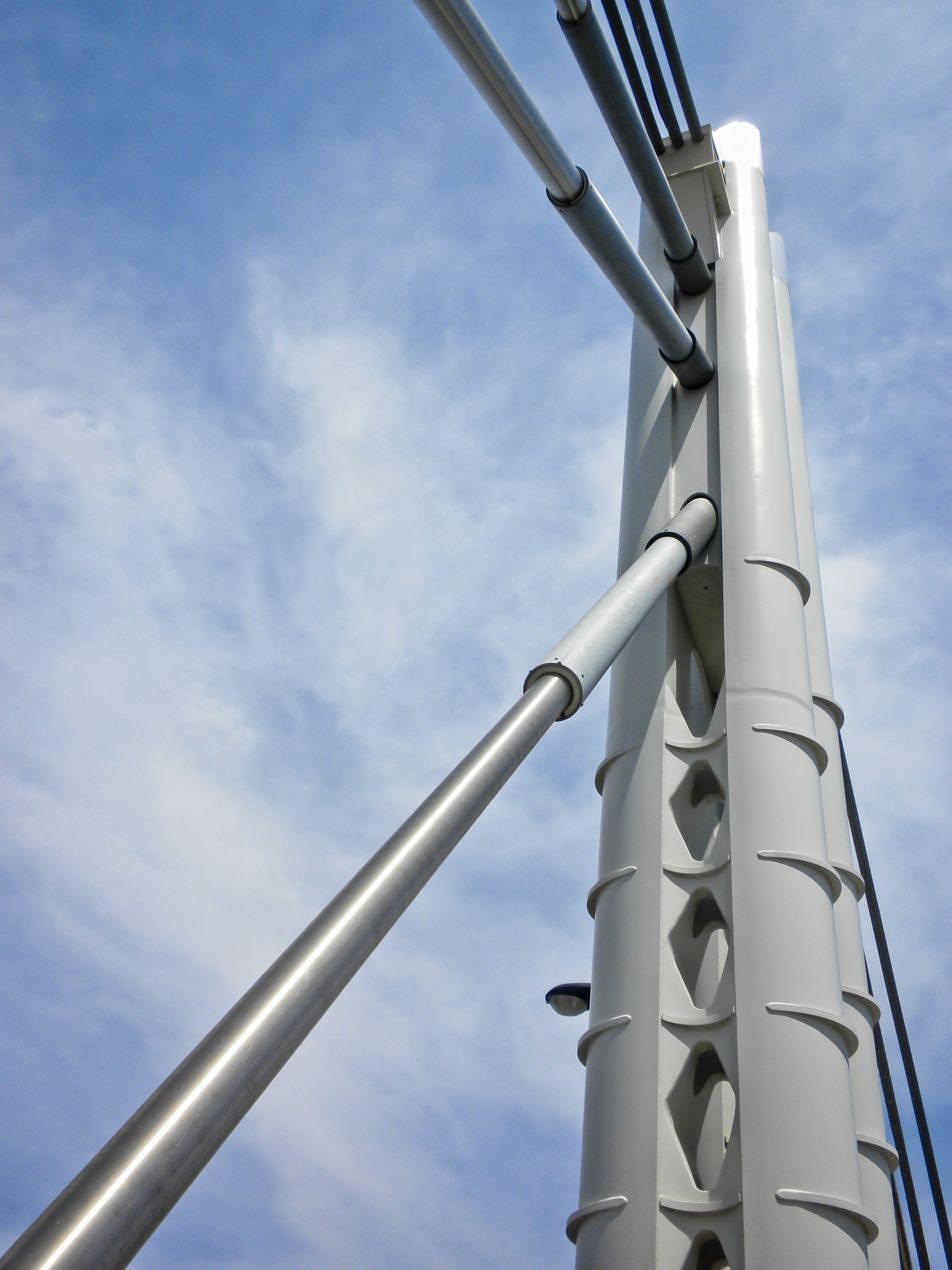
Hydraulic and suspension pier

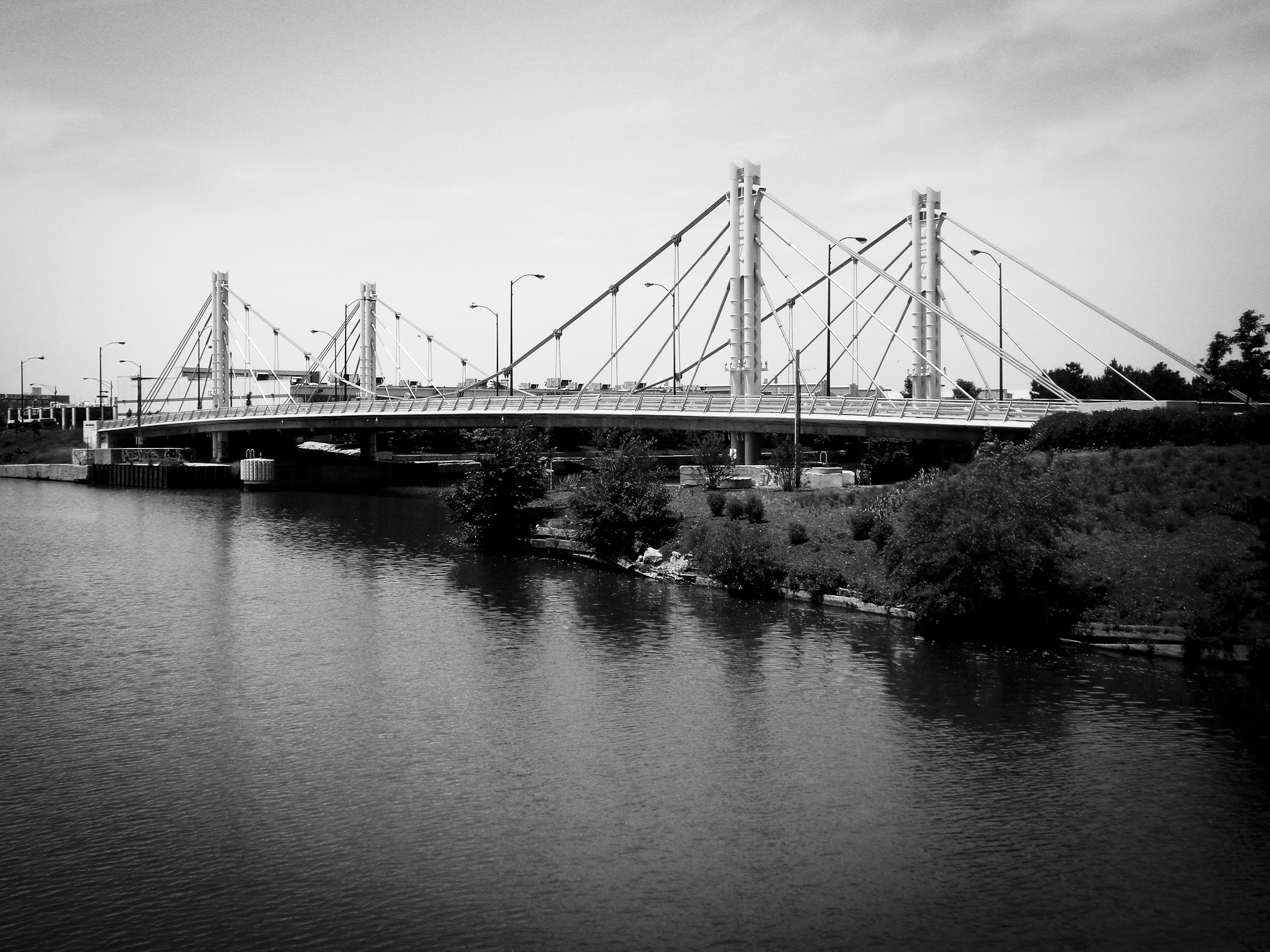
North Avenue Bridge from Goose Island

== See also ==
- List of bridges documented by the Historic American Engineering Record in Illinois
