= Lincoln Township, Illinois =

Lincoln Township
- Township
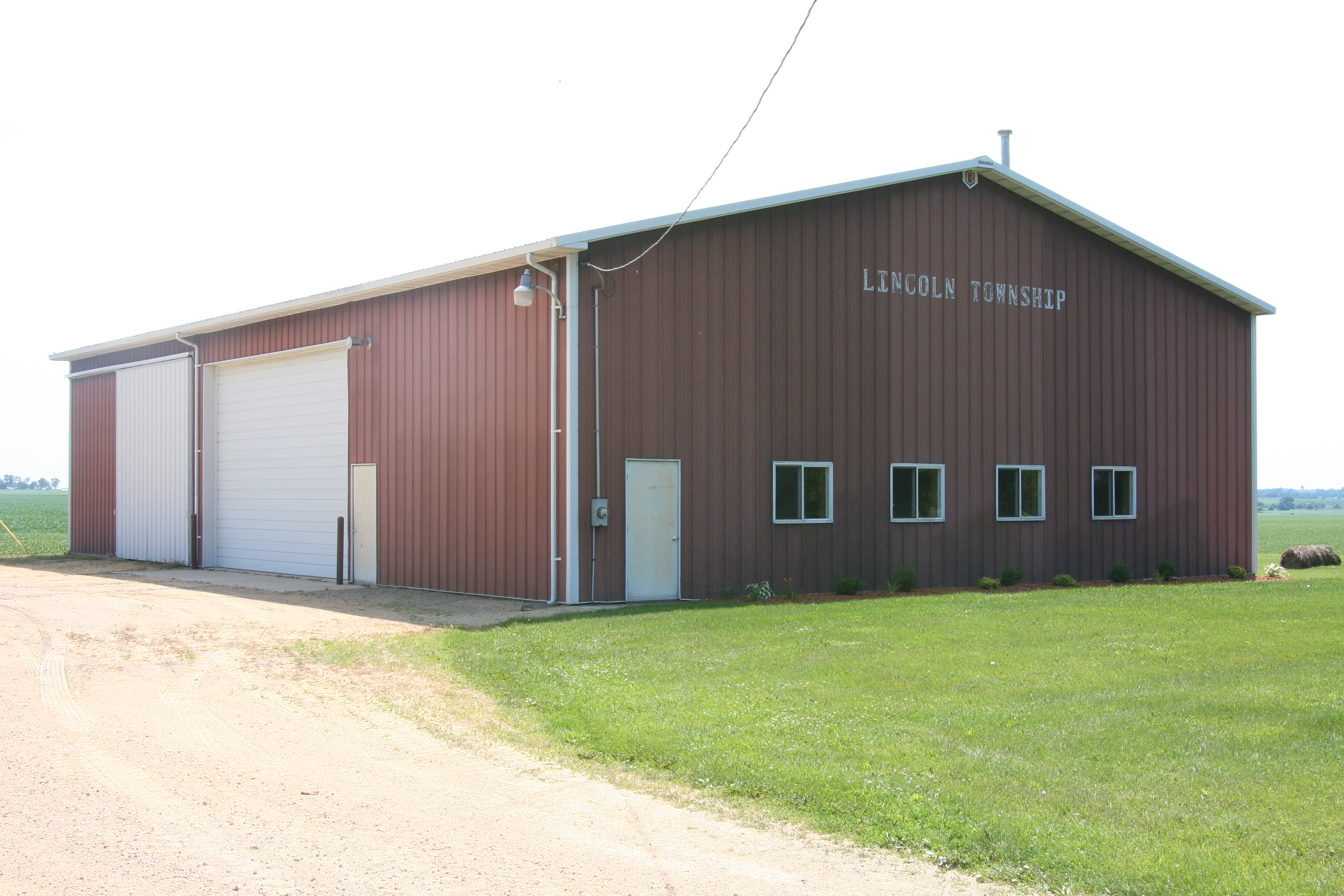
- Lincoln Township building in Haldane, Illinois.

- Location of Illinois in the United States
- Coordinates: 42°03′38″N 89°34′26″W
- Country: United States
- State: Illinois
- County: Ogle
- Settled: September, 1869

Government
  - Mayor: Donald Nelson

Area
  - Total: 36.1 sq mi (93 km^{2})
  - Land: 36.1 sq mi (93 km^{2})
  - Water: 0 sq mi (0 km^{2})
- Elevation: 915 ft (279 m)

Population (2010)
  - Estimate (2016): 461
  - Density: 13.3/sq mi (5.1/km^{2})
- Time zone: UTC-6 (CST)
  - Summer (DST): UTC-5 (CDT)
- FIPS code: 17-141-43549

Lincoln Township is located in Ogle County, Illinois, USA. At the 2010 census, its population was 481 and it contained 199 housing units. Lincoln Township was originally formed as Haldane Township from portions of Buffalo and Mt. Morris Townships in September 1869. Haldane was renamed Lincoln in December 1873.

== Geography ==
According to the 2010 census, the township has a total area of 36.1 square miles (93 km^{2}), all land.

== Demographics ==
Historical population
Census	Pop.	Note	%±
2016 (est.)	461
U.S. Decennial Census
