= Haldane, Illinois =

Haldane
- Unincorporated community
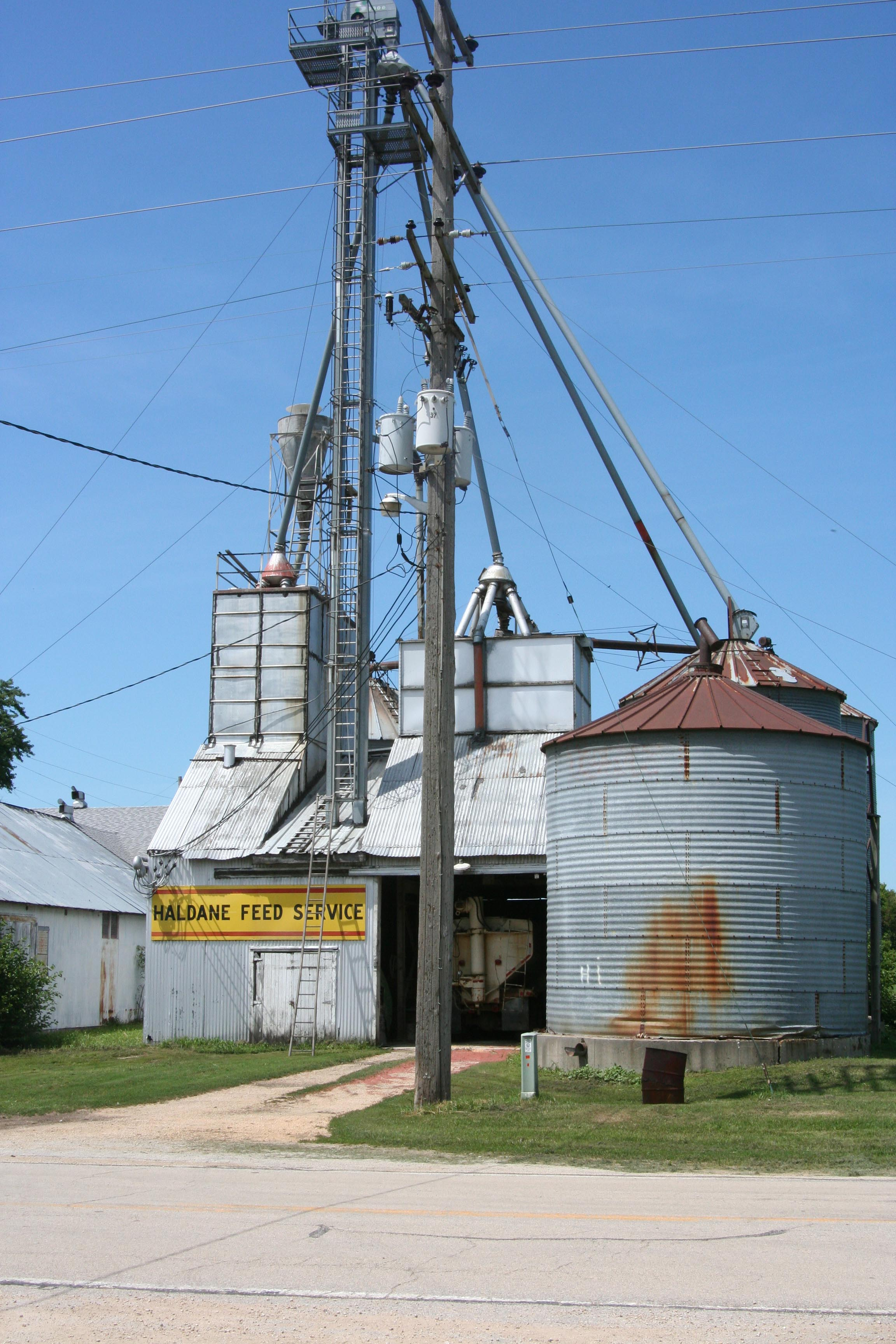
- Old feed mill in Haldane.

- Location of Haldane within Illinois Haldane (the United States)
- Coordinates: 42°04′45″N 89°34′26″W
- Country: United States
- State: Illinois
- County: Ogle
- Township: Lincoln
- Elevation: 906 ft (276 m)
- Time zone: UTC-6 (CST)
  - Summer (DST): UTC-5 (CDT)
- Zip code: 61030
- Area code: 815
- GNIS feature ID: 409620

Haldane is an unincorporated community in Ogle County, Illinois, United States, located south of Forreston and west of Mount Morris.

== History ==
Haldane had its start in 1858 as a rail station. The community was named for Alexander Haldane, a railroad official.
