= William Haldane =

Sir William Stowell Haldane WS (19 August 1864 – 7 November 1951) was a Scottish civil servant who was Crown Agent for Scotland.

== Biography ==
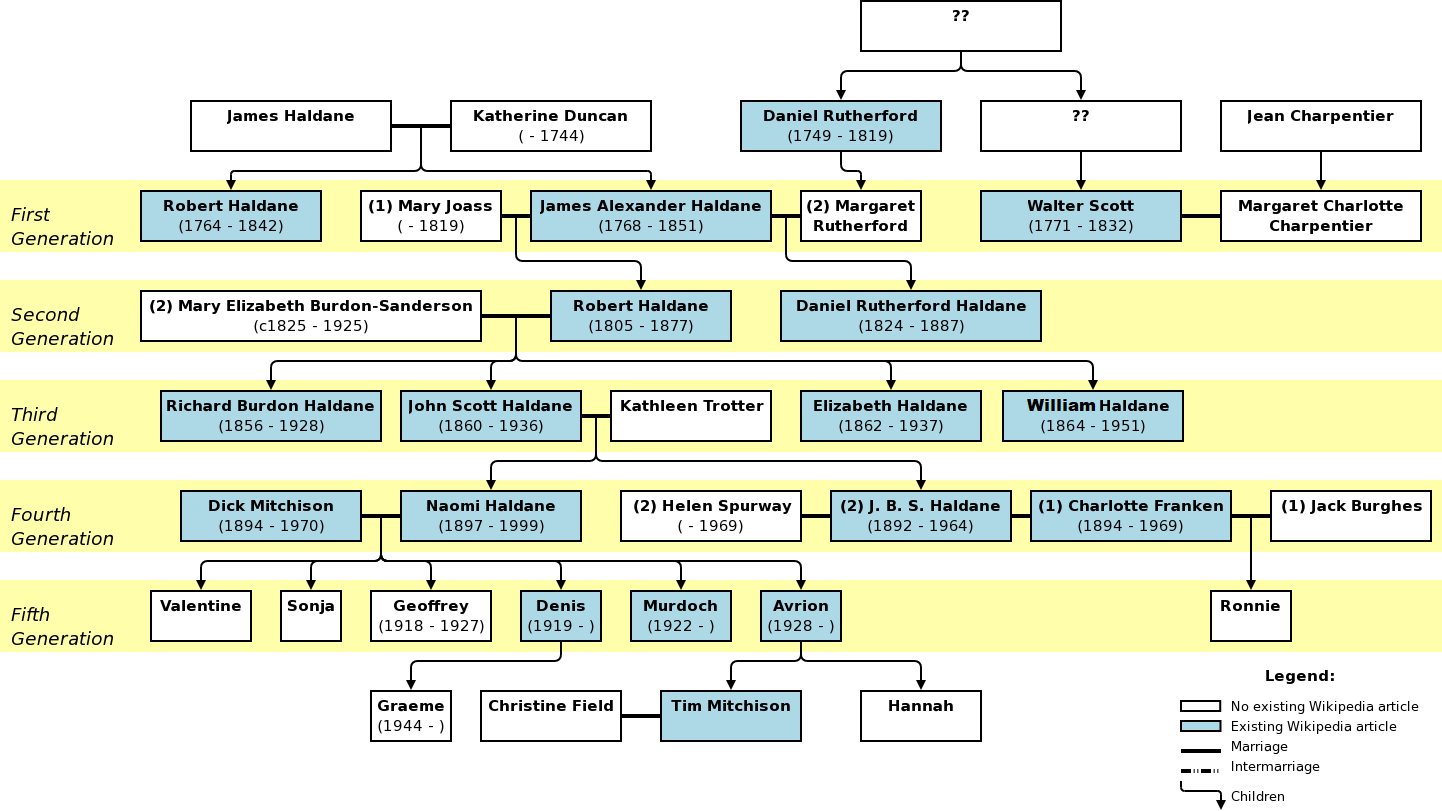
Haldane family tree

Haldane was born in Edinburgh to Mary Elizabeth Burdon-Sanderson and Robert Haldane. His grandfather was the evangelist James Alexander Haldane. His mother was the daughter of Richard Burdon-Sanderson and the granddaughter of Sir Thomas Burdon. His maternal uncle was the physiologist John Scott Burdon-Sanderson. He was the brother of Elizabeth Haldane, John Scott Haldane and Richard Burdon Haldane, 1st Viscount Haldane.

He was educated at Edinburgh Academy and the University of Edinburgh.

He married Margaret Edith Stuart Nelson (died 1943). They had three children:

- Thomas Graeme Nelson Haldane (1897–1981)
- Archibald Richard Burdon Haldane (1900–1982)
- Mary Elizabeth Campbell-Fraser (1895–1983)

He died in Cloan, Perthshire, aged 87.
