= James Haldane (disambiguation) =

James Haldane may refer to:

- James Haldane (1768–1851), Scottish religious leader
- James Haldane (footballer) (1890–1915), Scottish footballer
- James Haldane (diplomat) (1692–1742), British soldier and diplomat
