= Graeme Haldane =

Scottish engineer

Thomas Graeme Nelson Haldane, known as Graeme Haldane (14 December 1897 – 24 June 1981), was a Scottish engineer.

He was the son of Sir William Haldane and his wife Edith Nelson. He was a nephew of Elizabeth Haldane, Richard Burdon Haldane, 1st Viscount Haldane and John Scott Haldane, and a cousin of the writer Naomi Mitchison.

He was educated at Royal Naval College, Osborne and Royal Naval College, Dartmouth and in the First World War served in the Royal Navy on HM Ships Doris Valiant and Tiger. He was present at the Battle of Jutland.

In 1919 he went to Trinity College, Cambridge, where he was President of the Cambridge University Liberal Club. He worked at the Cavendish Laboratory under Ernest Rutherford, and helped establish the National Grid.

In 1928 he joined Merz and McLellan engineering firm, and in 1941 became a partner. In the summer of 1932 he was a member of a Fabian Society group which visited the Soviet Union, where he studied power stations and energy supply. In the following year he contributed the chapter on "Power and Industrial Developments" to a book entitled Twelve Studies in Soviet Russia edited by Margaret Cole. In 1948 he was President of the Institution of Electrical Engineers and won its James Watt Gold Medal in 1953. He retired in 1972.

He had a son named Richard W. Haldane.

== Honours ==
In 2021 he was inducted into the Scottish Engineering Hall of Fame.
