= Iowa Highway 64 =

State highway in Iowa, United States

Iowa Highway 64
- Iowa 64 highlighted in red

Route information
- Maintained by Iowa DOT
- Length: 64.355 mi (103.569 km)
- Tourist routes: Grant Wood Scenic Byway

Major junctions
- West end: US 151 in Anamosa
- US 61 in Maquoketa; US 67 / Great River Road near Sabula; US 52 / Great River Road near Sabula
- East end: US 52 / IL 64 at Savanna

Location
- Country: United States
- State: Iowa
- Counties: Jones; Jackson

Highway system
- Iowa Primary Highway System; Interstate; US; State; Secondary; Scenic
| ← US 63 | → US 65 |

Iowa Highway 64 (Iowa 64) is a 64-mile-long (103 km) state highway that runs through two counties in east central Iowa. It begins at an interchange with U.S. Route 151 (US 151) in Anamosa and ends at the Dale Gardner Veterans Memorial Bridge over the Mississippi River near Sabula. It continues through Illinois as Illinois Route 64. The western half of the highway is the Grant Wood Scenic Byway. Originally, Iowa 64 spanned the length of the state and began at the Missouri River in Council Bluffs where it connected to N-64 in Omaha. It headed northeast and east on highways that today are roughly parallel to Interstate 80 (I-80) and US 30. In 1969, however, Iowa 64 was shortened to its current routing.

== Route description ==
Iowa 64 begins at an interchange with US 151 in Anamosa. West of the interchange, the road is County Road E28 (CR E28), which becomes Third Street in Anamosa, while to the east, Iowa 64 begins its eastward trek. It leaves Anamosa heading to the south-southeast. After an S curve that takes the road to the south and then back east, the highway passes Antioch School, which Iowa painter Grant Wood attended for four years.

Iowa 38 overlaps Iowa 64 for the next two miles (3.2 km) before splitting off to the north. Iowa 64 continues east for another 5 miles (8.0 km) and arrives in the town of Wyoming. Upon arriving in Wyoming, Iowa 64 meets with another north–south state highway, this time Iowa 136. At the eastern end of Wyoming, Iowa 64 / Iowa 136 come to a T intersection where the original stretch of Iowa 64 comes to an end. Iowa 136 splits off to the south, while Iowa 64 splits off to the north very briefly before curving eastbound once again. Five miles (8.0 km) after leaving Wyoming, Iowa 64 enters Jackson County. Iowa 64 passes through the small towns of Monmouth and Baldwin and bypasses the village of Nashville before arriving in Maquoketa, the seat of Jackson County.

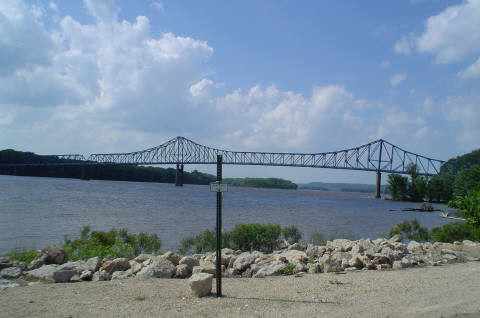
The Savanna–Sabula Bridge was the eastern end of US 52 and Iowa 64 in Iowa until 2017

Iowa 64 intersects US 61 in western Maquoketa. The stretch of Iowa 64 between US 61 and Main Street in Maquoketa is a part of US 61 Business. At the eastern city limits of Maquoketa, Iowa 64 intersects with Iowa 62 which heads north-northeast from Maquoketa towards Bellevue. After Maquoketa, Iowa 64 continues east through rolling farmland before descending into the Goose Lake Channel and intersects CR Z20, formerly Iowa 113, near Spragueville. Iowa 64 leaves the Goose Lake Channel east of Preston.

About seven miles (11 km) east of Miles, Iowa 64 meets US 67, which joins Iowa 64 from the south for its last one-half mile (800 m). US 67 ends at the intersection with US 52 west of Sabula. Iowa 64 and US 52 overlap each other for their last four miles (6.4 km) in Iowa. Before entering Sabula, US 52 / Iowa 64 cross the Mississippi River backwater Sabula Lakes causeway. North of Sabula, the US 52 / Iowa 64 causeway divides the Mississippi River from Sheepshead Bay, another backwater area. At this point, US 52 / Iowa 64, directionally signed south and east, respectively, are heading north. US 52 / Iowa 64 turn east and cross the main channel of the Mississippi River on the Dale Gardner Veterans Memorial Bridge, becoming US 52 / Illinois Route 64 (IL 64). Immediately after entering Illinois at Savanna, US 52/ IL 64 intersect IL 84. Illinois Route 64 provides a direct link to Chicago.

== Major intersections ==
| County | Location | mi | km | Destinations | Notes |
|---|---|---|---|---|---|
| Jones | Anamosa | 0.000 | 0.000 | US 151 / CR E28 west / Grant Wood Scenic Byway – Cedar Rapids, Dubuque | |
| Jones | Jackson Township | 7.861 | 12.651 | Iowa 38 south – Olin | Western end of Iowa 38 overlap |
| Jones | Madison Township | 9.868 | 15.881 | Iowa 38 north – Monticello | Eastern end of Iowa 38 overlap |
| Jones | Wyoming | 14.319 | 23.044 | Iowa 136 north – Onslow, Cascade | Western end of Iowa 136 overlap |
| Jones | Wyoming | 15.281 | 24.592 | Iowa 136 south – Oxford Junction | Eastern end of Iowa 136 overlap |
| Jackson | Maquoketa | 32.869 | 52.898 | US 61 – Dubuque, Davenport | |
| Jackson | Maquoketa | 34.713 | 55.865 | Iowa 62 north / Grant Wood Scenic Byway – Andrew, Bellevue | |
| Jackson | Union Township | 60.134 | 96.776 | US 67 south / Great River Road south – Clinton | Western end of US 67 overlap |
| Jackson | Union Township | 60.601 | 97.528 | US 52 north / US 67 ends / Great River Road north – Bellevue | National end of US 67; western end of US 52 overlap |
| Mississippi River | | 64.355 | 103.569 | Dale Gardner Veterans Memorial Bridge | |
| Mississippi River | | 64.355 | 103.569 | US 52 east / IL 64 east – Savanna | Continuation into Illinois |
1.000 mi = 1.609 km; 1.000 km = 0.621 mi: Concurrency terminus
