= Law enforcement in Jackson County, Iowa =

Jackson County, Iowa, is patrolled by several different agencies. The primary law enforcement agency for the county is the Jackson County Sheriff's Department; there are two other agencies that operate continuously, the other two being the Maquoketa Police Department and the Bellevue Police Department, and several more limited agencies. Ansel Briggs, the first governor of the state of Iowa, was at one time a Jackson County Sheriff.

== County agencies ==
=== Jackson County Sheriff's Department ===
In the state of Iowa, the title of sheriff is an elected position. The current sheriff of Jackson County is Brent Kilburg. As of 2021 The JCSO is one of the three 24-7 agencies in Jackson County, along with the Maquoketa Police Department and the Bellevue Police Department. For its patrol vehicles, the Sheriff's Department uses the Chevrolet Tahoe and Ford Explorer. The department also owns one Chevrolet Silverado truck. The department has one K-9 unit. The Sheriff's Office is located at 1700 E Maple Street in Maquoketa.

The jurisdiction of the sheriff's office includes all of Jackson County. They have authority throughout the entire county, however they are the primary law enforcement agency for the county's rural areas and the following cities:

- Andrew
- Baldwin
- La Motte
- Miles
- Monmouth
- St. Donatus
- Spragueville
- Springbrook

The Sheriff's Office is responsible in enforcing state, county and city ordinances within the county, and for

- Reports of, and investigation of, thefts, vandalisms, assaults, illegal drug activity, reported child and/or domestic abuse, accidents and all other criminal allegations. Deputies are also responsible for the enforcement of traffic laws.
- Duties related with civil process including but not limited to: original notices and petitions, garnishments, orders, sheriff sales, room and board reimbursements, evictions, protective orders and restraining orders, involuntary commitment of persons with mental illness and / or substance abuse, duties related to condemnation of private property and the execution and return all writs and other legal processes issued by lawful authority.
- Superintendence of the Jackson County Detention Center and the transportation of prisoners.

The department consists of the sheriff, chief deputy, seven full-time deputies and one part-time deputy.

=== Jackson County Conservation ===
The primary role of Jackson County Conservation officers is to police and keep-up campgrounds and parks that are claimed by the Jackson County Conservation Board. These rangers have police authority and have the power of arrest. The executive Director is Nathan Jones.

The responsibilities of the Jackson County Conservation Board are to:

- Manage county parks, campgrounds, wildlife areas and Hurstville Interpretive Center
- Create education programs for residents and students of the county
- Maintain outdoor recreation areas for: camping, hiking, fishing, canoeing, hunting, biking.

== City agencies ==
=== Bellevue Police Department ===
The Bellevue Police Department, a 24/7 agency, is the primary law enforcement agency for the city of Bellevue, Iowa. The current chief is Lynn Schwager. As of 2011 the primary patrol vehicle used is the Chevrolet Tahoe and Chevrolet truck.

The primary responsibilities of the Bellevue PD are to respond to calls and patrol the city of Bellevue. They, like other city agencies, may be called into other parts of the county at the request of the JCSO or dispatchers.

=== Maquoketa Police Department ===
The Maquoketa Police Department is the primary law enforcement agency for the city of Maquoketa, Iowa. The Maquoketa PD is one of the three 24-7 law enforcement agencies in Jackson County. The primary patrol vehicle for the MPD is the Ford Crown Victoria Police Interceptor. The agency also owns a Jeep Grand Cherokee and a Chevrolet Impala, which is used by the city's K-9 unit. The MPD is the only agency in the county to have a School Resource Officer (SRO). The agency also runs the county's emergency communications for law enforcement, fire, and EMS. The agency contains the largest force of reserve officers in the county. As of 2011 the chief is Brad Koranda.

The primary responsibilities of the Maquoketa Police Department are to respond to calls and patrol the city of Maquoketa. Like other city agencies in the county, MPD officers can respond to calls outside of their jurisdiction at the request of the JCSO or dispatchers. The department's SRO handles law enforcement within the Maquoketa Community School District. Their K-9 unit will often participate in locker checks in the school system. The department's reserve officers often patrol at special functions such as football and basketball games.

=== Preston Police Department ===
The Preston Police Department is the primary law enforcement agency for the city of Preston, Iowa and Miles, Iowa with a 28E agreement.The primary patrol vehicle for the Preston Police Dept. is the Chevrolet Impala, one of which is unmarked. As of 2018 the chief is Scott Heiar.

The primary responsibilities of the PPD are to respond to calls and patrol the city of Preston. Like other agencies, the PPD can respond to calls outside their jurisdiction at the request of the JCSO.

=== Sabula Police Department ===
The Sabula Police Department is the primary law enforcement agency for the city of Sabula, Iowa, the only island city in the state. As of 2021 the chief is Shane Nixon. The Sabula Police Department has two patrol units as well as two part time police officers.

The primary responsibilities of the Sabula Police Department, like other city agencies, is to patrol and respond to calls in their jurisdiction. They will respond to calls other places in the county at the request of the JCSO dispatch and need of services from area residents.

The Sabula Police Department is responsible in enforcing state, county and city ordinances within the county, and city of Sabula Iowa.

Officers will enforce and respond to Reports of, and investigation of, thefts, vandalisms, assaults, illegal drug activity, reported child and/or domestic abuse, accidents and all other criminal allegations. Officers are also responsible for the enforcement of traffic laws.
