= Preston, Iowa =

- City
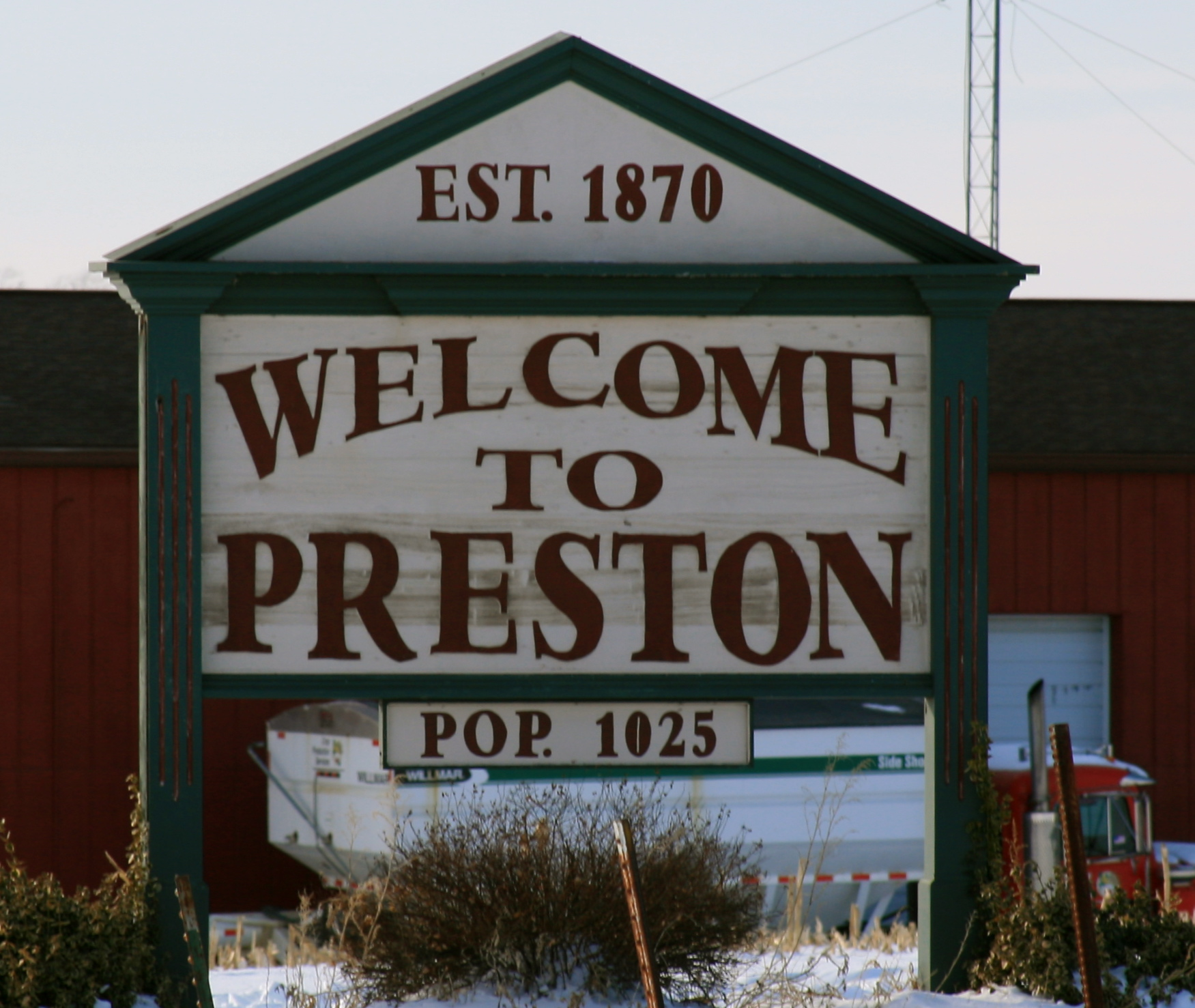
- Welcome sign in Preston

- Location of Preston, Iowa
- Coordinates: 42°02′57″N 90°23′49″W
- Country: United States
- State: Iowa
- County: Jackson

Area
  - Total: 0.86 sq mi (2.23 km^{2})
  - Land: 0.86 sq mi (2.23 km^{2})
  - Water: 0 sq mi (0.00 km^{2})
- Elevation: 669 ft (204 m)

Population (2020)
  - Total: 949
  - Density: 1,102.1/sq mi (425.52/km^{2})
- Time zone: UTC-6 (Central (CST))
  - Summer (DST): UTC-5 (CDT)
- ZIP code: 52069
- Area code: 563
- FIPS code: 19-64605
- GNIS feature ID: 2396273
- Website: www.prestoniowa.com

Preston is a city in Jackson County, Iowa, United States. The population was 949 at the time of the 2020 census.

== History ==
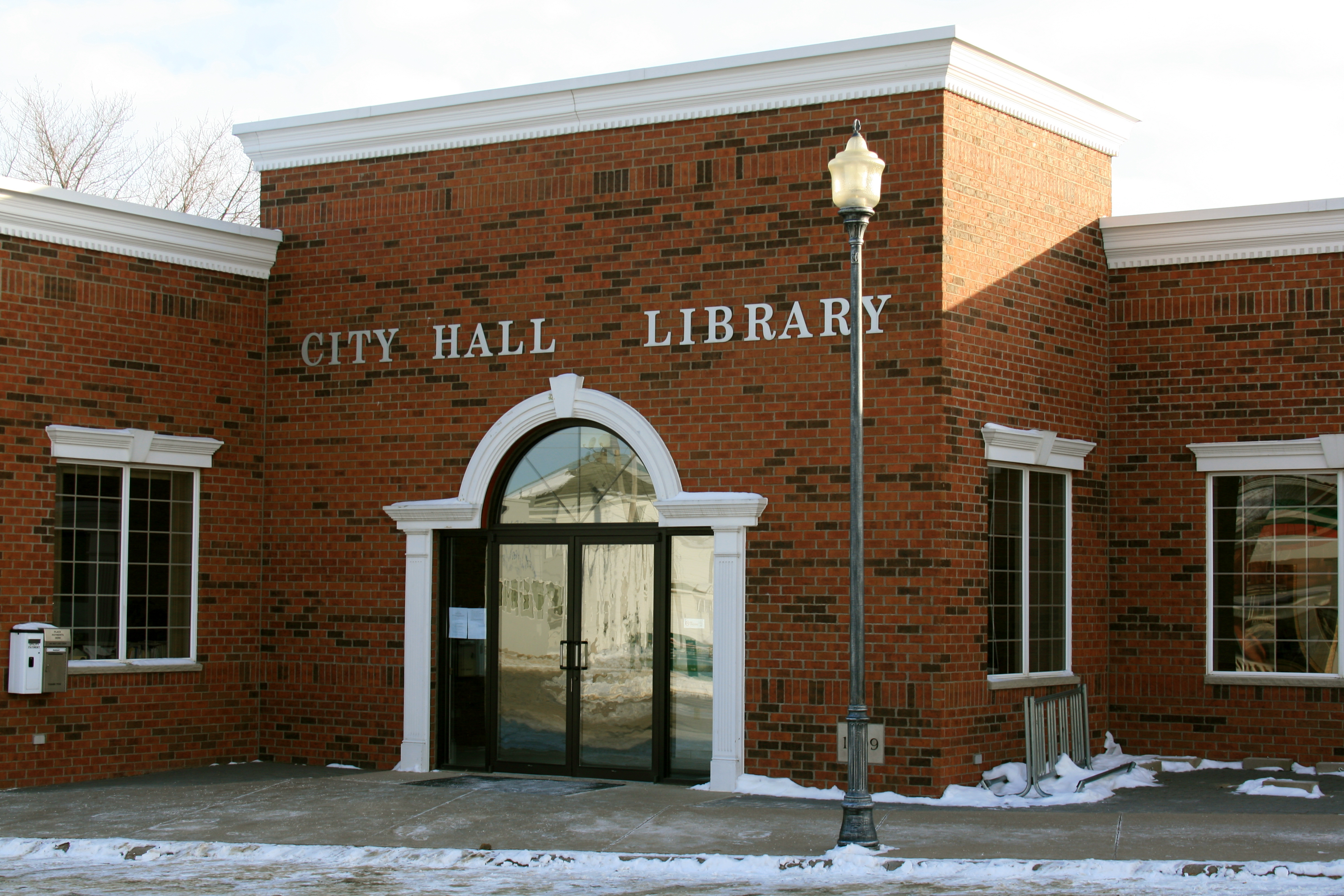
City Hall & Library

Preston got its start in the year 1870, following construction of the railroad through that territory.

Preston is named for one of its founders, I. M. Preston. Those present at the time of the town's platting were allowed to name Preston's streets after themselves.

== Geography ==
According to the United States Census Bureau, the city has a total area of 0.96 square miles (2.49 km^{2}), all land.

== Demographics ==
Historical populations
Year	Pop.	±%
1890	489	—
1900	593	+21.3%
1910	642	+8.3%
1920	648	+0.9%
1930	596	−8.0%
1940	602	+1.0%
1950	684	+13.6%
1960	819	+19.7%
1970	950	+16.0%
1980	1,120	+17.9%
1990	1,025	−8.5%
2000	949	−7.4%
2010	1,012	+6.6%
2020	949	−6.2%
Source:"U.S. Census website". United States Census Bureau. and Iowa Data Center; Source: U.S. Decennial Census

=== 2020 census ===
As of the census of 2020, there were 949 people, 403 households, and 265 families residing in the city. The population density was 1,102.1 inhabitants per square mile (425.5/km^{2}). There were 436 housing units at an average density of 506.3 per square mile (195.5/km^{2}). The racial makeup of the city was 97.6% White, 0.6% Black or African American, 0.1% Native American, 0.0% Asian, 0.0% Pacific Islander, 0.7% from other races and 0.9% from two or more races. Hispanic or Latino persons of any race comprised 1.9% of the population.

Of the 403 households, 28.5% of which had children under the age of 18 living with them, 51.6% were married couples living together, 7.2% were cohabitating couples, 23.8% had a female householder with no spouse or partner present and 17.4% had a male householder with no spouse or partner present. 34.2% of all households were non-families. 29.8% of all households were made up of individuals, 16.1% had someone living alone who was 65 years old or older.

The median age in the city was 42.9 years. 24.9% of the residents were under the age of 20; 5.4% were between the ages of 20 and 24; 21.9% were from 25 and 44; 26.4% were from 45 and 64; and 21.4% were 65 years of age or older. The gender makeup of the city was 49.6% male and 50.4% female.

=== 2010 census ===
As of the census of 2010, there were 1,012 people, 418 households, and 280 families residing in the city. The population density was 1,054.2 inhabitants per square mile (407.0/km^{2}). There were 464 housing units at an average density of 483.3 per square mile (186.6/km^{2}). The racial makeup of the city was 98.6% White, 0.5% African American, and 0.9% from two or more races. Hispanic or Latino of any race were 0.6% of the population.

There were 418 households, of which 33.3% had children under the age of 18 living with them, 53.6% were married couples living together, 9.8% had a female householder with no husband present, 3.6% had a male householder with no wife present, and 33.0% were non-families. 29.4% of all households were made up of individuals, and 17.7% had someone living alone who was 65 years of age or older. The average household size was 2.42 and the average family size was 2.97.

The median age in the city was 39.2 years. 25.9% of residents were under the age of 18; 6.3% were between the ages of 18 and 24; 25.2% were from 25 to 44; 24.6% were from 45 to 64; and 17.7% were 65 years of age or older. The gender makeup of the city was 48.8% male and 51.2% female.

=== 2000 census ===
As of the census of 2000, there were 949 people, 417 households, and 250 families residing in the city. The population density was 962.2 inhabitants per square mile (371.5/km^{2}). There were 433 housing units at an average density of 439.0 per square mile (169.5/km^{2}). The racial makeup of the city was 99.89% White and 0.11% Pacific Islander. Hispanic or Latino of any race were 0.11% of the population.

There were 417 households, out of which 29.0% had children under the age of 18 living with them, 51.1% were married couples living together, 7.0% had a female householder with no husband present, and 40.0% were non-families. 35.7% of all households were made up of individuals, and 20.6% had someone living alone who was 65 years of age or older. The average household size was 2.26 and the average family size was 2.97.

Age spread: 23.1% under the age of 18, 10.1% from 18 to 24, 28.8% from 25 to 44, 20.3% from 45 to 64, and 17.7% who were 65 years of age or older. The median age was 37 years. For every 100 females, there were 90.9 males. For every 100 females age 18 and over, there were 89.1 males.

The median income for a household in the city was $35,909, and the median income for a family was $47,375. Males had a median income of $32,150 versus $22,031 for females. The per capita income for the city was $17,639. About 4.0% of families and 6.8% of the population were below the poverty line, including 7.7% of those under age 18 and 14.6% of those age 65 or over.

== Education ==
Preston is a part of the Easton Valley Community School District, formed in 2013 by the merger of the Preston Community School District and the East Central Community School District of the towns of Miles and Sabula.

== Notable people ==
- Al Feuerbach, former track and field athlete
- Bob Oldis, scout for the Florida Marlins and a former professional baseball player
- Fred Schule 1904 Olympic gold medalist in hurdles
- Roger Stewart, Iowa State Senator
