= Antioch School =

Antioch School may refer to:

- Antioch School (Anamosa, Iowa), listed on the National Register of Historic Places in Jones County, Iowa
- Antioch School (Pauline, Nebraska), listed on the National Register of Historic Places in Adams County, Nebraska
- Antioch School (Yellow Springs, Ohio), oldest democratic school in the United States
- Antioch Dependent School District No. 15, Elmore City, Oklahoma, listed on the National Register of Historic Places in Garvin County, Oklahoma
- Catechetical School of Antioch of early Christianity
