= Spragueville =

Spragueville may refer to:

- Spragueville, Iowa
- Spragueville, Pennsylvania
