= Midland Community School District =

School district in Wyoming, Iowa, United States

Coordinates: 42.060041°N 91.006771°W

Location
- Wyoming, Iowa Jones, Clinton, Cedar, and Jackson counties United States
- Coordinates: 42.060041, -91.006771

District information
- Type: Local school district
- Grades: K-12
- Superintendent: Todd Hawley
- Schools: 2
- Budget: $10,177,000 (2020-21)
- NCES District ID: 1919200

Students and staff
- Students: 508 (2022-23)
- Teachers: 39.37 FTE
- Staff: 58.20 FTE
- Student–teacher ratio: 12.90
- Athletic conference: Tri-Rivers
- District mascot: Eagles
- Colors: Black and Gold

Other information
- Website: www.midland.k12.ia.us

The Midland Community School District is a rural public school district headquartered in Wyoming, Iowa. It operates an elementary school in Oxford Junction and a middle-high (secondary) school and a learning center in Wyoming.

The district is located in sections of Jones, Jackson, Clinton and a small area in Cedar counties. It serves Wyoming, Oxford Junction, Lost Nation, Monmouth, and Onslow. Additionally, the district shares the town of Olin with the Anamosa Community School District.

== History ==
The district was founded in 1962 when the Wyoming, Onslow, Monmouth, Canton and Center Junction school districts consolidated to be Midland. The district is named after a Chicago and North Western Railway branch line nicknamed "Iowa Midland Railway" which ran through the area.

The Lost Nation school district merged into the Midland district on July 1, 1993, and the Oxford Junction district merged with it on July 1, 1995.

In 2009 the district had about 510 students, with enrollment decreasing. Nathan Marting served as superintendent and secondary school principal for Midland until 2009, when he left to become the superintendent of the Jesup Community School District.

In 2019, the Olin Consolidated Community School District began to grade share its 6th-12th grades with Midland; students from the district can go to either Midland or Anamosa.

== Schools ==
The district operates two schools:

- Midland Elementary School
- Midland Middle/High School

=== Midland High School ===
==== Athletics ====
The Eagles participate in the Tri-Rivers Conference in the following sports:

- Football
- Cross Country
- Volleyball
- Basketball
- Wrestling
- Golf
- Track and Field
- Baseball
- Softball

== See also ==
- List of school districts in Iowa
- List of high schools in Iowa
