= Easton Valley Community School District =

Public school district in Preston, Iowa, United States

Coordinates: 42.047712°N 90.398147°W

Location
- Preston, Iowa Jackson and Clinton counties United States
- Coordinates: 42.047712, -90.398147

District information
- Type: Local school district
- Grades: K-12
- Established: 2013
- Superintendent: Chris Fee
- Schools: 2
- Budget: $10,487,000 (2020-21)
- NCES District ID: 1910130

Students and staff
- Students: 478 (2022-23)
- Teachers: 45.37 FTE
- Staff: 30.48 FTE
- Student–teacher ratio: 11.00
- Athletic conference: Tri-Rivers
- District mascot: River Hawks
- Colors: Orange and Gray

Other information
- Website: www.eastonvalleycsd.com

Easton Valley Community School District is a rural public school district headquartered in Preston, Iowa, United States. It is located in sections of Jackson and Clinton counties, and serves Preston, Miles, Sabula, and Spragueville.

It operates its PreKindergarten through grade 6 elementary school in Miles, and its grade 7-12 secondary (middle-high) school in Preston. Its school colors are orange and gray, and its mascot is the River Hawk.

== History ==
It was formed on July 1, 2013, by the merger of the East Central Community School District and the Preston Community School District. Voters in both districts approved the merger, by 776–122 in the Preston district and 620–598 in the East Central district. Its school colors and mascot were selected at the time of the district's legal creation.

The predecessor East Central district had a whole grade-sharing agreement in which East Central sent students in grades 7–12 to the Northeast Community School District. Northeast later sued the new Easton Valley district after that district stated that the grade-sharing agreement was no longer in place as Easton Valley was not the same district as the former East Central, and therefore had refused to pay Northeast related costs. The Northeast district began asking for compensation after the Iowa Supreme Court decided that the grade-sharing agreement was still in place; Northeast argued that the contract had been breached. In 2015 a settlement was reached involving Easton Valley paying Northeast $450,000.

The leadership of what would become Easton Valley was seeking to close the Sabula school due to potential future upkeep costs and because of how old it was; it was to retain the Miles school. The Sabula school remained vacant until 2015, when the Easton Valley board voted unanimously in favor of demolishing it. The school district and the city government both agreed to demolition after considering other options and uses.

== Schools ==
The district operates two schools:

- Easton Valley Elementary School, Miles
- Easton Valley High School, Preston

=== Easton Valley High School ===
==== Athletics ====
The River Hawks participate in the Tri-Rivers Conference in the following sports:

- Football
- Cross Country
- Volleyball
- Basketball
- Wrestling
- Golf
- Track and Field
- Soccer
- Baseball
- Softball

== See also ==
- List of school districts in Iowa
- List of high schools in Iowa
