= Westover, Alabama =

City in Alabama, United States

- City
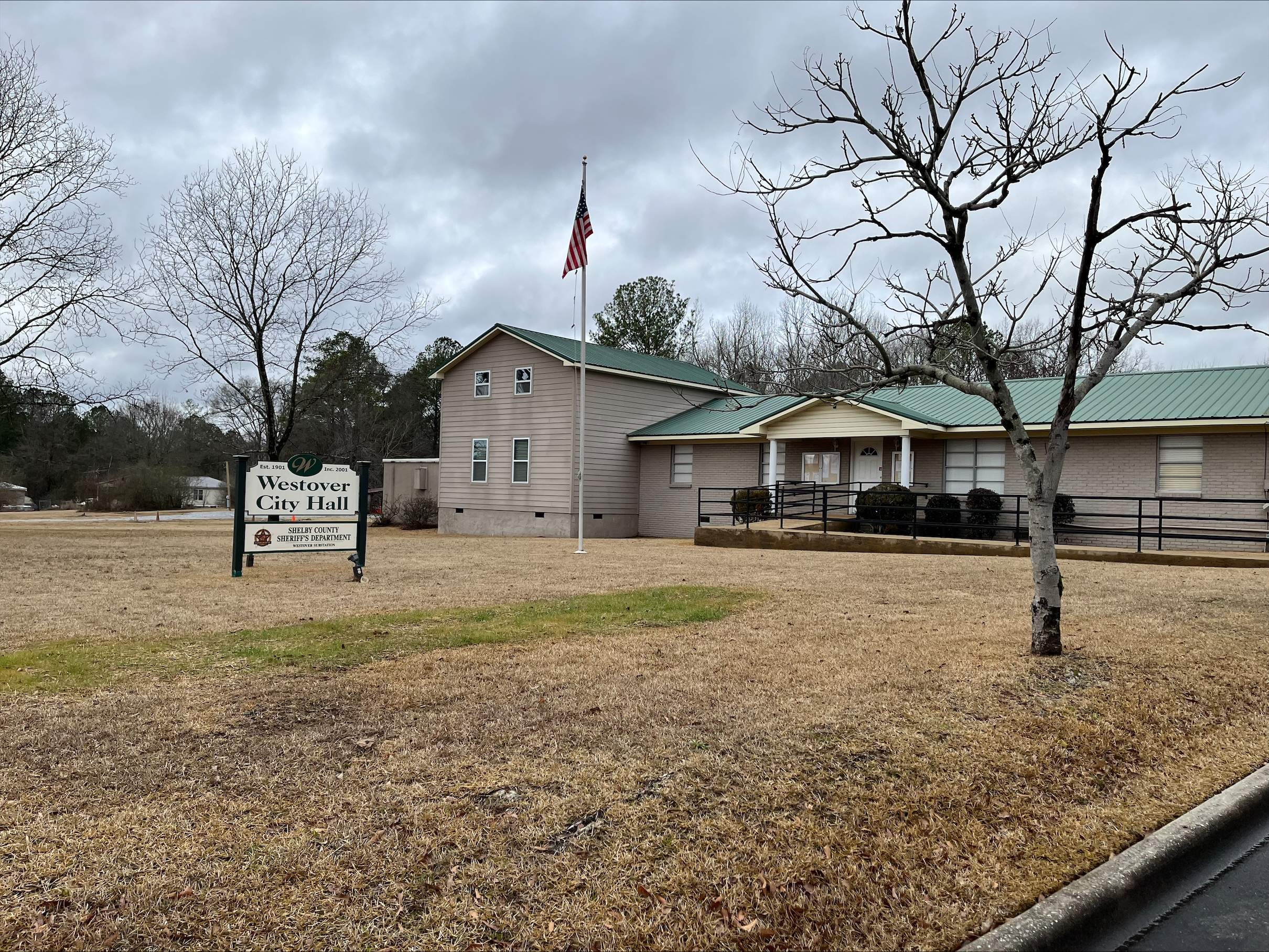
- Westover City Hall

- Location of Westover in Shelby County, Alabama.
- Coordinates: 33°22′38″N 86°30′53″W
- Country: United States
- State: Alabama
- County: Shelby
- Established: 1901

Government
  - Type: Mayor/Council

Area
  - Total: 19.88 sq mi (51.48 km^{2})
  - Land: 19.73 sq mi (51.09 km^{2})
  - Water: 0.15 sq mi (0.38 km^{2})
- Elevation: 499 ft (152 m)

Population (2020)
  - Total: 1,766
  - Density: 89.52/sq mi (34.56/km^{2})
- Time zone: UTC-6 (Central (CST))
  - Summer (DST): UTC-5 (CDT)
- ZIP code: 35147; 35185; 35043; 35186; 35051; 35078
- Area codes: 205, 659
- FIPS code: 01-81504
- GNIS feature ID: 2406871
- Website: www.westoveral.gov

Westover is a city in Shelby County, Alabama, United States. The city is part of the Birmingham Metropolitan Statistical Area. The city was officially incorporated on January 31, 2001, although it was established in 1901 and had a population of 961 when it was incorporated in 2001.

== History ==
One structure in Westover, the Archer House, is listed on the Alabama Register of Landmarks and Heritage.

== Geography ==
According to the U.S. Census Bureau, the city has a total area of 18.268 square miles (47.31 km^{2}), of which 18.14 square miles (47.0 km^{2}) is land and 0.128 square miles (0.33 km^{2}) is water.

Westover is located along the busy U.S. Highway 280 corridor in the northeastern quadrant of Shelby County. Via US 280, downtown Birmingham is 26 mi (42 km) northwest, and Harpersville is 5 mi (8 km) east. The Westover City Fire Department is rated a 3/3X by ISO.

Pine Mountain Preserve, the largest development of its kind ever built in the State of Alabama, is an Eddleman Properties development which has been announced. It is on 6,500 acres of property in the City of Westover including a "Town Center". The "Town Center" includes parks, City development sites (City Hall, Library, Fire Stations, etc.), multiple school sites and commercial.

== Education ==
The Shelby County School system covers the City of Westover as well as several area private schools. On July 19, 2011, the City Council passed a Resolution identifying multiple properties, within the Chelsea Area School Zone, available for donation to the Shelby County Board of Education.

== Demographics ==
Historical population
Census	Pop.	Note	%±
2010	1,275		—
2020	1,766		38.5%
U.S. Decennial Census; 2013 Estimate

The City of Westover has experienced significant growth over the last few years. The newest residential subdivisions in the City of Westover include Chelsea Square, Carden Crest, The Villages of Westover, Willow Oaks and Yellowleaf Farms. Over seventy-five percent on the property in the city is owned by residential and or commercial developers.

=== 2020 census ===
Westover city, Alabama – Racial and ethnic composition Note: the US Census treats Hispanic/Latino as an ethnic category. This table excludes Latinos from the racial categories and assigns them to a separate category. Hispanics/Latinos may be of any race.
Race / Ethnicity (NH = Non-Hispanic)	Pop 2010	Pop 2020	% 2010	% 2020
White alone (NH)	1,176	1,457	92.24%	82.50%
Black or African American alone (NH)	32	92	2.51%	5.21%
Native American or Alaska Native alone (NH)	10	9	0.78%	0.51%
Asian alone (NH)	6	6	0.47%	0.34%
Native Hawaiian or Pacific Islander alone (NH)	3	0	0.24%	0.00%
Other race alone (NH)	1	6	0.08%	0.34%
Mixed race or Multiracial (NH)	18	66	1.41%	3.74%
Hispanic or Latino (any race)	29	130	2.27%	7.36%
Total	1,275	1,766	100.00%	100.00%

== Government ==
Larry Riggins, a Westover resident since 1997, was elected mayor of the city in 2016 after many residents became distrustful of the former mayor J. Mark McLaughlin. Mayor Riggins served on the City Council for two terms prior to being elected as mayor. Former mayor J. Mark McLaughlin served as mayor from 2004 to 2016 and chaired the Planning Commission from 2002 to 2004.

== Notable person ==
- Jim Bragan, former college and minor league baseball player
- Matt Guerrier, former major league baseball pitcher

== Gallery ==
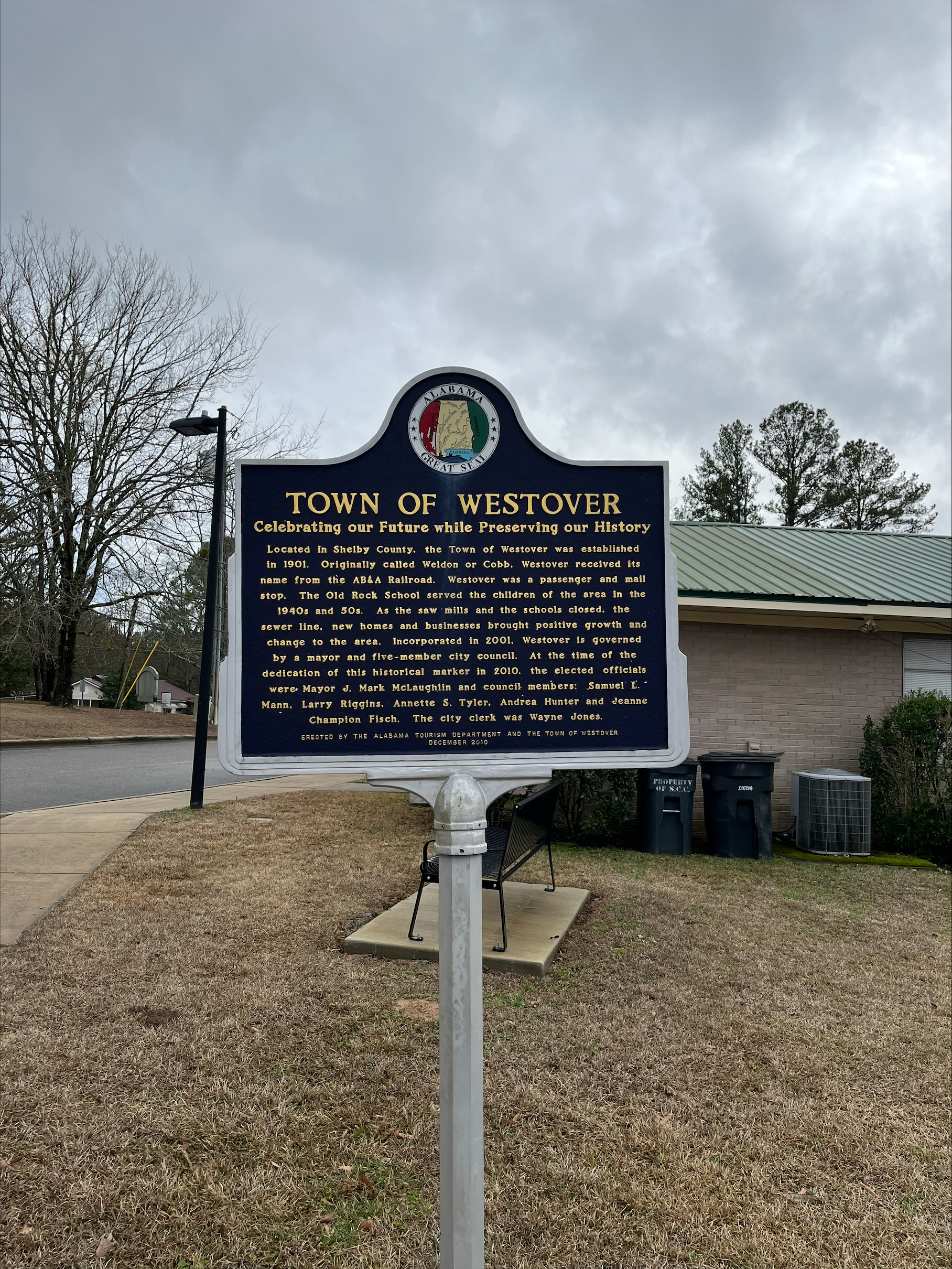
Westover historical marker

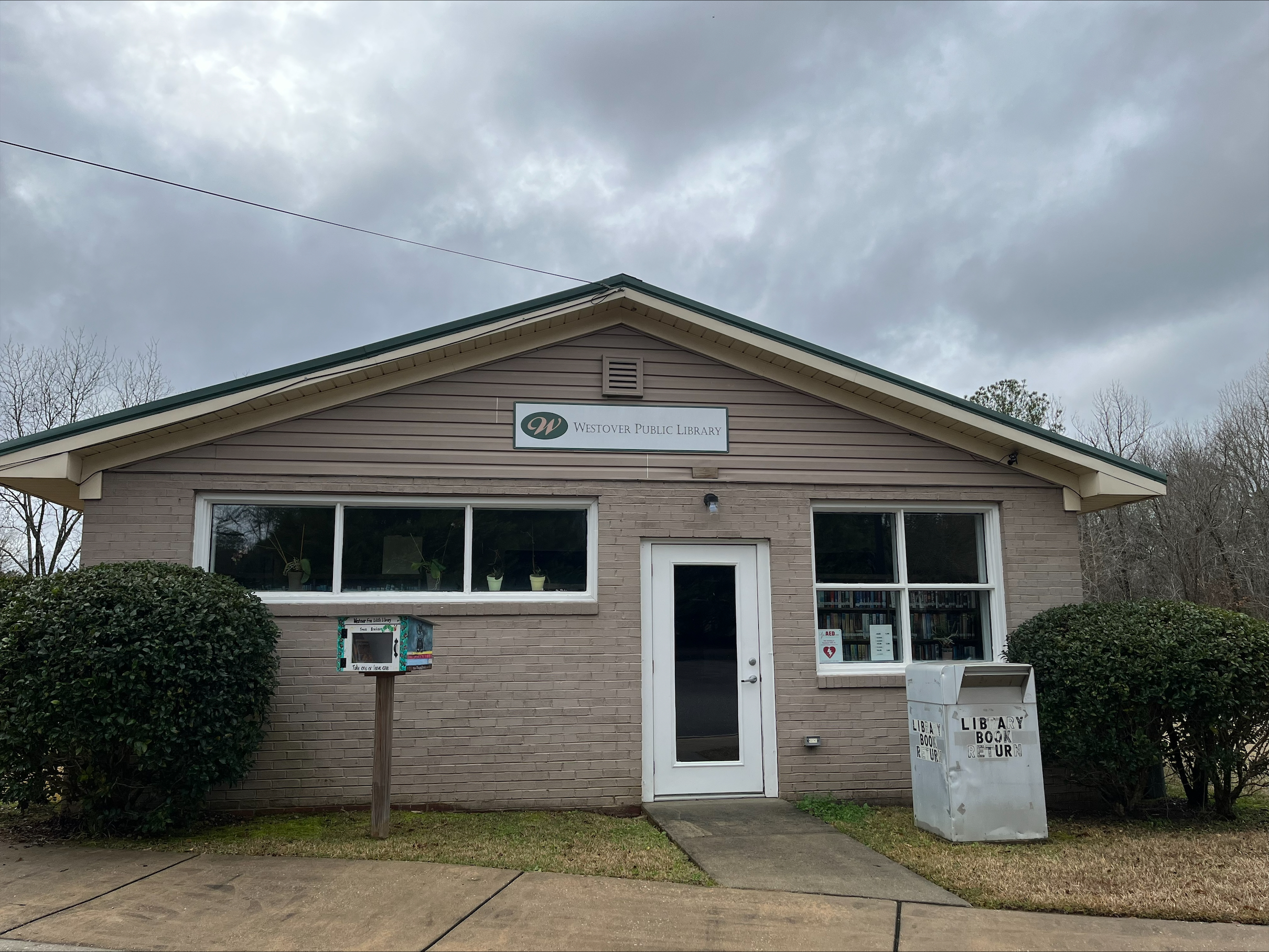
Westover Library

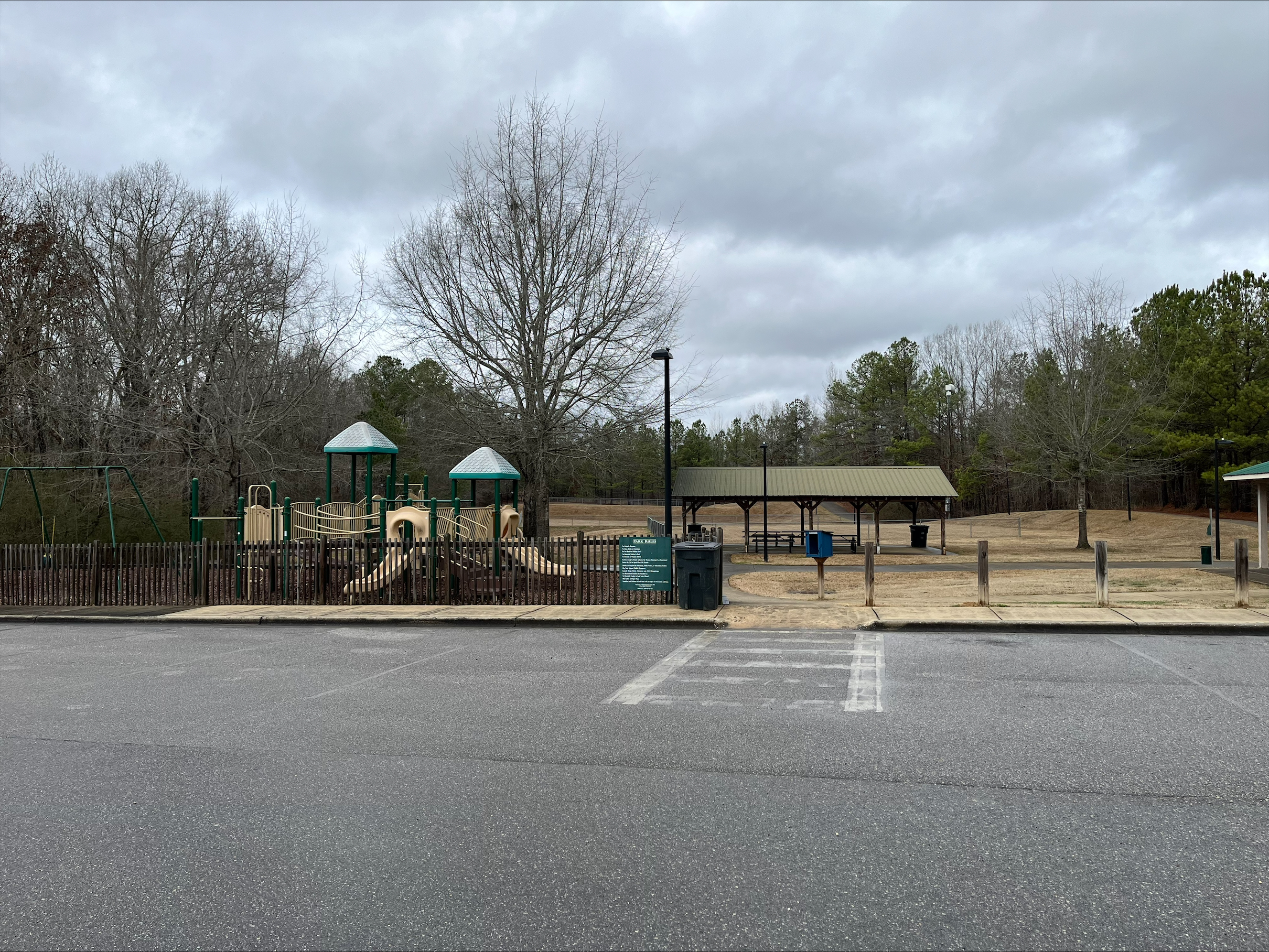
Westover City Park
