= Bob Oldis =

American baseball player and scout (1928–2025)

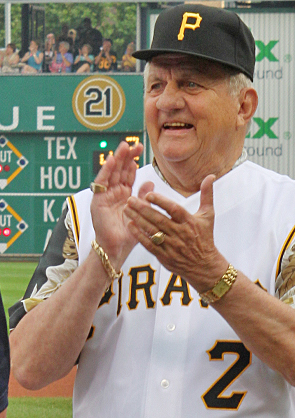
- Oldis at PNC Park in 2010
- Catcher
- Born: January 5, 1928; Preston, Iowa, U.S.
- Died: September 21, 2025 (aged 97); Gilbert, Arizona, U.S.
- Batted: Right Threw: Right

MLB debut
- April 28, 1953, for the Washington Senators

Last MLB appearance
- September 29, 1963, for the Philadelphia Phillies

MLB statistics
- Batting average: .237
- Home runs: 1
- Runs batted in: 22
- Stats at Baseball Reference

Teams
- Washington Senators (1953–1955); Pittsburgh Pirates (1960–1961); Philadelphia Phillies (1962–1963)

Career highlights and awards
- World Series champion (1960)

Robert Carl Oldis (January 5, 1928 – September 21, 2025) was an American scout for the Miami Marlins of Major League Baseball, as well as a professional baseball player and coach.

== Biography ==
Oldis was a catcher whose playing career lasted for 15 seasons, 1949–63. The native of Preston, Iowa, stood 6 feet 1 inch (1.85 m) tall and weighed 185 pounds (84 kg) and threw and batted right-handed during his active career. As a Major Leaguer, he appeared in 135 games as a second- or third-string receiver over all or parts of seven seasons (1953–55; 1960–63) with the Washington Senators, Pittsburgh Pirates and Philadelphia Phillies. He was a member of the 1960 World Series champion Pirates squad that beat the New York Yankees, serving as the club's third catcher behind Smoky Burgess and Hal Smith. Although he got into only 22 games during the 1960 season (three as a starting catcher), Oldis appeared in Games 4 and 5 of the World Series as a defensive replacement, spelling Burgess, but had no plate appearances. The Pirates won both contests, however, and went on to a seven-game upset on Bill Mazeroski's walk-off home run. Oldis' greatest number of games played was 47, in his final major league season.

For his MLB career, Oldis hit .237 with one home run—hit off Pete Richert of the Los Angeles Dodgers on August 9, 1962—along with 22 runs batted in and 56 hits. Following his playing career, he was a coach for the Phillies (1964–66), Minnesota Twins (1968) and Montreal Expos (1969), and scouted for the Phils and Expos. He was associated with the Marlins from 2002.

Oldis died in Gilbert, Arizona, on September 21, 2025, at the age of 97.

Preceded by Franchise established	Montreal Expos first base coach 1969	Succeeded by Jim Bragan
