= Jim Bragan =

- Coach
- Born: March 12, 1929; Birmingham, Alabama, U.S.
- Died: June 2, 2001 (aged 72); Westover, Alabama, U.S.
- Batted: Right Threw: Right
- Stats at Baseball Reference

Teams
- Cincinnati Reds (1967–1969); Montreal Expos (1970–1971; 1972); Mississippi State (1975); Milwaukee Brewers (1976–1977)

James Alton Bragan (March 12, 1929 – June 2, 2001) was an American infielder, manager and league president in American minor league baseball, a scout and coach at the Major League level, and a college baseball coach during a 40-plus year career in the game. He was the brother of MLB catcher, shortstop, manager and coach Bobby Bragan, also a minor league president.

Born in Birmingham, Alabama, Jimmy Bragan attended Mississippi State University and signed with the Brooklyn Dodgers in 1950. When his eight-year playing career ended, he became the manager of the Class D Bluefield Dodgers in 1957 and then joined the Cincinnati Reds organization as a scout. He remained a scout with the Reds through 1966 and then joined the major league club as first base coach from 1967–69 on the staff of Dave Bristol.

Bragan moved to the Montreal Expos in 1970, where he was first base coach through early 1971, and third base coach in 1972. He also was manager of the Expos' Triple-A Winnipeg Whips for the latter half of 1971, head baseball coach of Mississippi State University in 1975, and a coach with the Milwaukee Brewers in 1976–77. He was president of the Double-A Southern League from 1981–94, one of the most successful periods in that league's history. The league subsequently created the Jimmy Bragan Executive of the Year Award in his honor. In 1994 he was presented with the King of Baseball award given by Minor League Baseball.

Bragan died in Westover, Alabama, in 2001 at the age of 72.

== Baseball coaching record ==
Statistics overview
Season	Team	Overall	Conference	Standing	Postseason
Mississippi State Bulldogs (Southeastern Conference) (1909)
1975	Mississippi State	16–24	6–16	10th	NA
Mississippi State:		16–24 (.400)	6–16 (.273)		
Total:		16–24 (.400)			
National champion Postseason invitational champion Conference regular season champion Conference regular season and conference tournament champion Division regular season champion Division regular season and conference tournament champion Conference tournament champion

Preceded by Roy Sievers	Cincinnati Reds first-base coach 1967–1969	Succeeded by George Scherger
Preceded by Bob Oldis	Montreal Expos first-base coach 1970–1971	Succeeded by Larry Doby
Preceded by Don Zimmer	Montreal Expos third-base coach 1972	Succeeded by Dave Bristol
Preceded by Joe Nossek	Milwaukee Brewers third-base coach 1976–1977	Succeeded by Buck Rodgers
