= Onslow, Iowa =

- City
- Location of Onslow, Iowa
- Coordinates: 42°6′20″N 91°0′55″W
- Country: United States
- State: Iowa
- County: Jones

Area
  - Total: 0.19 sq mi (0.50 km^{2})
  - Land: 0.19 sq mi (0.50 km^{2})
  - Water: 0 sq mi (0.00 km^{2})
- Elevation: 920 ft (280 m)

Population (2020)
  - Total: 201
  - Density: 1,035.9/sq mi (399.97/km^{2})
- Time zone: UTC-6 (Central (CST))
  - Summer (DST): UTC-5 (CDT)
- ZIP code: 52321
- Area code: 563
- FIPS code: 19-59250
- GNIS feature ID: 0459871

Onslow is a city in Jones County, Iowa, United States. The population was 201 at the time of the 2020 census. It is part of the Cedar Rapids metropolitan area.

== History ==
Onslow was platted in 1871 by E. M. Franks.

== Geography ==
Onslow is located at 42°6′20″N 91°0′55″W (42.105603, -91.015158).

According to the United States Census Bureau, the city has a total area of 0.23 square miles (0.60 km^{2}), all land.

== Demographics ==
Historical populations
Year	Pop.	±%
1880	233	—
1890	237	+1.7%
1900	263	+11.0%
1910	207	−21.3%
1920	218	+5.3%
1930	210	−3.7%
1940	230	+9.5%
1950	244	+6.1%
1960	269	+10.2%
1970	253	−5.9%
1980	218	−13.8%
1990	216	−0.9%
2000	223	+3.2%
2010	197	−11.7%
2020	201	+2.0%
Source:"U.S. Census website". United States Census Bureau. and Iowa Data Center; Source: U.S. Decennial Census

=== 2020 census ===
As of the census of 2020, there were 201 people, 82 households, and 57 families residing in the city. The population density was 1,035.9 inhabitants per square mile (400.0/km^{2}). There were 101 housing units at an average density of 520.5 per square mile (201.0/km^{2}). The racial makeup of the city was 83.6% White, 5.0% Black or African American, 0.0% Native American, 0.0% Asian, 0.0% Pacific Islander, 0.0% from other races and 11.4% from two or more races. Hispanic or Latino persons of any race comprised 3.0% of the population.

Of the 82 households, 36.6% of which had children under the age of 18 living with them, 42.7% were married couples living together, 8.5% were cohabitating couples, 19.5% had a female householder with no spouse or partner present and 29.3% had a male householder with no spouse or partner present. 30.5% of all households were non-families. 28.0% of all households were made up of individuals, 11.0% had someone living alone who was 65 years old or older.

The median age in the city was 40.8 years. 29.4% of the residents were under the age of 20; 5.0% were between the ages of 20 and 24; 22.4% were from 25 and 44; 26.4% were from 45 and 64; and 16.9% were 65 years of age or older. The gender makeup of the city was 49.8% male and 50.2% female.

=== 2010 census ===
As of the census of 2010, there were 197 people, 94 households, and 52 families living in the city. The population density was 856.5 inhabitants per square mile (330.7/km^{2}). There were 109 housing units at an average density of 473.9 per square mile (183.0/km^{2}). The racial makeup of the city was 95.9% White, 2.5% African American, 0.5% Asian, and 1.0% from two or more races. Hispanic or Latino of any race were 1.0% of the population.

There were 94 households, of which 26.6% had children under the age of 18 living with them, 43.6% were married couples living together, 7.4% had a female householder with no husband present, 4.3% had a male householder with no wife present, and 44.7% were non-families. 39.4% of all households were made up of individuals, and 17% had someone living alone who was 65 years of age or older. The average household size was 2.10 and the average family size was 2.83.

The median age in the city was 42.9 years. 24.4% of residents were under the age of 18; 3.5% were between the ages of 18 and 24; 25.4% were from 25 to 44; 28.4% were from 45 to 64; and 18.3% were 65 years of age or older. The gender makeup of the city was 46.7% male and 53.3% female.

=== 2000 census ===
As of the census of 2000, there were 223 people, 96 households, and 60 families living in the city. The population density was 965.4 inhabitants per square mile (372.7/km^{2}). There were 107 housing units at an average density of 463.2 per square mile (178.8/km^{2}). The racial makeup of the city was 99.55% White, and 0.45% from two or more races.

There were 96 households, out of which 25.0% had children under the age of 18 living with them, 54.2% were married couples living together, 7.3% had a female householder with no husband present, and 37.5% were non-families. 33.3% of all households were made up of individuals, and 22.9% had someone living alone who was 65 years of age or older. The average household size was 2.32 and the average family size was 3.02.

In the city, the population was spread out, with 27.4% under the age of 18, 5.4% from 18 to 24, 25.1% from 25 to 44, 16.6% from 45 to 64, and 25.6% who were 65 years of age or older. The median age was 38 years. For every 100 females, there were 82.8 males. For every 100 females age 18 and over, there were 82.0 males.

The median income for a household in the city was $24,375, and the median income for a family was $34,500. Males had a median income of $30,625 versus $20,375 for females. The per capita income for the city was $11,916. About 15.4% of families and 19.4% of the population were below the poverty line, including 26.5% of those under the age of eighteen and 21.6% of those 65 or over.

== Education ==
Onslow is within the Midland Community School District.
