= Miles, Iowa =

- City
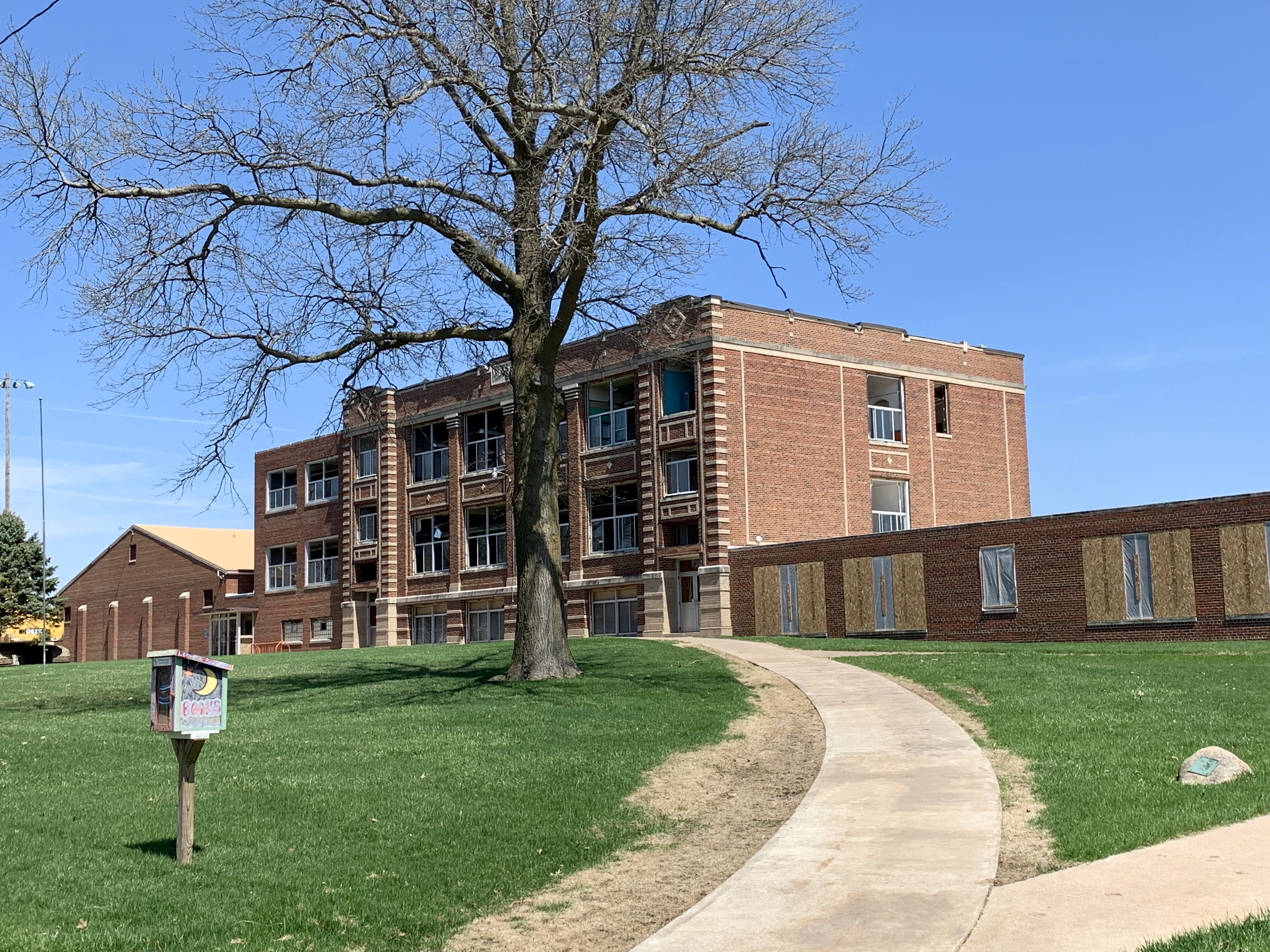
- The original Miles School building prior to its partial demolition in 2019, making way for a new Easton Valley Elementary School.

- Location of Miles, Iowa
- Coordinates: 42°02′53″N 90°18′48″W
- Country: United States
- State: Iowa
- County: Jackson
- Incorporated: May 4, 1893

Area
  - Total: 1.26 sq mi (3.27 km^{2})
  - Land: 1.26 sq mi (3.27 km^{2})
  - Water: 0 sq mi (0.00 km^{2})
- Elevation: 807 ft (246 m)

Population (2020)
  - Total: 408
  - Density: 322.8/sq mi (124.65/km^{2})
- Time zone: UTC-6 (Central (CST))
  - Summer (DST): UTC-5 (CDT)
- ZIP code: 52064
- Area code: 563
- FIPS code: 19-52050
- GNIS feature ID: 2395323
- Website: www.milesiowa.org

Miles is a small city in southeastern Jackson County, Iowa, United States. The population was 408 at the time of the 2020 census.

== History ==
In 1870, Miles was founded in anticipation of a railroad which would be built through the territory. The town was named for its founder, F. M. Miles.

In 1871, Miles was formally laid out, with the first house being built the following year, in 1872.

== Geography ==
According to the United States Census Bureau, the city has a total area of 1.15 square miles (2.98 km^{2}; 297.85 ha), all land.

== Demographics ==
Historical populations
Year	Pop.	±%
1900	385	—
1910	334	−13.2%
1920	333	−0.3%
1930	319	−4.2%
1940	314	−1.6%
1950	344	+9.6%
1960	376	+9.3%
1970	409	+8.8%
1980	398	−2.7%
1990	409	+2.8%
2000	462	+13.0%
2010	445	−3.7%
2020	408	−8.3%
Source:"U.S. Census website". United States Census Bureau. and Iowa Data Center; Source: U.S. Decennial Census

=== 2020 census ===
As of the census of 2020, there were 408 people, 183 households, and 114 families residing in the city. The population density was 322.8 inhabitants per square mile (124.7/km^{2}). There were 197 housing units at an average density of 155.9 per square mile (60.2/km^{2}). The racial makeup of the city was 96.3% White, 0.7% Black or African American, 0.0% Native American, 0.0% Asian, 0.0% Pacific Islander, 0.2% from other races and 2.7% from two or more races. Hispanic or Latino persons of any race comprised 0.2% of the population.

Of the 183 households, 26.8% of which had children under the age of 18 living with them, 47.5% were married couples living together, 6.6% were cohabitating couples, 23.0% had a female householder with no spouse or partner present and 23.0% had a male householder with no spouse or partner present. 37.7% of all households were non-families. 35.0% of all households were made up of individuals, 13.7% had someone living alone who was 65 years old or older.

The median age in the city was 44.5 years. 23.0% of the residents were under the age of 20; 5.1% were between the ages of 20 and 24; 22.8% were from 25 and 44; 29.4% were from 45 and 64; and 19.6% were 65 years of age or older. The gender makeup of the city was 52.0% male and 48.0% female.

=== 2010 census ===
As of the census of 2010, 445 people, 184 households, and 122 families were residing in the city. The population density was 387.0 inhabitants per square mile (149.4/km^{2}). There were 195 housing units at an average density of 169.6 per square mile (65.5/km^{2}). The racial makeup of the city was 97.5% White, 0.4% African American, 0.4% Native American, and 1.6% from two or more races. Hispanic or Latino of any race were 1.8% of the population.

Of a total of 184 households, 33.7% had children under the age of 18 living with them, 54.3% were married couples living together, 6.5% had a female householder with no husband present, 5.4% had a male householder with no wife present, and 33.7% were non-families. 32.1% of all households were made up of individuals, and 13.5% had someone living alone who was 65 years of age or older. The average household size was 2.42 and the average family size was 3.02.

The median age in the city was 42.6 years. 26.5% of residents were under the age of 18; 6.1% were between the ages of 18 and 24; 20.2% were from 25 to 44; 30.5% were from 45 to 64; and 16.6% were 65 years of age or older. The gender makeup of the city was 50.1% male and 49.9% female.

=== 2000 census ===
As of the census of 2000, there were 462 people, 179 households, and 121 families residing in the city. The population density was 402.7 inhabitants per square mile (155.5/km^{2}). There were 184 housing units at an average density of 160.4 per square mile (61.9/km^{2}). The racial makeup of the city was 98.27% White, 0.87% Native American, and 0.87% from two or more races.

Out of a total of 179 households, 38.0% had children under the age of 18 living with them, 57.0% were married couples living together, 6.7% had a female householder with no husband present, and 32.4% were non-families. 29.6% of all households were made up of individuals, and 14.5% had someone living alone who was 65 years of age or older. The average household size was 2.58 and the average family size was 3.26.

In the city, the population was spread out, with 31.6% under the age of 18, 5.6% from 18 to 24, 27.1% from 25 to 44, 20.8% from 45 to 64, and 14.9% who were 65 years of age or older. The median age was 36 years. For every 100 females, there were 89.3 males. For every 100 females age 18 and over, there were 97.5 males.

The median income for a household in the city was $33,036, and the median income for a family was $42,188. Males had a median income of $36,042 versus $24,375 for females. The per capita income for the city was US$17,005. About 9.3% of families and 10.1% of the population were below the poverty line, including 13.3% of those under age 18 and none of those age 65 or over.

== Education ==
Miles is within the Easton Valley Community School District, formed in 2013 by the merger of the East Central Community School District and the Preston Community School District. East Central formed in 1974 by the merger of the Miles Community School District and the Sabula Community School District.

At one point, the former East Central district entered into a grade-sharing relationship with the Northeast Community School District, in that East Central residents attended Northeast secondary schools.

On September 11, 2012, the East Central School and Preston School districts held a special vote to determine whether or not to merge their school districts. The Preston School district voted 86.5% in favor of the merger, and after a recount showed a slimmer but still passing margin of 620 East Central votes for and 598 against, the communities created the new Easton Valley School District (EVSD).

The EVSD elementary schools are now located in Miles, while the middle and high schools are in Preston.
