= Oxford Junction, Iowa =

- City
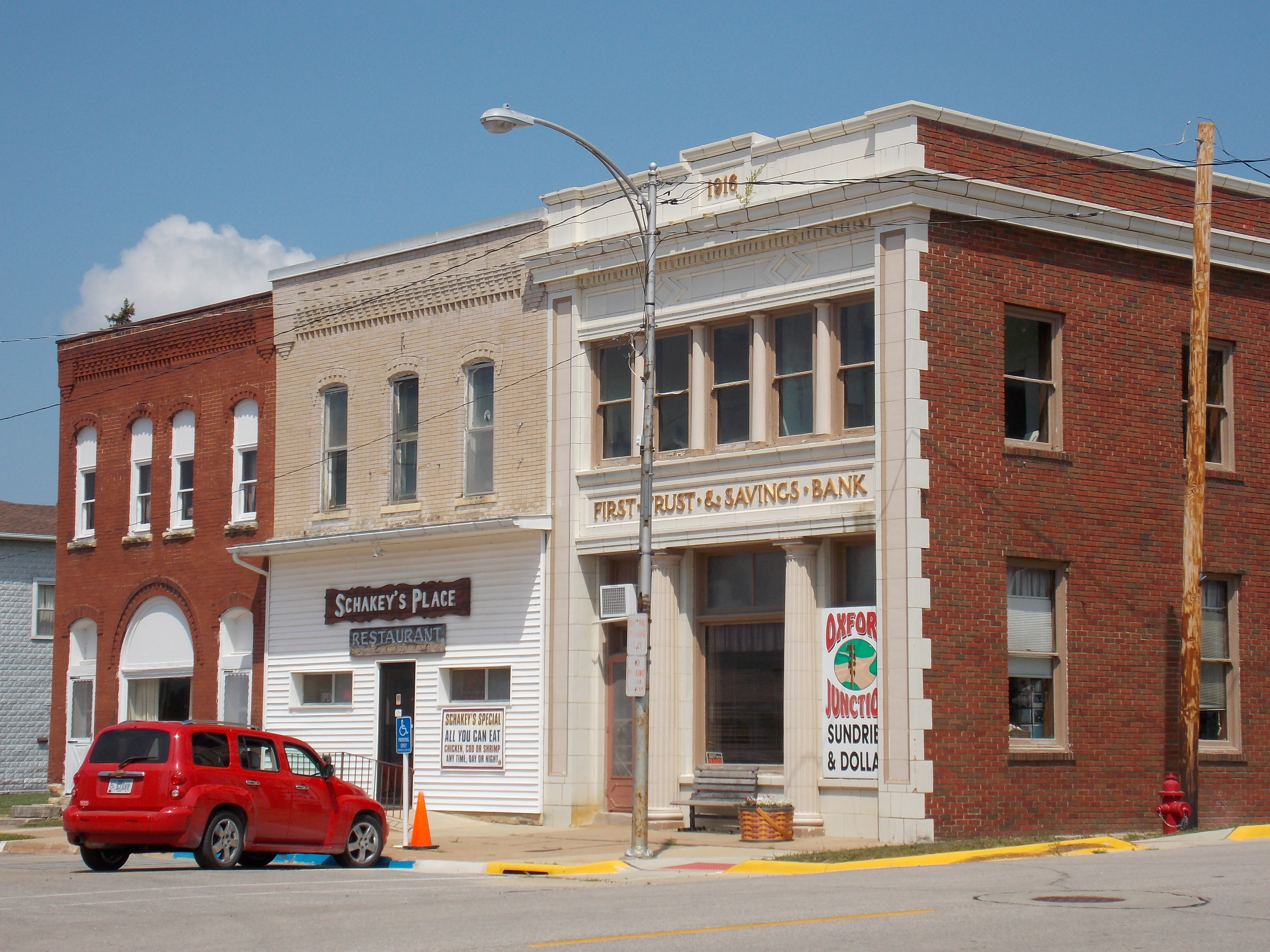
- Downtown Oxford Junction
- Motto: "The junction of opportunity"
- Location of Oxford Junction, Iowa
- Coordinates: 41°59′00″N 90°57′16″W
- Country: United States
- State: Iowa
- County: Jones

Area
  - Total: 0.65 sq mi (1.68 km^{2})
  - Land: 0.65 sq mi (1.68 km^{2})
  - Water: 0 sq mi (0.00 km^{2})
- Elevation: 732 ft (223 m)

Population (2020)
  - Total: 424
  - Density: 654.4/sq mi (252.67/km^{2})
- Time zone: UTC-6 (Central (CST))
  - Summer (DST): UTC-5 (CDT)
- ZIP code: 52323
- Area code: 563
- FIPS code: 19-60690
- GNIS feature ID: 0459977
- Website: www.cityofoxfordjunction.com

Oxford Junction is a city in Jones County, Iowa, United States. The population was 424 at the time of the 2020 census. It is part of the Cedar Rapids Metropolitan Statistical Area.

== History ==
Oxford Junction was platted in 1871, at the time the now-defunct railroad was built. The town is named for its location at the junction of two branches of the Chicago, Milwaukee, St. Paul and Pacific Railroad.

== Geography ==
Oxford Junction is located at 41°59′00″N 90°57′16″W (41.983203, -90.954480).

According to the United States Census Bureau, the city has a total area of 0.69 square miles (1.79 km^{2}), all land.

== Demographics ==
Historical populations
Year	Pop.	±%
1880	349	—
1890	752	+115.5%
1900	780	+3.7%
1910	822	+5.4%
1920	807	−1.8%
1930	759	−5.9%
1940	705	−7.1%
1950	663	−6.0%
1960	725	+9.4%
1970	666	−8.1%
1980	600	−9.9%
1990	581	−3.2%
2000	573	−1.4%
2010	496	−13.4%
2020	424	−14.5%
Source:"U.S. Census website". United States Census Bureau. and Iowa Data Center; Source: U.S. Decennial Census

=== 2020 census ===
As of the census of 2020, there were 424 people, 190 households, and 105 families residing in the city. The population density was 654.4 inhabitants per square mile (252.7/km^{2}). There were 232 housing units at an average density of 358.1 per square mile (138.3/km^{2}). The racial makeup of the city was 96.5% White, 0.0% Black or African American, 0.5% Native American, 0.0% Asian, 0.0% Pacific Islander, 0.7% from other races and 2.4% from two or more races. Hispanic or Latino persons of any race comprised 1.7% of the population.

Of the 190 households, 24.2% of which had children under the age of 18 living with them, 40.5% were married couples living together, 3.7% were cohabitating couples, 28.9% had a female householder with no spouse or partner present and 26.8% had a male householder with no spouse or partner present. 44.7% of all households were non-families. 41.1% of all households were made up of individuals, 25.3% had someone living alone who was 65 years old or older.

The median age in the city was 45.6 years. 25.5% of the residents were under the age of 20; 2.1% were between the ages of 20 and 24; 21.7% were from 25 and 44; 29.2% were from 45 and 64; and 21.5% were 65 years of age or older. The gender makeup of the city was 51.7% male and 48.3% female.

=== 2010 census ===
At the 2010 census there were 496 people, 223 households, and 141 families living in the city. The population density was 718.8 inhabitants per square mile (277.5/km^{2}). There were 262 housing units at an average density of 379.7 per square mile (146.6/km^{2}). The racial makup of the city was 99.0% White, 0.6% Native American, and 0.4% Asian. Of the 223 households 26.0% had children under the age of 18 living with them, 46.2% were married couples living together, 13.0% had a female householder with no husband present, 4.0% had a male householder with no wife present, and 36.8% were non-families. 31.8% of households were one person and 18.4% were one person aged 65 or older. The average household size was 2.22 and the average family size was 2.75.

The median age was 45.5 years. 22.2% of residents were under the age of 18; 7.4% were between the ages of 18 and 24; 19% were from 25 to 44; 29.2% were from 45 to 64; and 22.2% were 65 or older. The gender makeup of the city was 50.0% male and 50.0% female.

=== 2000 census ===
At the 2000 census there were 573 people, 236 households, and 151 families living in the city. The population density was 813.3 inhabitants per square mile (314.0/km^{2}). There were 264 housing units at an average density of 374.7 per square mile (144.7/km^{2}). The racial makup of the city was 98.95% White, 0.17% Native American, 0.17% Asian, and 0.70% from two or more races. Hispanic or Latino of any race were 0.17%.

Of the 236 households 33.5% had children under the age of 18 living with them, 50.4% were married couples living together, 7.6% had a female householder with no husband present, and 36.0% were non-families. 32.6% of households were one person and 22.9% were one person aged 65 or older. The average household size was 2.43 and the average family size was 3.09.

The age distribution was 27.2% under the age of 18, 8.0% from 18 to 24, 24.1% from 25 to 44, 19.7% from 45 to 64, and 20.9% 65 or older. The median age was 39 years. For every 100 females, there were 89.1 males. For every 100 females age 18 and over, there were 84.5 males.

The median household income was $30,417 and the median family income was $35,625. Males had a median income of $26,875 versus $17,333 for females. The per capita income for the city was $13,805. About 18.5% of families and 18.9% of the population were below the poverty line, including 24.0% of those under age 18 and 12.1% of those age 65 or over.

== Education ==
It is within the Midland Community School District and hosts the district's sole elementary school. The Oxford Junction district merged into the Midland district on July 1, 1995.
