= Spragueville, Iowa =

- City
- Location of Spragueville, Iowa
- Coordinates: 42°04′18″N 90°25′58″W
- Country: United States
- State: Iowa
- County: Jackson
- Incorporated: May 18, 1912

Area
  - Total: 0.75 sq mi (1.93 km^{2})
  - Land: 0.75 sq mi (1.93 km^{2})
  - Water: 0 sq mi (0.00 km^{2})
- Elevation: 643 ft (196 m)

Population (2020)
  - Total: 92
  - Density: 123.7/sq mi (47.76/km^{2})
- Time zone: UTC-6 (Central (CST))
  - Summer (DST): UTC-5 (CDT)
- ZIP code: 52074
- Area code: 563
- FIPS code: 19-74460
- GNIS feature ID: 2395930

Spragueville is a city in Jackson County, Iowa, United States. The population was 92 at the time of the 2020 census.

== History ==
Spragueville is named for an early settler called Sprague, who arrived there in 1841 and established a gristmill.

== Geography ==
According to the United States Census Bureau, the city has a total area of 0.67 square miles (1.74 km^{2}), all land.

== Demographics ==
Historical populations
Year	Pop.	±%
1920	102	—
1930	86	−15.7%
1940	116	+34.9%
1950	115	−0.9%
1960	100	−13.0%
1970	112	+12.0%
1980	149	+33.0%
1990	118	−20.8%
2000	89	−24.6%
2010	81	−9.0%
2020	92	+13.6%
Source:"U.S. Census website". United States Census Bureau. and Iowa Data Center; Source: U.S. Decennial Census

=== 2020 census ===
As of the census of 2020, there were 92 people, 38 households, and 23 families residing in the city. The population density was 123.7 inhabitants per square mile (47.8/km^{2}). There were 44 housing units at an average density of 59.2 per square mile (22.8/km^{2}). The racial makeup of the city was 95.7% White, 0.0% Black or African American, 0.0% Native American, 0.0% Asian, 0.0% Pacific Islander, 0.0% from other races and 4.3% from two or more races. Hispanic or Latino persons of any race comprised 3.3% of the population.

Of the 38 households, 28.9% of which had children under the age of 18 living with them, 34.2% were married couples living together, 5.3% were cohabitating couples, 23.7% had a female householder with no spouse or partner present and 36.8% had a male householder with no spouse or partner present. 39.5% of all households were non-families. 31.6% of all households were made up of individuals, 15.8% had someone living alone who was 65 years old or older.

The median age in the city was 36.0 years. 28.3% of the residents were under the age of 20; 2.2% were between the ages of 20 and 24; 29.3% were from 25 and 44; 21.7% were from 45 and 64; and 18.5% were 65 years of age or older. The gender makeup of the city was 55.4% male and 44.6% female.

=== 2010 census ===
As of the census of 2010, there were 81 people, 37 households, and 20 families living in the city. The population density was 120.9 inhabitants per square mile (46.7/km^{2}). There were 46 housing units at an average density of 68.7 per square mile (26.5/km^{2}). The racial makeup of the city was 100.0% White. Hispanic or Latino of any race were 2.5% of the population.

There were 37 households, of which 21.6% had children under the age of 18 living with them, 37.8% were married couples living together, 13.5% had a female householder with no husband present, 2.7% had a male householder with no wife present, and 45.9% were non-families. 40.5% of all households were made up of individuals, and 21.6% had someone living alone who was 65 years of age or older. The average household size was 2.19 and the average family size was 3.05.

The median age in the city was 39.8 years. 25.9% of residents were under the age of 18; 6.1% were between the ages of 18 and 24; 27.1% were from 25 to 44; 20.9% were from 45 to 64; and 19.8% were 65 years of age or older. The gender makeup of the city was 56.8% male and 43.2% female.

=== 2000 census ===
As of the census of 2000, there were 89 people, 42 households, and 29 families living in the city. The population density was 133.8 inhabitants per square mile (51.7/km^{2}). There were 43 housing units at an average density of 64.7 per square mile (25.0/km^{2}). The racial makeup of the city was 97.75% White, 1.12% Native American, and 1.12% from two or more races. Hispanic or Latino of any race were 2.25% of the population.

There were 42 households, out of which 19.0% had children under the age of 18 living with them, 45.2% were married couples living together, 19.0% had a female householder with no husband present, and 28.6% were non-families. 26.2% of all households were made up of individuals, and 14.3% had someone living alone who was 65 years of age or older. The average household size was 2.12 and the average family size was 2.53.

In the city, the population was spread out, with 15.7% under the age of 18, 13.5% from 18 to 24, 19.1% from 25 to 44, 27.0% from 45 to 64, and 24.7% who were 65 years of age or older. The median age was 48 years. For every 100 females, there were 107.0 males. For every 100 females age 18 and over, there were 92.3 males.

The median income for a household in the city was $28,750, and the median income for a family was $24,688. Males had a median income of $28,125 versus $28,750 for females. The per capita income for the city was $14,906. There were 16.0% of families and 15.9% of the population living below the poverty line, including 18.2% of under eighteens and 55.6% of those over 64.

== Education ==
Spragueville is a part of the Easton Valley Community School District, formed in 2013 by the merger of the East Central Community School District and the Preston Community School District.
