= Wyoming, Iowa =

- City
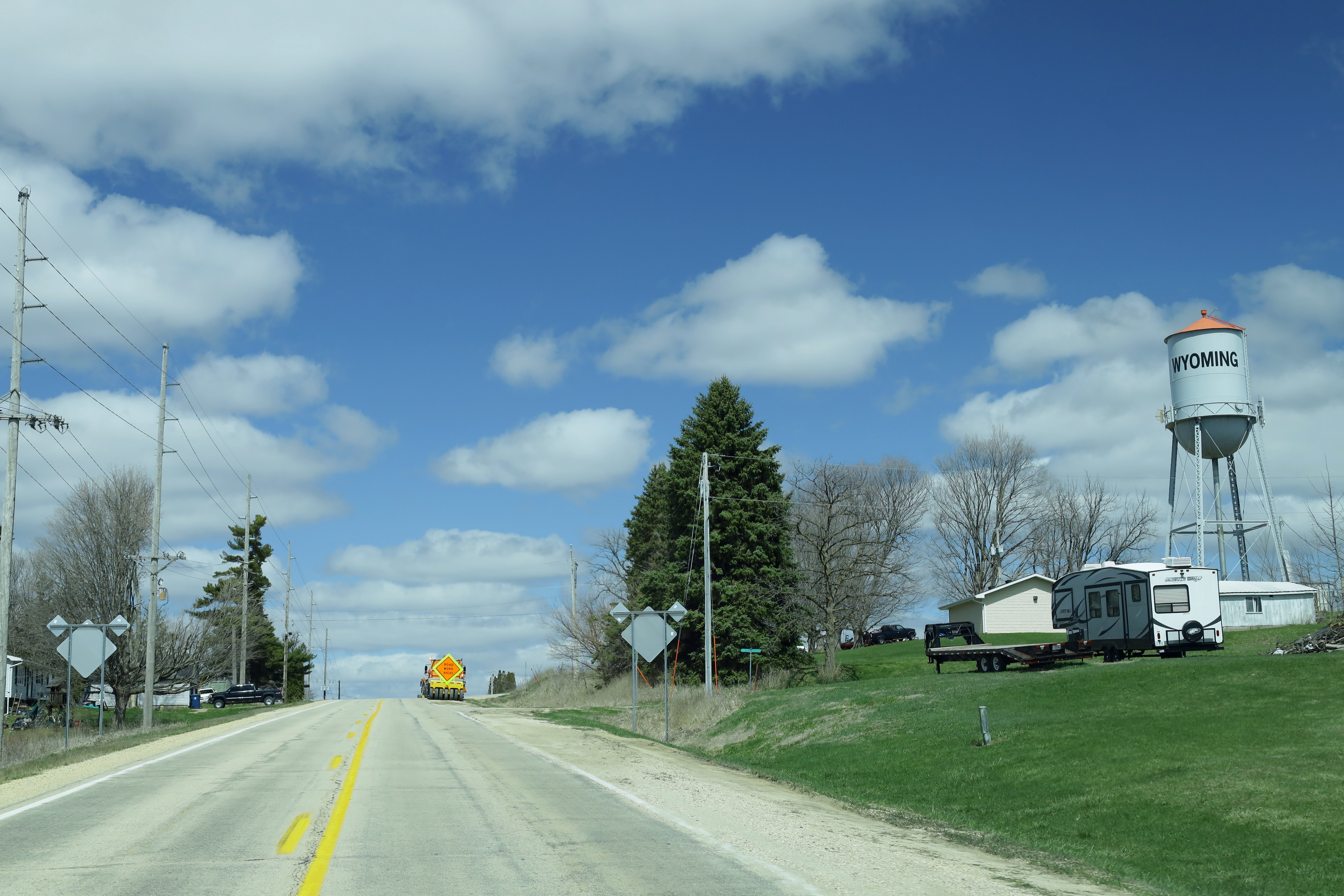
- Wyoming water tower along IA 136
- Nickname: "Christmas City"
- Location of Wyoming, Iowa
- Coordinates: 42°3′33″N 91°0′18″W
- Country: United States
- State: Iowa
- County: Jones

Area
  - Total: 0.49 sq mi (1.26 km^{2})
  - Land: 0.49 sq mi (1.26 km^{2})
  - Water: 0 sq mi (0.00 km^{2})
- Elevation: 817 ft (249 m)

Population (2020)
  - Total: 523
  - Density: 1,078.4/sq mi (416.38/km^{2})
- Time zone: UTC-6 (Central (CST))
  - Summer (DST): UTC-5 (CDT)
- ZIP code: 52362
- Area code: 563
- FIPS code: 19-87240
- GNIS feature ID: 0463225
- Website: Wyoming, Iowa

Wyoming is a city in Jones County, Iowa, United States. The population was 523 at the time of the 2020 census. It is part of the Cedar Rapids Metropolitan Statistical Area.

== History ==
Wyoming was incorporated on October 21, 1873, and was named for Wyoming County, New York.

== Geography ==
Wyoming is located at 42°3′33″N 91°0′18″W (42.059187, -91.004985).

According to the United States Census Bureau, the city has a total area of 0.51 square miles (1.32 km^{2}), all land.

== Demographics ==
Historical populations
Year	Pop.	±%
1880	729	—
1890	704	−3.4%
1900	794	+12.8%
1910	733	−7.7%
1920	690	−5.9%
1930	634	−8.1%
1940	656	+3.5%
1950	724	+10.4%
1960	797	+10.1%
1970	746	−6.4%
1980	702	−5.9%
1990	659	−6.1%
2000	626	−5.0%
2010	515	−17.7%
2020	523	+1.6%
Source:"U.S. Census website". United States Census Bureau. and Iowa Data Center; Source: U.S. Decennial Census

=== 2020 census ===
As of the census of 2020, there were 523 people, 230 households, and 132 families residing in the city. The population density was 1,078.4 inhabitants per square mile (416.4/km^{2}). There were 274 housing units at an average density of 565.0 per square mile (218.1/km^{2}). The racial makeup of the city was 96.4% White, 0.8% Black or African American, 0.0% Native American, 0.0% Asian, 0.0% Pacific Islander, 0.2% from other races and 2.7% from two or more races. Hispanic or Latino persons of any race comprised 0.4% of the population.

Of the 230 households, 27.4% of which had children under the age of 18 living with them, 41.3% were married couples living together, 7.0% were cohabitating couples, 33.0% had a female householder with no spouse or partner present and 18.7% had a male householder with no spouse or partner present. 42.6% of all households were non-families. 35.2% of all households were made up of individuals, 19.1% had someone living alone who was 65 years old or older.

The median age in the city was 42.2 years. 26.6% of the residents were under the age of 20; 3.6% were between the ages of 20 and 24; 23.9% were from 25 and 44; 28.5% were from 45 and 64; and 17.4% were 65 years of age or older. The gender makeup of the city was 49.3% male and 50.7% female.

=== 2010 census ===
At the 2010 census there were 515 people, 243 households, and 136 families living in the city. The population density was 1,009.8 inhabitants per square mile (389.9/km^{2}). There were 283 housing units at an average density of 554.9 per square mile (214.2/km^{2}). The racial makup of the city was 99.0% White, 0.6% Native American, and 0.4% from two or more races. Hispanic or Latino of any race were 1.2%.

Of the 243 households 25.5% had children under the age of 18 living with them, 44.4% were married couples living together, 7.0% had a female householder with no husband present, 4.5% had a male householder with no wife present, and 44.0% were non-families. 38.3% of households were one person and 20.1% were one person aged 65 or older. The average household size was 2.12 and the average family size was 2.80.

The median age was 44.9 years. 21.6% of residents were under the age of 18; 5.4% were between the ages of 18 and 24; 23% were from 25 to 44; 29.5% were from 45 to 64; and 20.4% were 65 or older. The gender makeup of the city was 50.5% male and 49.5% female.

=== 2000 census ===
At the 2000 census there were 626 people, 277 households, and 173 families living in the city. The population density was 1,230.4 inhabitants per square mile (475.1/km^{2}). There were 298 housing units at an average density of 585.7 per square mile (226.1/km^{2}). The racial makup of the city was 98.56% White, 0.64% African American, 0.32% Native American, and 0.48% from two or more races. Hispanic or Latino of any race were 0.16%.

Of the 277 households 29.2% had children under the age of 18 living with them, 50.5% were married couples living together, 9.7% had a female householder with no husband present, and 37.5% were non-families. 35.4% of households were one person and 21.7% were one person aged 65 or older. The average household size was 2.26 and the average family size was 2.91.

The age distribution was 26.4% under the age of 18, 6.4% from 18 to 24, 26.5% from 25 to 44, 19.3% from 45 to 64, and 21.4% 65 or older. The median age was 39 years. For every 100 females, there were 86.3 males. For every 100 females age 18 and over, there were 82.9 males.

The median household income was $31,979 and the median family income was $41,538. Males had a median income of $30,938 versus $23,611 for females. The per capita income for the city was $15,787. About 10.6% of families and 12.2% of the population were below the poverty line, including 18.8% of those under age 18 and 9.7% of those age 65 or over.

== Education ==
It is within the Midland Community School District and is the location of the school district's only secondary school.

== Notable people ==
- Daniel Mary Gorman (1861–1927), clergyman of the Roman Catholic Church; born in Wyoming
- Dutch Levsen (1898–1972), Former pitcher for the Cleveland Indians; born in Wyoming
- Orson Lowell (1871–1956), magazine illustrator, born in Wyoming
