= Sabula, Iowa =

- City
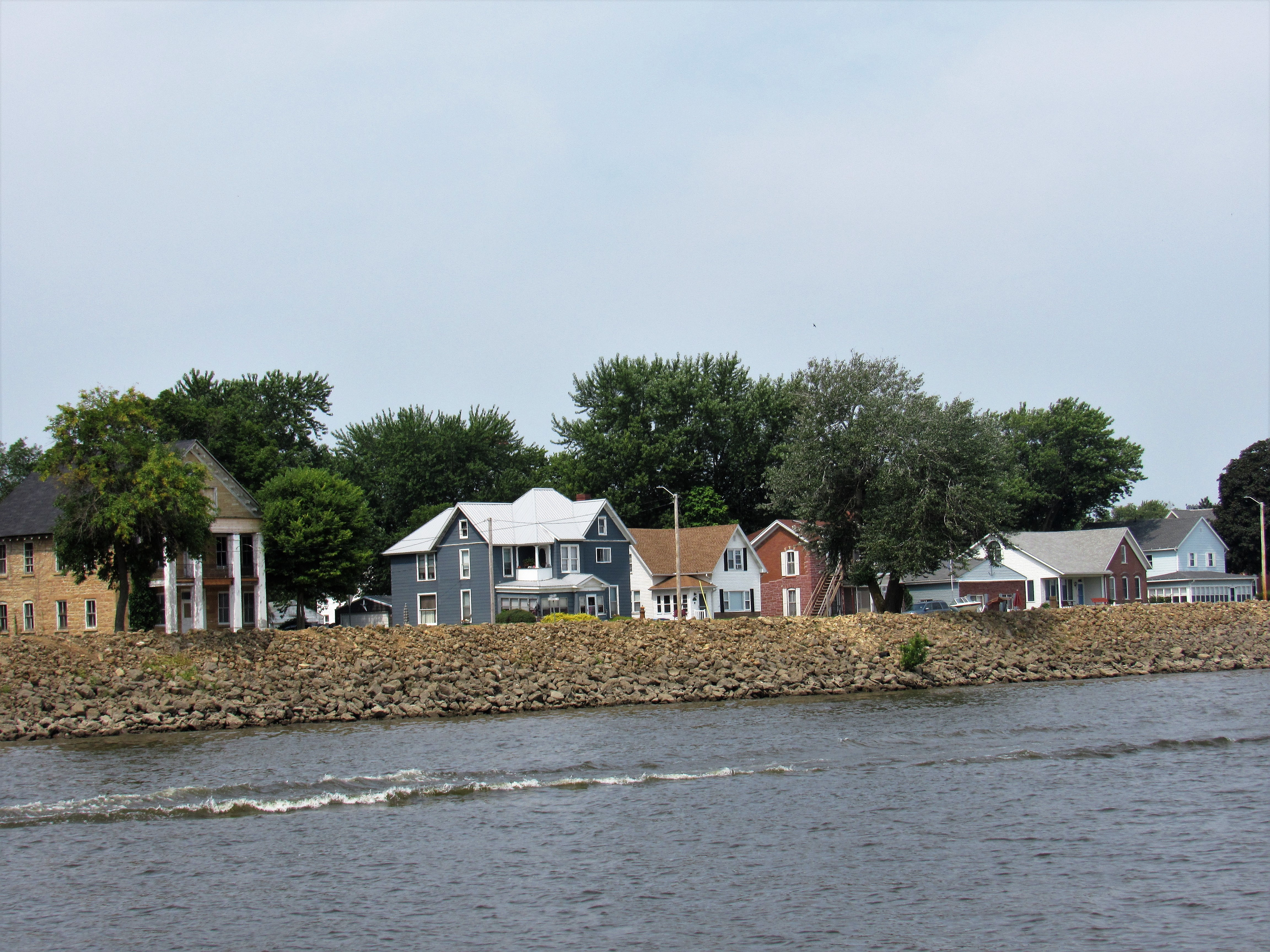
- Sabula, Iowa from the Mississippi River

- Location of Sabula, Iowa
- Coordinates: 42°04′00″N 90°10′36″W
- Country: United States
- State: Iowa
- County: Jackson
- Incorporated: September 1864

Area
  - Total: 1.46 sq mi (3.77 km^{2})
  - Land: 0.49 sq mi (1.28 km^{2})
  - Water: 0.96 sq mi (2.49 km^{2})
- Elevation: 581 ft (177 m)

Population (2020)
  - Total: 506
  - Density: 1,023.6/sq mi (395.21/km^{2})
- Time zone: UTC-6 (Central (CST))
  - Summer (DST): UTC-5 (CDT)
- ZIP code: 52070
- Area code: 563
- FIPS code: 19-69510
- GNIS feature ID: 2396465
- Website: sabulaia.com

Sabula is a city in Jackson County, Iowa, United States. The population was 506 at the 2020 census.

Sabula is the site of Iowa's only island city. The island has a beach and a campground, as well as a harbor with boat docks.

Sabula is the northern terminus of U.S. Route 67.

== History ==
Sabula was established in 1835 when, according to legend, Isaac Dorman crossed the river from the Illinois side on a log and decided to settle on the present site of Sabula. Sabula is a name of French origin meaning "sand"; this refers to the sandy soil of the area.

In the late 19th century the principal industries in the community included a large "pearl button" factory—which produced buttons from clam shells harvested from large clam beds located in the river adjacent to the shoreline. (The factory is no longer there.) The thriving community also supported a large hog slaughtering industry.

The community did not actually become an island until the lock and dam system was constructed by the Army Corps of Engineers on the upper Mississippi in the 1930s. The construction of Lock and Dam No. 13 between Clinton, Iowa and Fulton, Illinois in 1939 left the lowlands west of the townsite permanently flooded, creating the "Island City," as the town is now known.

== Geography ==
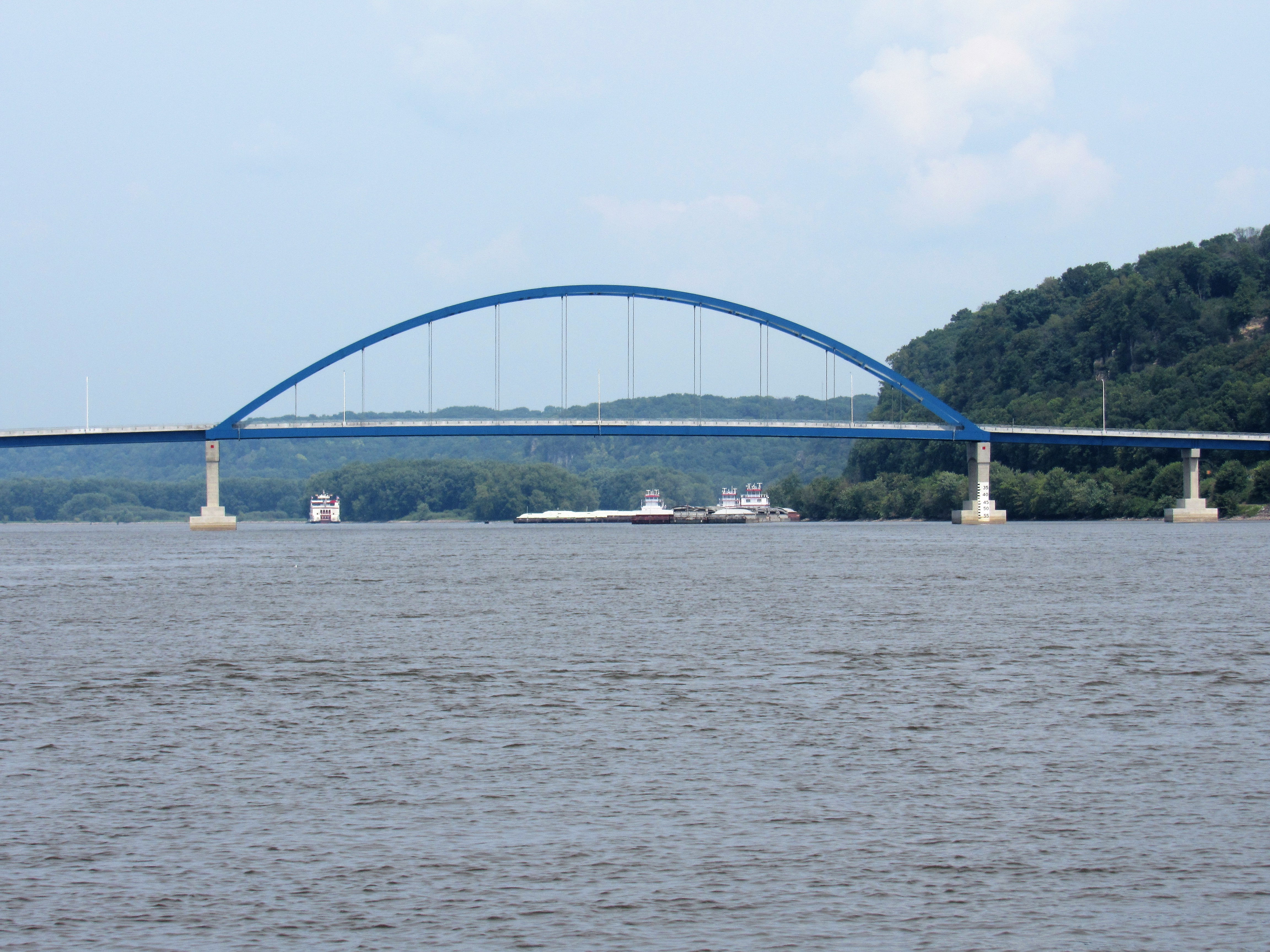
Dale Gardner Veterans Memorial Bridge between Sabula and Savanna, Illinois

According to the United States Census Bureau, the city has a total area of 1.26 square miles (3.26 km^{2}), of which 0.40 square miles (1.04 km^{2}) is land and 0.86 square miles (2.23 km^{2}) is water.

Sabula is connected to Iowa via a roadway that runs between two lakes and with Savanna, Illinois, by another roadway that leads to a bridge that crosses the Mississippi River.

== Demographics ==
Historical populations
Year	Pop.	±%
1850	168	—
1860	406	+141.7%
1870	920	+126.6%
1880	1,223	+32.9%
1890	918	−24.9%
1900	1,029	+12.1%
1910	918	−10.8%
1920	865	−5.8%
1930	759	−12.3%
1940	771	+1.6%
1950	888	+15.2%
1960	894	+0.7%
1970	845	−5.5%
1980	824	−2.5%
1990	710	−13.8%
2000	670	−5.6%
2010	576	−14.0%
2020	506	−12.2%
Source:"U.S. Census website". United States Census Bureau. and Iowa Data Center; Source: U.S. Decennial Census

=== 2020 census ===
As of the census of 2020, there were 506 people, 261 households, and 148 families residing in the city. The population density was 1,023.6 inhabitants per square mile (395.2/km^{2}). There were 316 housing units at an average density of 639.2 per square mile (246.8/km^{2}). The racial makeup of the city was 97.0% White, 0.0% Black or African American, 1.2% Native American, 0.0% Asian, 0.0% Pacific Islander, 0.2% from other races and 1.6% from two or more races. Hispanic or Latino persons of any race comprised 1.4% of the population.

Of the 261 households, 18.4% of which had children under the age of 18 living with them, 43.7% were married couples living together, 5.0% were cohabitating couples, 30.3% had a female householder with no spouse or partner present and 21.1% had a male householder with no spouse or partner present. 43.3% of all households were non-families. 39.5% of all households were made up of individuals, 18.4% had someone living alone who was 65 years old or older.

The median age in the city was 54.3 years. 17.6% of the residents were under the age of 20; 4.9% were between the ages of 20 and 24; 16.6% were from 25 and 44; 32.4% were from 45 and 64; and 28.5% were 65 years of age or older. The gender makeup of the city was 49.2% male and 50.8% female.

=== 2010 census ===
As of the census of 2010, there were 576 people, 270 households, and 157 families living in the city. The population density was 1,440.0 inhabitants per square mile (556.0/km^{2}). There were 321 housing units at an average density of 802.5 per square mile (309.8/km^{2}). The racial makeup of the city was 99.1% White, 0.2% African American, 0.2% Native American, 0.2% from other races, and 0.3% from two or more races. Hispanic or Latino of any race were 0.7% of the population.

There were 270 households, of which 24.8% had children under the age of 18 living with them, 43.3% were married couples living together, 12.2% had a female householder with no husband present, 2.6% had a male householder with no wife present, and 41.9% were non-families. 37.0% of all households were made up of individuals, and 19.3% had someone living alone who was 65 years of age or older. The average household size was 2.13 and the average family size was 2.81.

The median age in the city was 45 years. 22.4% of residents were under the age of 18; 6% were between the ages of 18 and 24; 21.6% were from 25 to 44; 29.6% were from 45 to 64; and 20.3% were 65 years of age or older. The gender makeup of the city was 46.9% male and 53.1% female.

=== 2000 census ===
As of the census of 2000, there were 670 people, 308 households, and 182 families living in the city. The population density was 1,709.3 inhabitants per square mile (660.0/km^{2}). There were 337 housing units at an average density of 859.8 per square mile (332.0/km^{2}). The racial makeup of the city was 100.00% White. Hispanic or Latino of any race were 1.04% of the population.

There were 308 households, out of which 23.4% had children under the age of 18 living with them, 43.2% were married couples living together, 12.0% had a female householder with no husband present, and 40.6% were non-families. 36.0% of all households were made up of individuals, and 19.2% had someone living alone who was 65 years of age or older. The average household size was 2.18 and the average family size was 2.78.

In the city, the population was spread out, with 22.1% under the age of 18, 6.0% from 18 to 24, 23.7% from 25 to 44, 25.8% from 45 to 64, and 22.4% who were 65 years of age or older. The median age was 43 years. For every 100 females, there were 92.5 males. For every 100 females age 18 and over, there were 89.8 males.

The median income for a household in the city was $30,192, and the median income for a family was $39,688. Males had a median income of $29,000 versus $20,500 for females. The per capita income for the city was $16,901. About 11.5% of families and 14.4% of the population were below the poverty line, including 24.3% of those under age 18 and 4.7% of those age 65 or over.

== Government ==
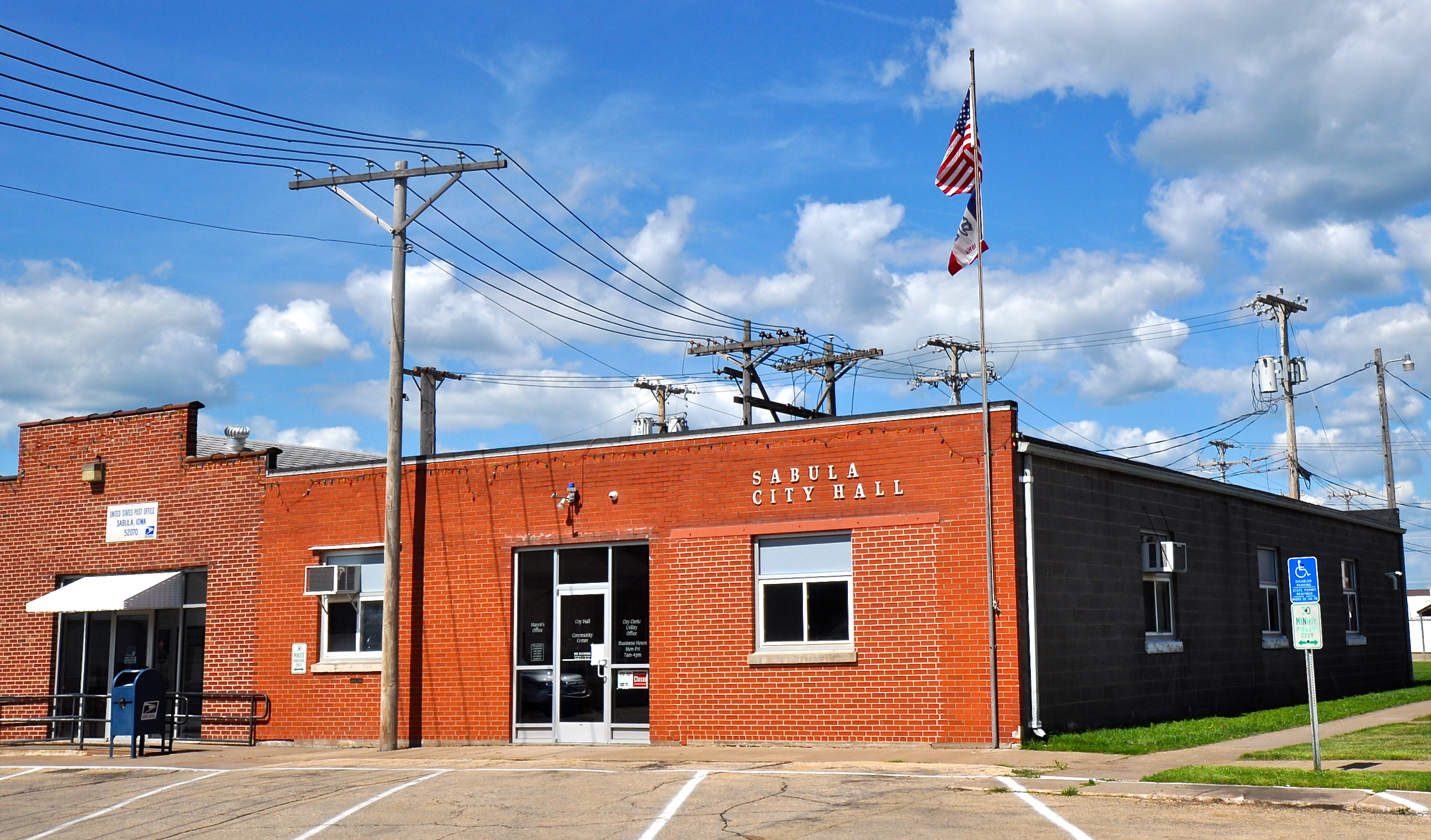
Sabula City Hall

Sabula has a post office and a community center. Fire protection is provided by the Sabula Volunteer Fire Department.The Sabula Fire Department protects everything within city limits as well as accident response in the ambulance district and is also available to respond mutual aid to other cities in Iowa and Illinois. Most of the city firefighters are certified as Iowa Firefighter Ones and Hazmat Operations. Quartered with the Fire Department is an Ambulance service also made up of volunteers which provides ambulances to the city and outlying areas. The Ambulance service operates two Basic Life Support Ambulances. Prior to the Sabula Ambulance (Originally called the "Emergency Unit") the local funeral home provided a for profit ambulance. In 1974 the Fire Chief created the Emergency Unit and brought the first trained EMTs to the city drawn from firemen. Sabula has a public works department that plows the roads in winter and provides other services. Police protection is provided by the Sabula Police and Jackson County Sheriffs Office.

Sabula has a Mayor-Council city government. Meetings and elections are held in city hall.

== Education ==
Sabula is a part of the Easton Valley Community School District, formed in 2013 by the merger of the East Central Community School District and the Preston Community School District. East Central formed in 1974 by the merger of the Sabula Community School District and the Miles Community School District. At one point the former East Central district entered into a grade-sharing relationship with the Northeast Community School District, in that East Central residents attended Northeast secondary schools.

Sabula previously had a school in the community, and it first met in a settler's home in 1838. New campuses were built in 1856 and then in 1883. By circa 2012 the leadership of what would be the Easton Valley district was seeking to close the Sabula school due to potential future upkeep costs and because of how old it was. The Sabula school remained vacant until 2015, when the Easton Valley board voted unanimously in favor of demolishing it. The school district and the city government both agreed to demolition after considering other options and uses.

== Religion ==
Sabula is served by three churches: Sabula United Methodist church (dating to 1839), St. Peter's Catholic Church (dating to the 1840s), Calvary Lutheran Church (built in 1944).
