= Antioch School (Anamosa, Iowa) =

- U.S. National Register of Historic Places
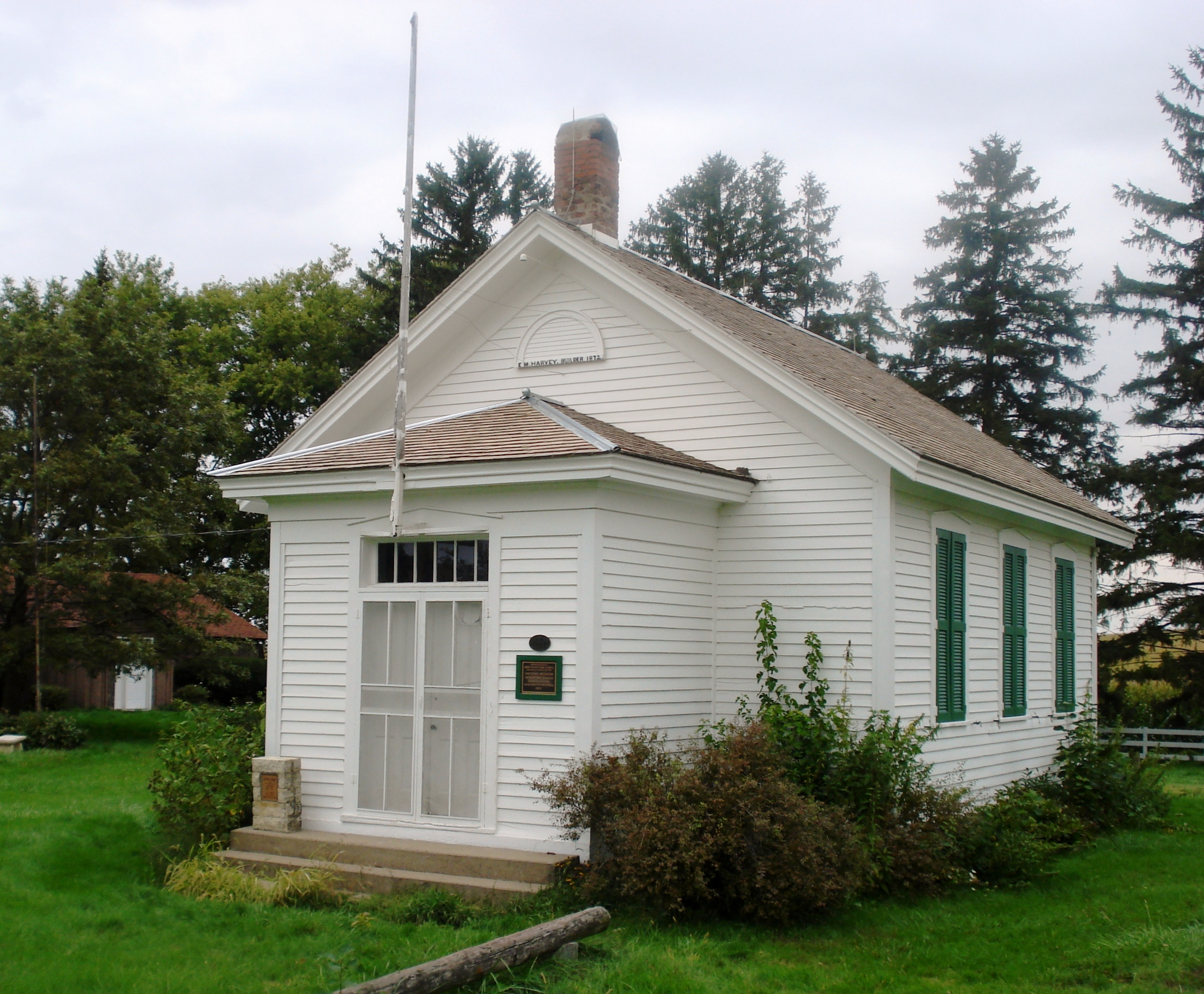

- Location within Iowa Location within the United States
- Location: Iowa Highway 64, 4 miles (6.4 km) east of Anamosa
- Coordinates: 42°05′07.3″N 91°12′50.6″W
- Area: 1-acre (0.40 ha)
- Built: 1872
- Built by: Edward M. Harvey
- NRHP reference No.: 00001654
- Added to NRHP: January 16, 2001

Antioch School is a historic building located east of Anamosa, Iowa, United States. The frame one-room schoolhouse was constructed by local builder Edward M. Harvey in 1872. It served as a school until 1959, when it was closed. American Regionalist artist Grant Wood attended school here from 1896 to 1901. The buildings and grounds were bought by the Paint N' Palette Club who used the old school building as an art studio and gallery until 1965 when they built their present facility on the property. In 1997, the Jones County Historic Preservation Commission acquired the school building and grounds. There is also an outhouse northwest of the school building. The school and outhouse were listed together on the National Register of Historic Places in 2001.
