= Northeast Community School District =

Public school district in Goose Lake, Iowa, United States

Location
- Goose Lake, Iowa Clinton County United States
- Coordinates: 41.965879°N 90.374705°W

District information
- Type: Local school district
- Grades: K-12
- Established: 1962
- Superintendent: Alicia Christiansen
- Schools: 2
- Budget: $12,428,000 (2020-21)
- NCES District ID: 1921090

Students and staff
- Students: 868 (2022-23)
- Teachers: 64.26 FTE
- Staff: 69.65 FTE
- Student–teacher ratio: 13.51
- Athletic conference: River Valley Conference
- District mascot: Rebels
- Colors: Columbia Blue and White

Other information
- Website: www.northeast.k12.ia.us

Northeast Community School District is a rural public school district headquartered in Goose Lake, Iowa.

Located entirely in Clinton County, it serves Goose Lake, Andover, and Charlotte.

== History ==
Northeast Community School District was formed in 1962, with the consolidation of Goose Lake, Elvira and Charlotte schools.

At one time the East Central Community School District had a whole grade-sharing agreement in which East Central sent students in grades 7–12 to the Northeast district. East Central residents had the option of instead attending Preston Community School District's secondary school in an open enrollment scheme, although most secondary students attended Northeast.

On July 1, 2013, East Central merged with the Preston district to form the Easton Valley Community School District. Northeast later sued the new Easton Valley district after that district stated that the grade-sharing agreement was no longer in place as Easton Valley was not the same district as the former East Central, and therefore had refused to pay Northeast related costs. The Northeast district began asking for compensation after the Iowa Supreme Court decided that the grade-sharing agreement was still in place; Northeast argued that the contract had been breached. In 2015 a settlement was reached involving Easton Valley paying Northeast $450,000.

== Schools ==
The district operates two schools, both in rural Goose Lake:

- Northeast Elementary School
- Northeast Middle-High School

=== Northeast High School ===
==== Athletics ====
The Northeast Rebels compete in the River Valley Conference in the following sports:

- Baseball
- Bowling
- Basketball
- Cross Country
- Football
- Golf
- Soccer
- Softball
- Tennis (with Clinton)
- Track and Field
  - Girls' 2003 Class 1A State Champions
- Volleyball
- Wrestling

== See also ==
- List of school districts in Iowa
- List of high schools in Iowa
