= Monmouth, Iowa =

- City
- Location of Monmouth, Iowa
- Coordinates: 42°04′30″N 90°52′40″W
- Country: United States
- State: Iowa
- County: Jackson
- Incorporated: July 12, 1894

Area
  - Total: 0.57 sq mi (1.47 km^{2})
  - Land: 0.57 sq mi (1.47 km^{2})
  - Water: 0 sq mi (0.00 km^{2})
- Elevation: 745 ft (227 m)

Population (2020)
  - Total: 129
  - Density: 226.8/sq mi (87.57/km^{2})
- Time zone: UTC-6 (Central (CST))
  - Summer (DST): UTC-5 (CDT)
- ZIP code: 52309
- Area code: 563
- FIPS code: 19-53265
- GNIS feature ID: 2395372

Monmouth is a city in Jackson County, Iowa, United States. The population was 129 at the time of the 2020 census.

== History ==
Monmouth was laid out in 1856. It took its name from Monmouth Township.

== Geography ==
According to the United States Census Bureau, the city has a total area of 0.56 square miles (1.45 km^{2}), all land.

== Demographics ==
Historical populations
Year	Pop.	±%
1900	281	—
1910	221	−21.4%
1920	200	−9.5%
1930	198	−1.0%
1940	190	−4.0%
1950	198	+4.2%
1960	291	+47.0%
1970	257	−11.7%
1980	210	−18.3%
1990	169	−19.5%
2000	180	+6.5%
2010	153	−15.0%
2020	129	−15.7%
Source:"U.S. Census website". United States Census Bureau. and Iowa Data Center; Source: U.S. Decennial Census

=== 2020 census ===
As of the census of 2020, there were 129 people, 61 households, and 41 families residing in the city. The population density was 226.8 inhabitants per square mile (87.6/km^{2}). There were 63 housing units at an average density of 110.8 per square mile (42.8/km^{2}). The racial makeup of the city was 95.3% White, 0.0% Black or African American, 0.0% Native American, 0.0% Asian, 0.0% Pacific Islander, 0.8% from other races and 3.9% from two or more races. Hispanic or Latino persons of any race comprised 1.6% of the population.

Of the 61 households, 26.2% of which had children under the age of 18 living with them, 50.8% were married couples living together, 9.8% were cohabitating couples, 18.0% had a female householder with no spouse or partner present and 21.3% had a male householder with no spouse or partner present. 32.8% of all households were non-families. 26.2% of all households were made up of individuals, 11.5% had someone living alone who was 65 years old or older.

The median age in the city was 53.1 years. 19.4% of the residents were under the age of 20; 3.1% were between the ages of 20 and 24; 20.2% were from 25 and 44; 35.7% were from 45 and 64; and 21.7% were 65 years of age or older. The gender makeup of the city was 46.5% male and 53.5% female.

=== 2010 census ===
As of the census of 2010, there were 153 people, 63 households, and 41 families living in the city. The population density was 273.2 inhabitants per square mile (105.5/km^{2}). There were 69 housing units at an average density of 123.2 per square mile (47.6/km^{2}). The racial makeup of the city was 98.0% White, 0.7% African American, 0.7% Asian, and 0.7% from two or more races. Hispanic or Latino of any race were 2.0% of the population.

There were 63 households, of which 22.2% had children under the age of 18 living with them, 55.6% were married couples living together, 6.3% had a female householder with no husband present, 3.2% had a male householder with no wife present, and 34.9% were non-families. 27.0% of all households were made up of individuals, and 8% had someone living alone who was 65 years of age or older. The average household size was 2.43 and the average family size was 2.95.

The median age in the city was 45.2 years. 17% of residents were under the age of 18; 9.1% were between the ages of 18 and 24; 23.5% were from 25 to 44; 34.6% were from 45 to 64; and 15.7% were 65 years of age or older. The gender makeup of the city was 45.1% male and 54.9% female.

=== 2000 census ===
As of the census of 2000, there were 180 people, 72 households, and 46 families living in the city. The population density was 320.5 inhabitants per square mile (123.7/km^{2}). There were 77 housing units at an average density of 137.1 per square mile (52.9/km^{2}). The racial makeup of the city was 98.33% White, and 1.67% from two or more races.

There were 72 households, out of which 36.1% had children under the age of 18 living with them, 45.8% were married couples living together, 12.5% had a female householder with no husband present, and 36.1% were non-families. 27.8% of all households were made up of individuals, and 11.1% had someone living alone who was 65 years of age or older. The average household size was 2.50 and the average family size was 3.07.

In the city, the population was spread out, with 27.8% under the age of 18, 6.7% from 18 to 24, 34.4% from 25 to 44, 16.7% from 45 to 64, and 14.4% who were 65 years of age or older. The median age was 36 years. For every 100 females, there were 95.7 males. For every 100 females age 18 and over, there were 97.0 males.

The median income for a household in the city was $25,714, and the median income for a family was $26,875. Males had a median income of $21,429 versus $14,875 for females. The per capita income for the city was $10,671. None of the families and 7.5% of the population were living below the poverty line, including no under eighteens and 12.5% of those over 64.

== Education ==
Monmouth is within the Midland Community School District.
