= East Central Community School District =

Former school district in Iowa

East Central Community School District was a school district in Iowa with campuses in Miles and Sabula.

== History ==
It was established on July 1, 1974, with the merger of the Miles Community School District and the Sabula Community School District. At one time, both Miles and Sabula had elementary schools, while Sabula had the middle school and Miles had the high school.

At one time East Central had a whole grade-sharing agreement, in which East Central sent students in grades 7–12 to the Northeast Community School District. East Central residents had the option of instead attending Preston Community School District's secondary school in an open enrollment scheme, although most secondary students attended Northeast.

=== Merger and aftermath ===
By 2012 there were discussions on merging with Preston, and Robert Lagerblade, the superintendent of the Preston district, presented a report stating that there would be a better financial system.

The district's area education agency, Mississippi Bend Area Education Agency, received a petition of over 1,200 people who wished to schedule an election that would determine whether East Central and Preston would merge. Mississippi Bend accepted the petition, and in June 2010 scheduled a vote for the fall of 2010. East Central sued Mississippi Bend for determining the election time. Mary E. Howes, the judge of the Jackson County District Court, stated that Mississippi Bend AEA had the right to determine the time of the election. East Central decided to submit an appeal to the Iowa Supreme Court, with three school board members voting in favor and two voting against.

Voters in both districts approved the merger, by 776–122 in the Preston district and 620–598 in the East Central district. The anti-merging group Opt4EC had asked for a recount of East Central ballots, but the recount found no difference in the numbers. On July 1, 2013, East Central merged with the Preston district to form the Easton Valley Community School District. Therefore, the Easton Valley secondary school in Preston became the default high school, and Easton Valley residents who wished to remain at Northeast would have to participate in a new open enrollment program. The Northeast and Easton Valley districts later entered into a lawsuit as the new Easton Valley district stated that the grade-sharing agreement was no longer in place as it was not the same district; in 2015 a settlement was reached involving Easton Valley paying Northeast $450,000.

The leadership of what would become Easton Valley was seeking to close the Sabula school due to potential future upkeep costs and because of how old it was; it was to retain the Miles school. The Sabula school remained vacant until 2015, when the Easton Valley board voted unanimously in favor of demolishing it.
