= Preston Community School District =

Defunct school district in Iowa, US

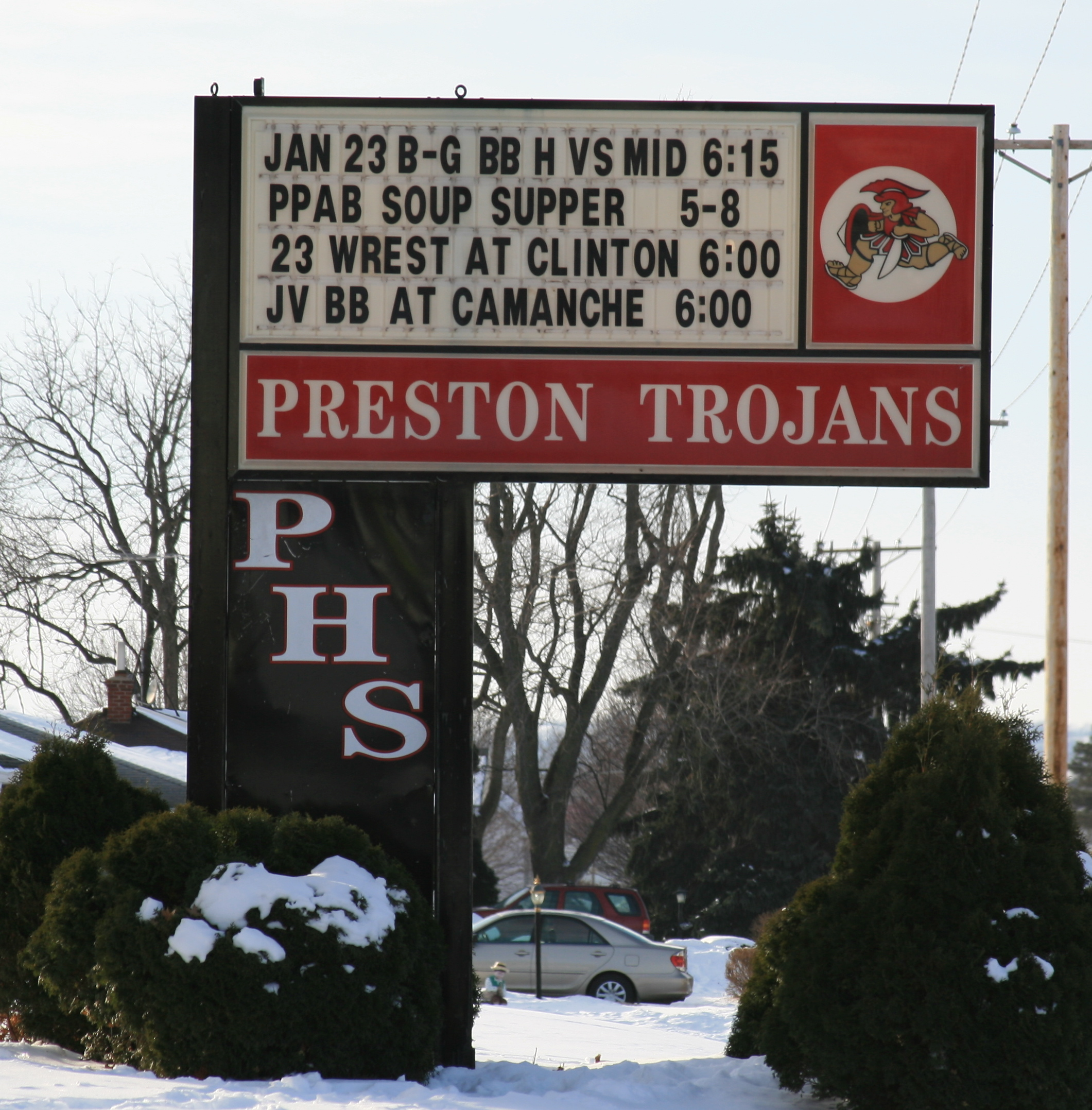
Sign outside Preston High School

Preston Community School District was a school district consisting of a school in Preston, Iowa, United States.

As of 2005-2006 the district had 335 students and 31 teachers.

By 2012 there were discussions on merging with the East Central Community School District, and Robert Lagerblade, the superintendent of the Preston district, presented a report stating that there would be a better financial system. Voters in both districts approved the merger, by 776–122 in the Preston district and 620–598 in the East Central district. On July 1, 2013, East Central merged with the Preston district to form the Easton Valley Community School District. The Easton Valley leadership was to retain the usage of both school facilities in Preston.
