= Central Theatre =

Central Theatre may refer to:

- Central Theatre (Chicago), or Steinway Hall, Illinois, U.S. (1896–1970)
- Central Theatre (New York City), New York, U.S. (1918–1998)
- Central Theatre (Passaic, New Jersey), U.S. (1941—late 1970s)
- Central Theatre (San Francisco) (1900-1913)
- Central Theater, Ely, Nevada, a historic building opened in 1941
- Central Theatre (film), a 2014 Indian Malayalam-language film
