= Bradford Perkins =

Bradford Perkins may refer to:

- Bradford Perkins (historian) (1925–2008), American historian
- Bradford Perkins (architect) (born 1943), founding partner of Perkins Eastman
