= Perkins Eastman =

American architectural firm

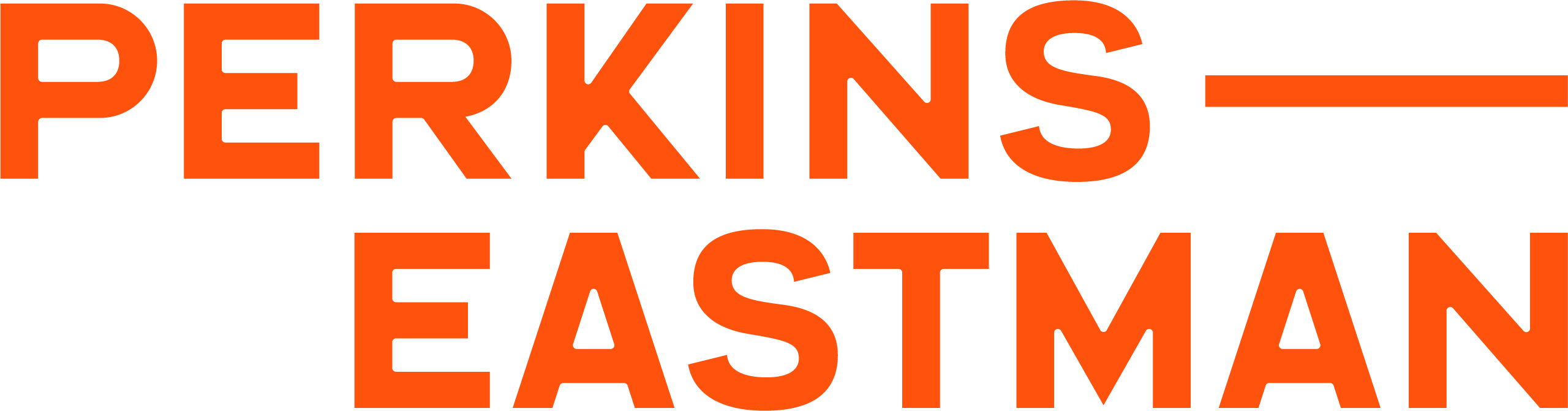
- Industry: Architecture
- Founded: 1981; 45 years ago in New York City
- Founders: Bradford Perkins and Mary-Jean Eastman
- Headquarters: New York City
- Number of locations: 23 studios worldwide
- Key people: Co-CEOs: Andrew Adelhardt III; Shawn Basler; Nick Leahy
- Number of employees: 1,100
- Website: www.perkinseastman.com

Perkins Eastman is an international architecture, urban design, planning, strategic consulting, and interior design firm. Headquartered in New York City, the firm is led by founding Principals Bradford Perkins and Mary-Jean Eastman.

== History ==
The history of Perkins Eastman goes back more than a century, when Co-Founder and Chairman Brad Perkins' grandfather, Dwight Heald Perkins, started an architecture firm in the late 19th century. Dwight later received commissions for the design of two universities in China. Brad's father, Lawrence Bradford Perkins, would go on to form to the global firm Perkins&Will. Bradford Perkins met his future Perkins Eastman co-founder, Mary-Jean Eastman, in the late 1970s when they were both working on New York City's bid to host the 1984 Summer Olympics—Perkins was with the joint venture of Davis Brody and Llewelyn-Davies International while Eastman was working in tandem for the State of New York. When Los Angeles won the bid, Eastman went to work for Davis Brody briefly, while Perkins joined Perkins&Will in 1977 as the managing principal of its East Coast offices. Eastman followed Perkins there in 1978 as the studio leader of its New York office.

In 1981, Perkins and Eastman left Perkins&Will and partnered with Eli Attia to form Attia & Perkins. Attia left during that decade, and the firm was renamed to Perkins Geddis Eastman when Barbara Geddis joined the leadership. Geddis stepped down in 1991, and the firm became Perkins Eastman.

== Leadership ==
In addition to the co-founders, Chairman Bradford Perkins and Vice Chair Mary-Jean Eastman, the company named Shawn Basler, Nick Leahy, and General Counsel Andrew Adelhardt III as co-CEOs on Jan. 25, 2019. The five leaders comprise an executive committee that also includes principals Hilary Bertsch, Jeffrey Brand, Stephanie Kingsnorth, Supriya Thyagarajan, Jeff Young, Chief Financial Officer Paul Grillo, and Human Resources Director Salema Gumbs.

== Growth and expansion ==
As of 2024, Perkins Eastman has over 1,100 employees and 23 studios. According to the Architectural Record, It is the 14th largest architectural firm in the United States, Internationally, the firm operates studios in Dubai; Guayaquil, Ecuador; Mumbai; Shanghai; Singapore; Toronto; and Vancouver.
