= Dwight Perkins House =

Historic house in Illinois, United States

- U.S. National Register of Historic Places
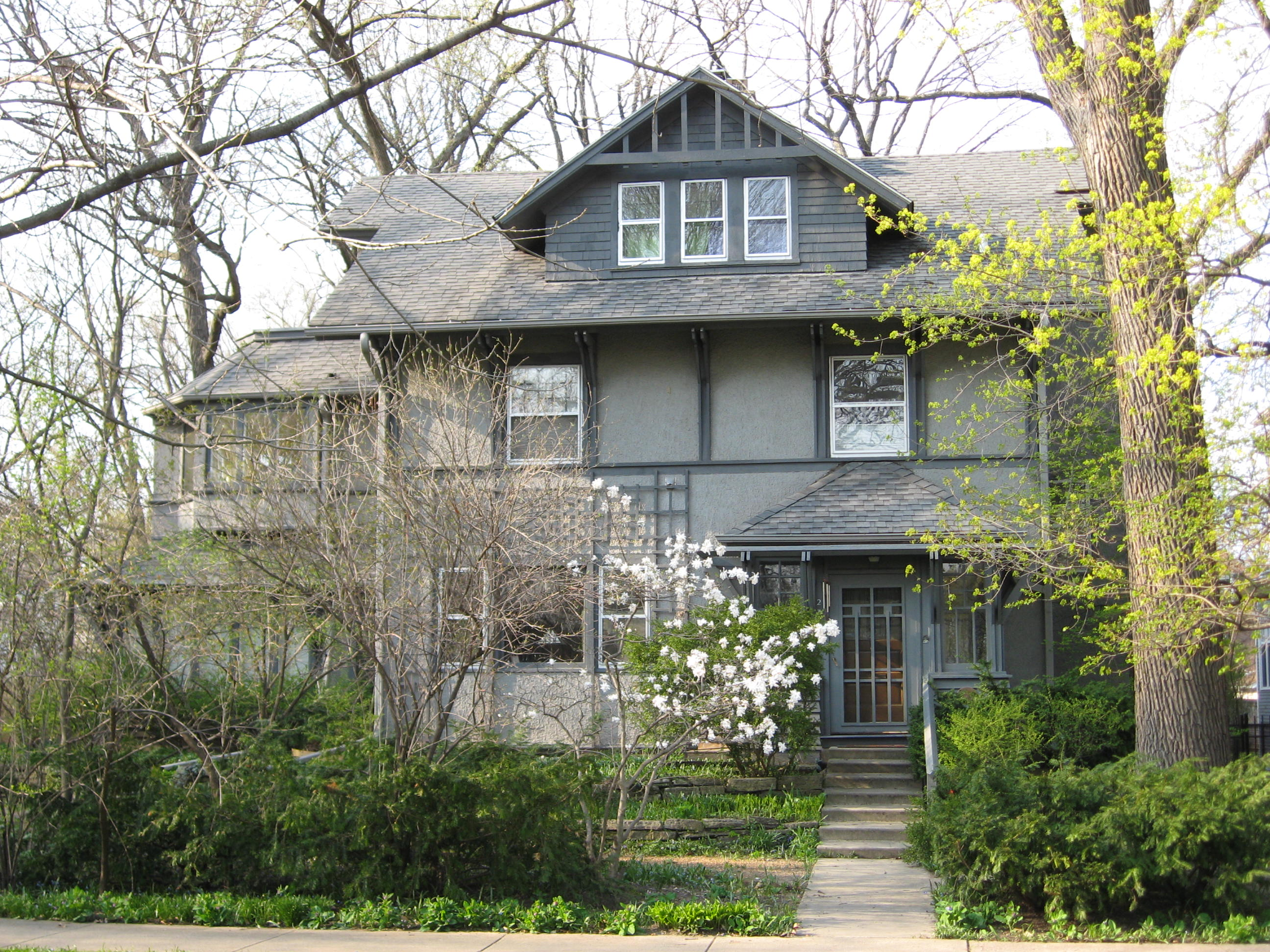

- Location within Illinois Location within the United States
- Location: 2319 Lincoln St., Evanston, Illinois
- Coordinates: 42°3′44″N 87°42′47″W
- Area: less than one acre
- Built: 1904
- Architect: Perkins, Dwight H.
- Architectural style: Prairie School
- NRHP reference No.: 85001908
- Added to NRHP: August 29, 1985

The Dwight Perkins House is a historic house located at 2319 Lincoln Street in Evanston, Illinois. The house was built in 1904 for architect Dwight H. Perkins and children's author and illustrator Lucy Fitch Perkins. Perkins designed his house in a style heavily influenced by the Prairie School and the Arts and Crafts Movement. The house was built from wood and stucco, materials characteristic of both styles which let the house blend into the surrounding nature. Its exterior decorative features include bracketed eaves, casement windows, trellises, and a half-timbered gable. Landscape architect Jens Jensen, a friend of the Perkinses, designed the house's surroundings, which include a reflecting pool. The inside of the house incorporates horizontal bands of windows which let in sunlight, unpainted wood features, and an open floor plan.

The house was added to the National Register of Historic Places on August 29, 1985.
