= Farmers Security Bank =

- U.S. National Register of Historic Places
- U.S. Historic district – Contributing property
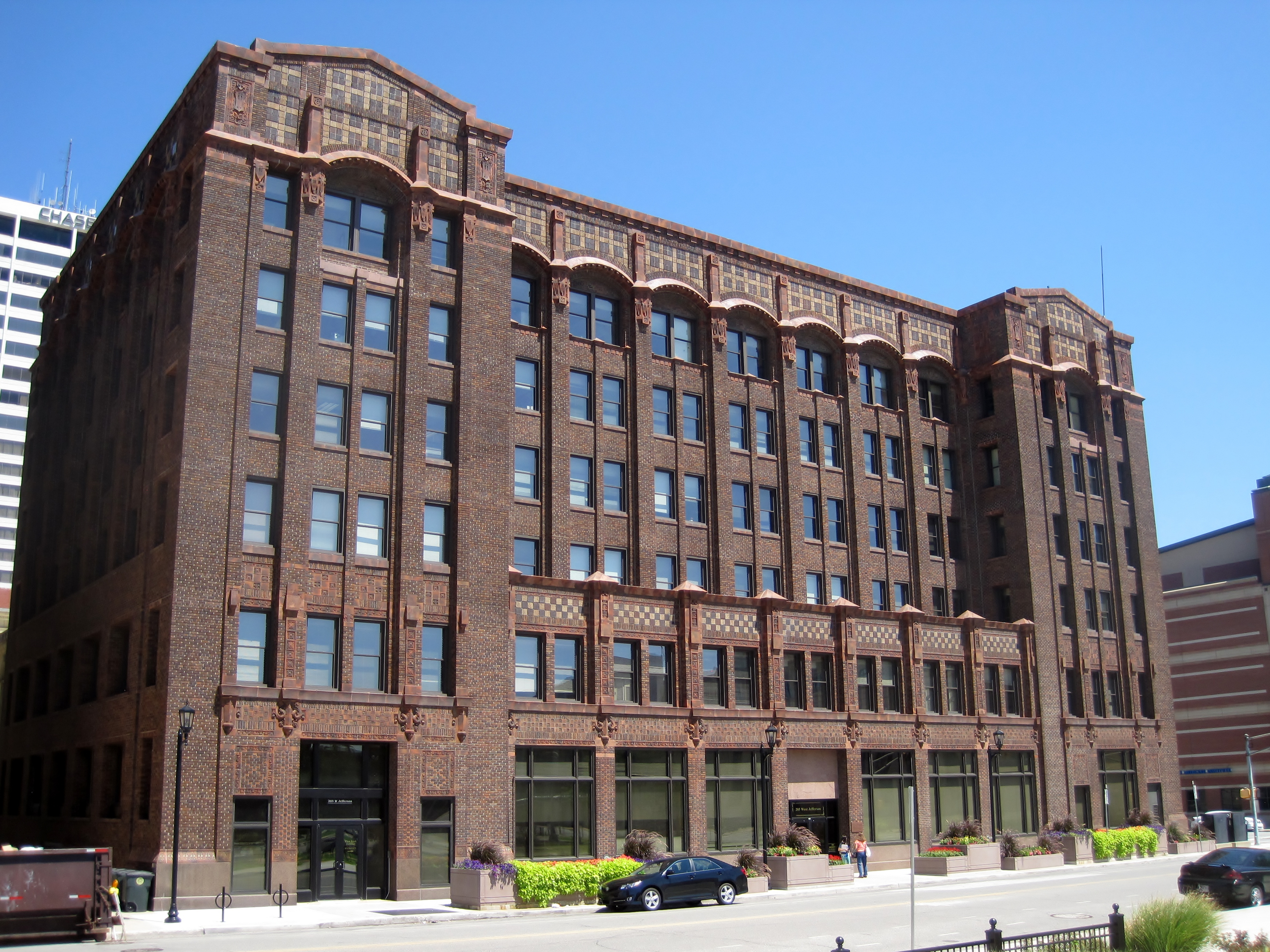

- Location within Indiana Location within the United States
- Location: 133 S. Main St., South Bend, Indiana
- Coordinates: 41°40′31″N 86°15′7″W
- Area: less than one acre
- Built: 1915
- Architect: Perkins, Fellows & Hamilton
- Architectural style: Chicago
- MPS: Downtown South Bend Historic MRA
- NRHP reference No.: 85001210
- Added to NRHP: June 5, 1985

Farmers Security Bank, also known as the First Bank Building, is a historic bank building located at South Bend, Indiana. It was built in 1915, and is a six-story, Commercial style dark brown brick building with terra cotta trim. It has a two-story rectangular plan, which forms an "H" on the four upper stories.

It was listed on the National Register of Historic Places in 1985. It is located in the West Washington Historic District.
