= Capital Theater (Ely, Nevada) =

- U.S. National Register of Historic Places
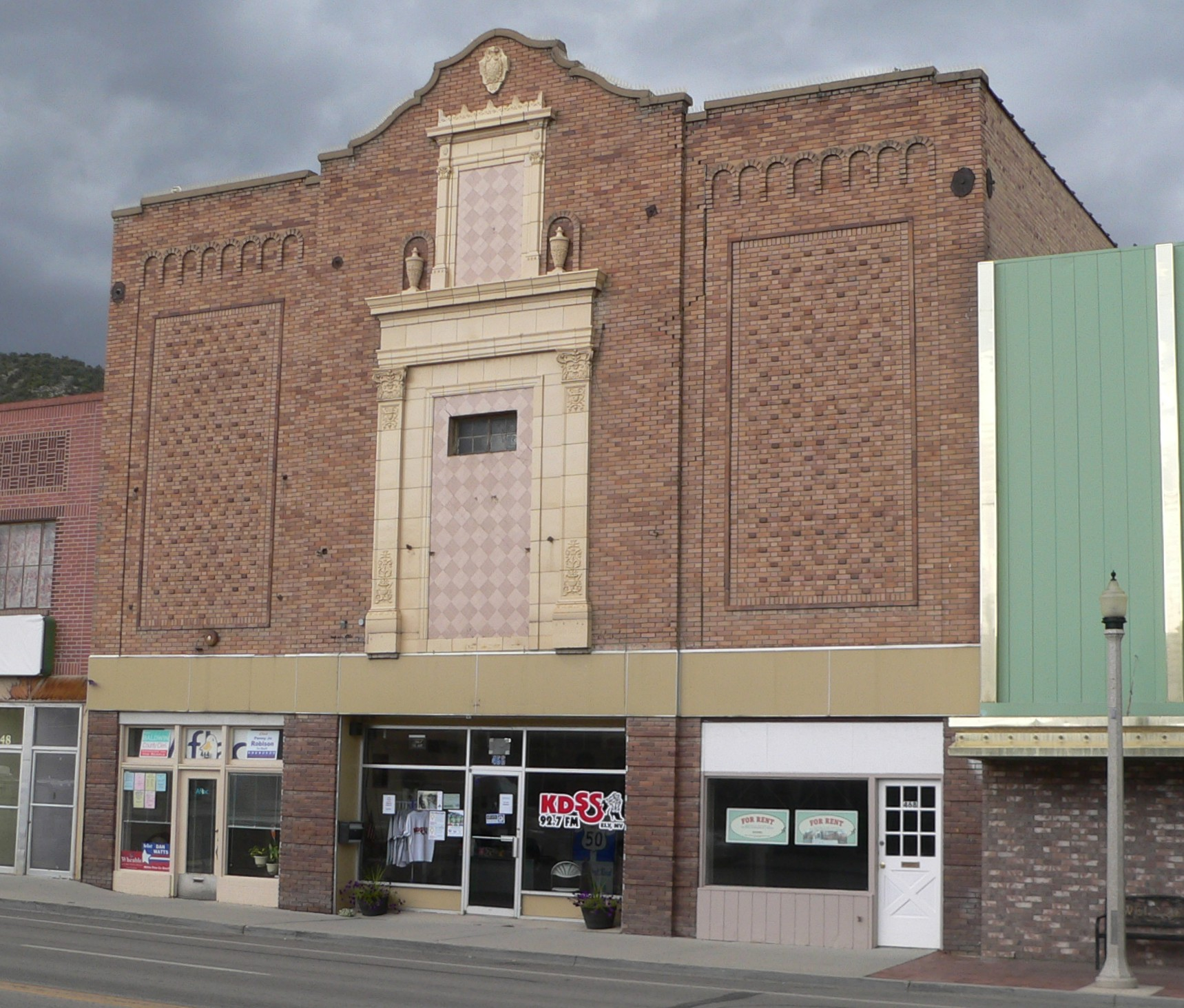
- Capital Theater in 2014

- Location within Nevada Location within the United States
- Location: 464–468 Aultman St., Ely, Nevada
- Coordinates: 39°14′53.3″N 114°53′36.3″W
- Built: 1916
- Architect: Fleming, C.O.; Hull, Percy W.
- Architectural style: Mission/Spanish Revival
- NRHP reference No.: 93000692
- Added to NRHP: August 05, 1993

The Capital Theater in Ely, Nevada was built in 1916 by C.O. Fleming and W.P. Hull. The building began as a vaudeville hall that hosted a diverse range of live entertainment, including acrobats, comedians, lecturers, and magicians. The building reopened as a cinema in 1923, at a time when films were becoming popular. The theater closed in 1963. The building's style represents a possible reconstruction after a 1929 fire, and might best be described as Spanish Colonial Revival. The theater's design was carried out by the owners.

The tall brick exterior's lower portion, which houses the retail stores, has been altered, but the upper two thirds remain as built with a scalloped parapet. The interior was remodeled in the Art Deco style in 1938, shortly after the Hull brothers' other theater, the Central Theater, was completed in the same style.

The Capital was listed on the National Register of Historic Places in 1993. Brothers Brad and Chris Lani, local residents originally from Hawaii, purchased the theater from owner Norm Goeringer in December 2004. In January 2007, the Lanis announced plans to renovate the building and reopen it as a multi-purpose theater for films, concerts, and theatrical performances. The building was found to be in excellent condition following an inspection. At the time, the building was occupied by Herline Jewelry and Fantasy Fast Photo.
