= Victor F. Lawson House YMCA =

- U.S. National Register of Historic Places
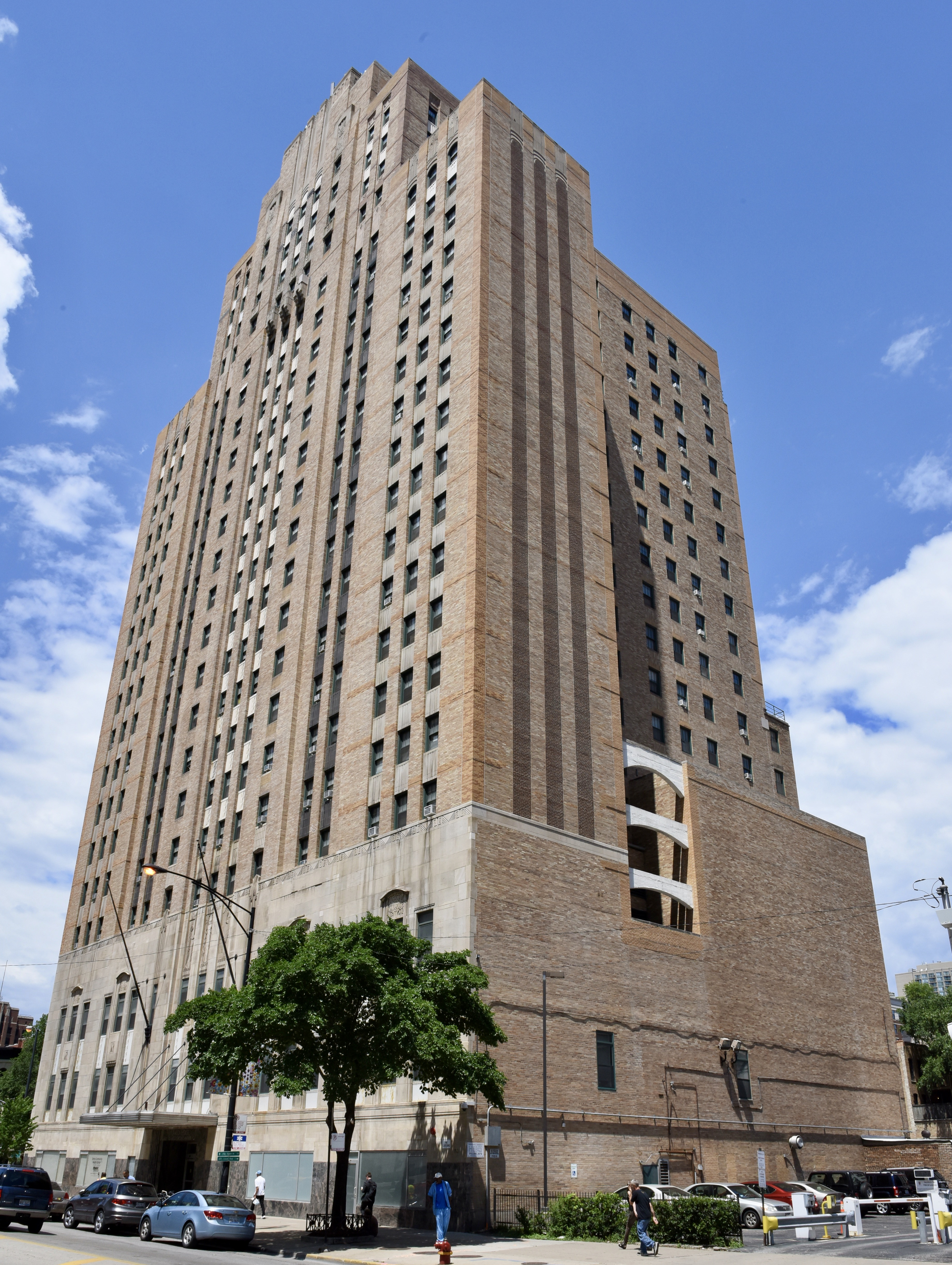

- Location within Chicago metropolitan area Location within Illinois Location within the United States
- Location: 30 W. Chicago Avenue, Chicago, Illinois
- Coordinates: 41°53′48″N 87°37′46″W
- Built: 1931
- Architect: Perkins, Chatten & Hammond
- Architectural style: Art Deco
- NRHP reference No.: 100000959
- Added to NRHP: May 8, 2017

The Victor F. Lawson House is a historic former YMCA building located at 30 W. Chicago Avenue in the Near North Side neighborhood of Chicago, Illinois. The building was built in 1931 for the YMCA of Metropolitan Chicago, which was established in 1858 and had grown considerably during the 1920s. It was named for newspaperman Victor Lawson, one of the YMCA's largest donors until his death in 1925. The architecture firm of Perkins, Chatten & Hammond designed the 24-story building in the Art Deco style. The YMCA used the new building to provide affordable housing and community services during the Great Depression, including family programs that were copied in other cities, and the building became the headquarters of the YMCA of Metropolitan Chicago after World War II.

The building was sold to Holsten Real Estate Development Corp. for $1 in 2014 on the condition that it will continue providing affordable housing on this property for at least 50 years. Lawson House was added to the National Register of Historic Places on May 8, 2017.

== See also ==
- Wabash Avenue YMCA
- YMCA Hotel (Chicago, Illinois)
