= Maples, Indiana =

- Unincorporated community
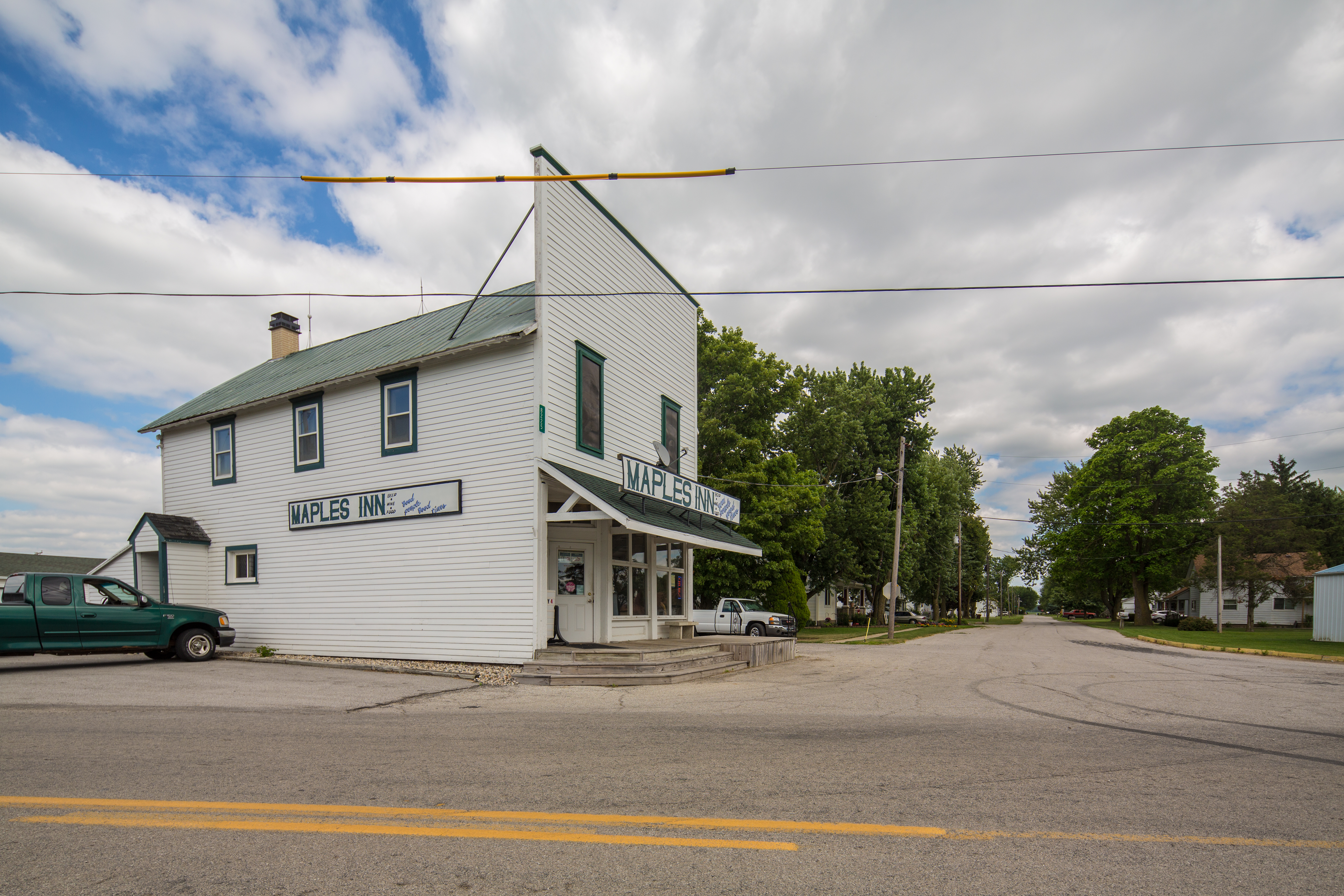

- Location within Indiana Location within the United States
- Coordinates: 41°00′39″N 84°58′05″W
- Country: United States
- State: Indiana
- County: Allen
- Township: Jefferson
- Elevation: 801 ft (244 m)

Population
  - Total: less than 200
- Time zone: UTC-5 (Eastern (EST))
  - Summer (DST): UTC-4 (EDT)
- ZIP code: 46816
- Area code: 260
- GNIS feature ID: 2830307

Maples is an unincorporated community in Jefferson Township, Allen County, in the U.S. state of Indiana.

== History ==
A post office was established at Maples in 1854, and remained in operation until it was discontinued in 1921. The community was named for Lewis S. Maples, a lumber baron.

== Demographics ==
The United States Census Bureau defined Maples as a census designated place in the 2022 American Community Survey.

== Notable people ==
- Lucy Fitch Perkins, author, was born in Maples.
