= Dwight H. Perkins (architect) =

American architect

Dwight Heald Perkins
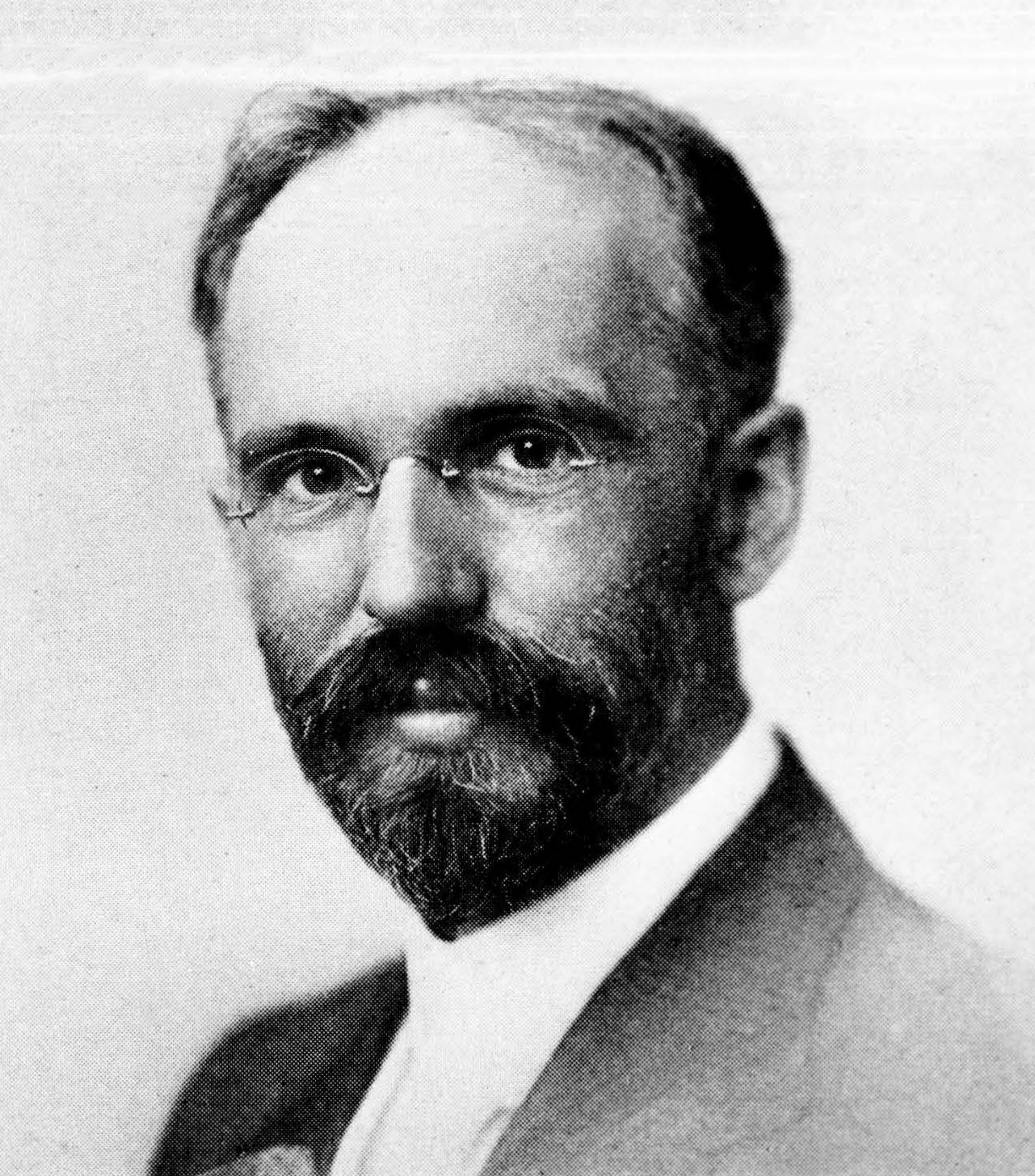
- Perkins in The Brickbuilder magazine (1915)
- Born: March 26, 1867; Memphis, Tennessee
- Died: November 2, 1941 (aged 74); Lordsburg, New Mexico
- Occupation: Architect
- Spouse: Lucy Fitch Perkins (m. 1891; died 1937)
- Education: Massachusetts Institute of Technology
- Relatives: Lawrence Perkins (son); Dwight H. Perkins II (grandson); Bradford Perkins (grandson); Marion Mahony Griffin (cousin)

12th Architect for the Chicago Board of Education
- In office June 1905 – April 1910
- Preceded by: Robert B. Williamson
- Succeeded by: Arthur F. Hussander

Dwight Heald Perkins (March 26, 1867 – November 2, 1941) was an American architect and planner.

== Early life ==
Perkins was born in Memphis, Tennessee, and moved to Chicago with his family at age four. His mother was widowed a few years after his family completed their move. His father died when Dwight was young.

Perkins attended only three months of high school, having to find work to help support his family. He worked initially at the Chicago Stockyards and later at the architectural firms Wheelock & Clay and for a few months for Frederick Schock. He was accepted to study architecture at the Massachusetts Institute of Technology in 1885. A family friend, Mrs. Charles Hitchcock, helped finance his education there.

He studied at MIT for two years and was so skilled that he was invited to serve as an instructor for a third year. Also while in Boston, he met Lucy Fitch, who would become his wife on August 18, 1891.

== Career ==
Perkins left Boston in late 1888. In January 1889 he interviewed at Burnham & Root in Chicago and was employed in early February of that year. He remained for 5 years, gradually assuming more and more responsibility. He left at the end of 1893 to form his own firm. It was during this period that Perkins was associated with a group called "The Eighteen" that included like-minded architects such as Lawrence Buck and Frank Lloyd Wright.

On January 1, 1894, he opened the office after receiving his first major commission, with help from Daniel Burnham, the Stevens Point, Wisconsin Normal School. In 1894 he was commissioned to design a new building for the Steinway Piano company. This building, Steinway Hall, bore little resemblance to the work he would do later, often in the style which became known as "Prairie School" of architecture.

Perkins was offered the commission for Charles Hitchcock Hall as a result of his connection with the donor for the building, Mrs. Charles Hitchcock, who had previously helped fund his college education.

Perkins was appointed the Chief Architect for the Chicago Board of Education by Mayor Edward F. Dunne in 1905. He was responsible for the design of 40 public schools. Among these structures was Carl Schurz High School which was described by the American Institute of Architects as "the best and most important" of his designs, in addition to being his "masterpiece" and an "important example of early twentieth century architecture, utilizing elements of both the Chicago and Prairie Schools of Architecture."

His five-year service in this role ended when he was accused of incompetence, inefficiency, and insubordination and was dismissed following a trial in which only the insubordination charge was upheld. However, it is generally accepted that the true reason for his firing was that he refused to bow down to the demands of the corrupt members of the Board of Education who insisted that he give contracts to their cronies.

Perkins had maintained a private practice with John L. Hamilton in addition to his service on the board. In 1911, with the addition of William K. Fellows, the firm of Perkins, Fellows, & Hamilton opened with offices in Chicago's loop. Perkins left the firm c. 1929 and joined what became Perkins, Chatten, and Hammond, which he left in 1933.

Perkins died in Lordsburg, New Mexico, in 1941 of a cerebral hemorrhage while traveling to his winter home in Pasadena, California.

Other works by Dwight Perkins firm include the Lincoln Park Zoo Lion House, the Alfred Nobel School, and many residential homes.

== Forest Preservation ==
Dwight Perkins was influential in establishing the Cook County Forest Preserve system. As Chicago and the metropolitan region grew quickly in the late 19th century, free spaces and opportunities for recreation and leisure were often forgotten in the rush to industrialize. Progressive Era reformers around the turn of the 20th century pushed for access to natural spaces, and city planners and architects often took part. Perkins was an icon of the Prairie School, which was a branch of the Arts and Crafts movement, a radical artistic movement to value handicraft, and to make art and beauty accessible to people of all social classes. Perkins's work is an example of this: excellent artistic architectural design in everyday city communities. The parks movement was another way to make sure natural beauty was accessible to Chicagoans. Dwight Perkins's son, Lawrence Perkins, who followed in his father's footsteps as another great Chicago architect, once said this of his father's oeuvre: "His real monument in his own eyes was the forest preserve system." Perkins co-wrote the 1905 Metropolitan Parks Report that ignited the forest preserve campaign. His plans were far-reaching, including boulevards, parks, beaches, and forests throughout the city and suburban Cook county. Many of these ideas were incorporated into the 1909 Daniel Burnham Plan of Chicago, and many have taken decades to come to fruition. Perkins worked closely with landscape architect Jens Jensen. The two argued for the urgency of the issue by connecting the need for parks with Chicago's atrocious living conditions, believing leisure time had a direct correlation with rates of death, disease, and crime.

== Selected works ==
In a statistical overview derived from writings by and about Dwight Perkins, the architect, OCLC/WorldCat encompasses roughly 10+ works in 20 publications in 2 languages and 100+ library holdings .

- A Metropolitan Park System for Chicago (1904)
- Educational Buildings (1925)

== Buildings ==
Image	Building	Location	Year built	Notes
	Stevens Point State Normal School	Stevens Point, Wisconsin	1894	Designed with George W. Selby. Now the current Administration Building on the University of Wisconsin–Stevens Point campus.
	Steinway Hall	Chicago, Illinois	1896	
	Charles Hitchcock Hall	Chicago, Illinois	1901	Residence hall at the University of Chicago.
	Anamosa Public Library	Anamosa, Iowa	1903	
	Dwight Perkins House	Evanston, Illinois	1904	
	Tilden Technical High School	Chicago, Illinois	1905	
	William Penn Elementary School	Chicago, Illinois	1907	
	Albert G. Lane Technical High School	Chicago, Illinois	1908	Demolished c. 1934 and replaced with current school of the same name.
	George W. Tilton Elementary School	Chicago, Illinois	1908	
	Café Brauer	Chicago, Illinois	1908	Located in the Lincoln Park Zoo.
	Cheeloo University	Jinan, Shandong, China	1909	Campus and buildings designed by Perkins, Fellows and Hamilton. Now part of Shandong University.
	Grover Cleveland Elementary School	Chicago, Illinois	1909	
	Lyman Trumbull Elementary School	Chicago, Illinois	1909	
	Carl Schurz High School	Chicago, Illinois	1910	
	James H. Bowen High School	Chicago, Illinois	1910	
	Lion House	Chicago, Illinois	1912	Located in the Lincoln Park Zoo.
	First Bank Building	South Bend, Indiana	1915	
	Northwest Tower	Chicago, Illinois	1929	
	Metropolitan Chicago YMCA Building	Near North Side, Chicago	1931	
	Texarkana United States Post Office and Courthouse	Texarkana, Arkansas	1932	In association with Witt, Seibert & Halsey.

== Sources ==
- Allen, Hannah M. (2016). "Perkins Off The Prairie: The Collected Work of Dwight H. Perkins." Thesis (M.S. in Historic Preservation ) -- School of the Art Institute of Chicago. Accessible at the School of the Art Institute of Chicago's Flaxman Library
- Cohen, Stuart and Susan Bejamin. (2004). North Shore Chicago; Houses of the Lakefront Suburbs 1890-1940. New York: Acanthus Press. ISBN 9780926494268; OCLC 237065244
- "Dwight Heald Perkins," Dictionary of American Biography, Supplement 3: 1941-1945. American Council of Learned Societies, 1973.
- Hasbrouck, Wilbert R. (2005). The Chicago Architectural Club: Prelude to the Modern. New York: Monacelli Press. ISBN 9781580931441; OCLC 470167804
