= Anamosa Public Library =

Anamosa Library & Learning Center
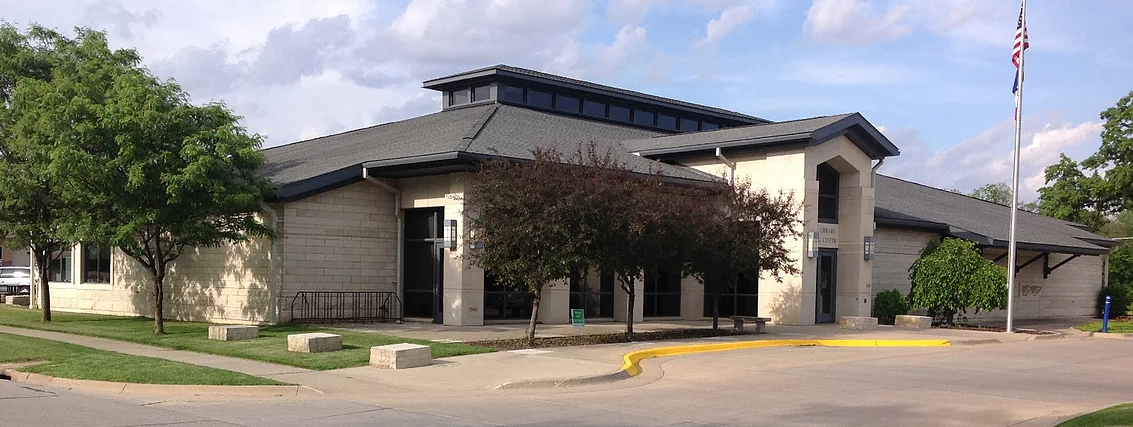
- 42°06′25.7″N 91°16′44.6″W
- Location: 600 E. First St. Anamosa, Iowa, United States
- Type: Public
- Established: 1903

Other information
- Director: Erin Rush
- Website: www.anamosalibrary.org
- Anamosa Public Library
- U.S. National Register of Historic Places
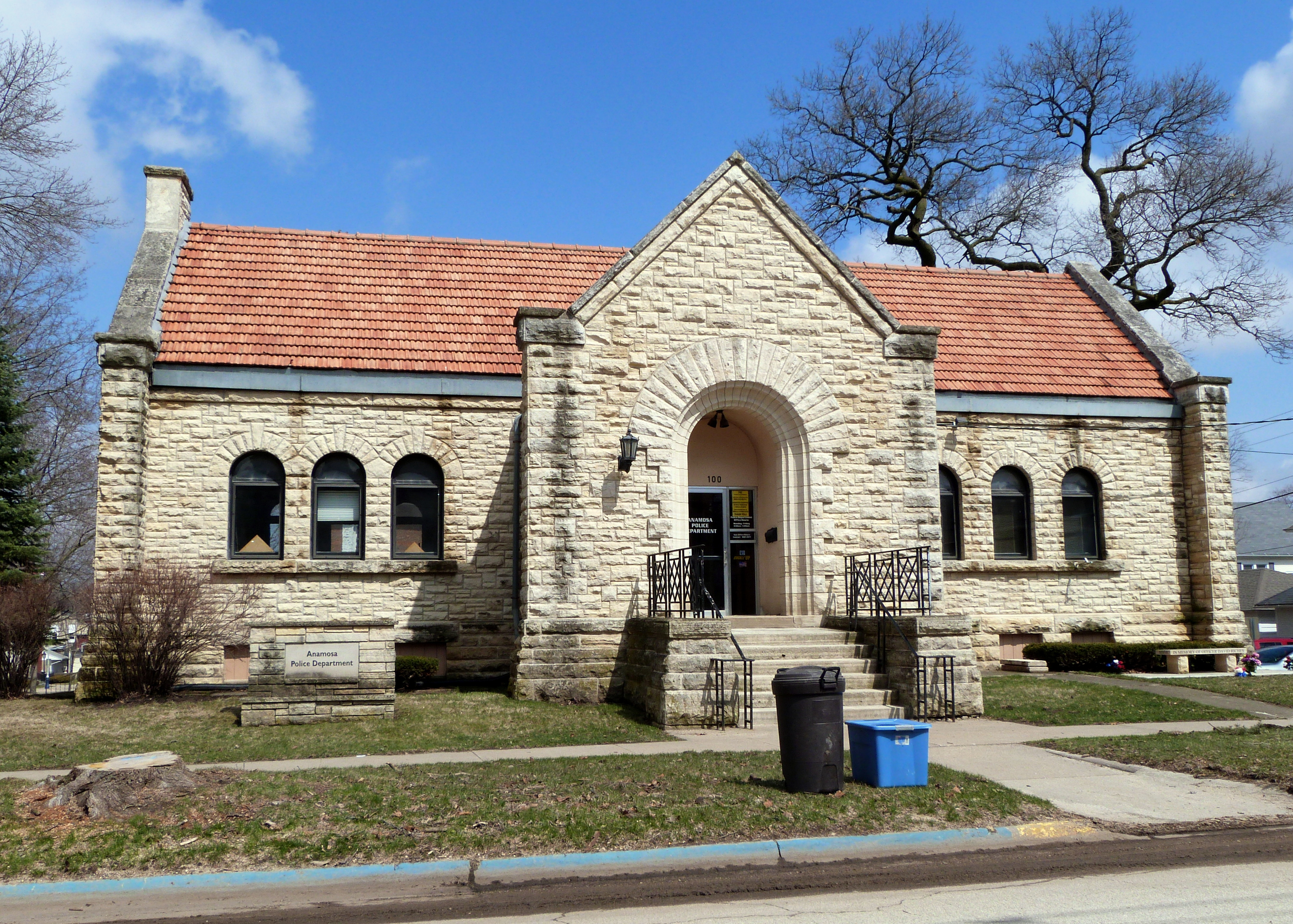

- Location within Iowa Location within the United States
- Location: 100 E. 1st St. Anamosa, Iowa
- Coordinates: 42°06′23.8″N 91°17′07.1″W
- Area: less than one acre
- Built: 1902-1903
- Architect: Dwight H. Perkins
- Architectural style: Romanesque Revival
- MPS: Public Library Buildings in Iowa TR
- NRHP reference No.: 83000380
- Added to NRHP: May 23, 1983

The Anamosa Library & Learning Center, formerly the Anamosa Public Library, is located in Anamosa, Iowa, United States. The original building, built in 1903, was listed on the National Register of Historic Places in 1983. A new facility, with triple the floor space of the old, was opened to the public in 2004.

== History ==
The public library had its beginnings in 1900 when former resident Walter S. Benton bequeathed $10,000 to buy library books if the city built a library building by 1903. The city and the estate failed to reach an agreement, so the Francis Shaw Chapter of the Daughters of the American Revolution took over leadership of the effort and raised the necessary funds. Chicago architect Dwight H. Perkins designed the single-story Romanesque Revival-style building that was built of native limestone. The side-gabled structure featured a reading room on one side of the building and the book stacks on the other. A delivery desk was located in the center.

By the 1990s the historic building was becoming too small and technologically insufficient. Ernest J. Buresh, formerly of Anamosa, donated the property for a new library, and the Buresh family also offered $500,000 towards a new library contingent on the community raising a million dollars by December 2002. OPN Architects of Cedar Rapids designed the new 12,000-square-foot (1,100 m^{2}) building. The necessary funds were raised without a bond referendum. The present library building, also composed of native limestone, was opened on November 8, 2004. The original building now houses the Anamosa Police Department.
