= Lucy Fitch Perkins =

American children's book illustrator and writer (1865–1937)

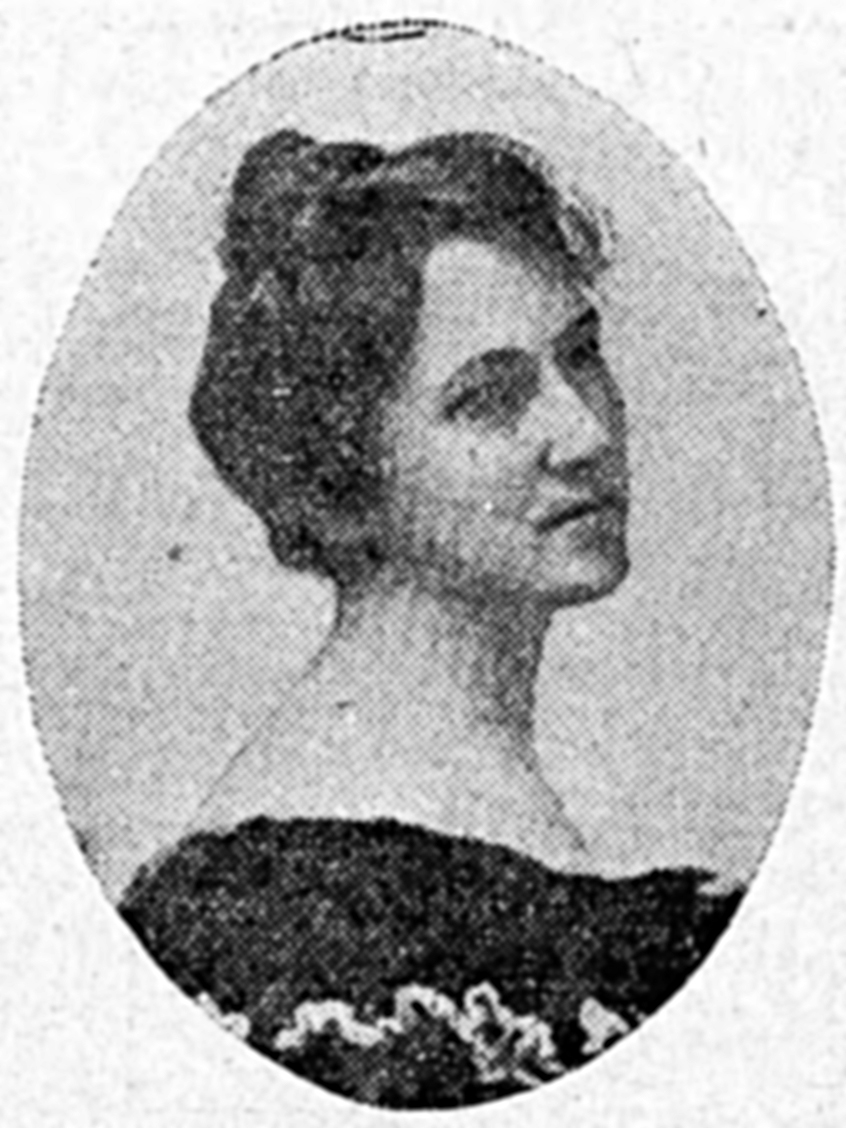
- Born: July 12, 1865; Maples, Indiana
- Died: March 18, 1937 (aged 71); Pasadena, California
- Education: School of the Museum of Fine Arts
- Occupations: Illustrator; author
- Spouse: Dwight H. Perkins (m. 1891)

Lucy Fitch Perkins (July 12, 1865 – March 18, 1937) was an American illustrator and writer of children's books, known best for Dutch Twins (1911) and its sequels, the Twins series.

== Biography ==
Lucy Fitch was born on July 12, 1865, in Maples, Indiana, to Appleton Howe and Elizabeth (née Bennett) Fitch. Her father was a teacher who moved to Maples to co-found a barrel stave factory. Her mother was a teacher. Fitch moved with her mother to Hopkinton, Massachusetts, to live with her father's parents as her father tried to recover from a financial setback from the Panic of 1873. Unhappy with the Hopkinton schools, the family moved to Kalamazoo, Michigan, in 1879.

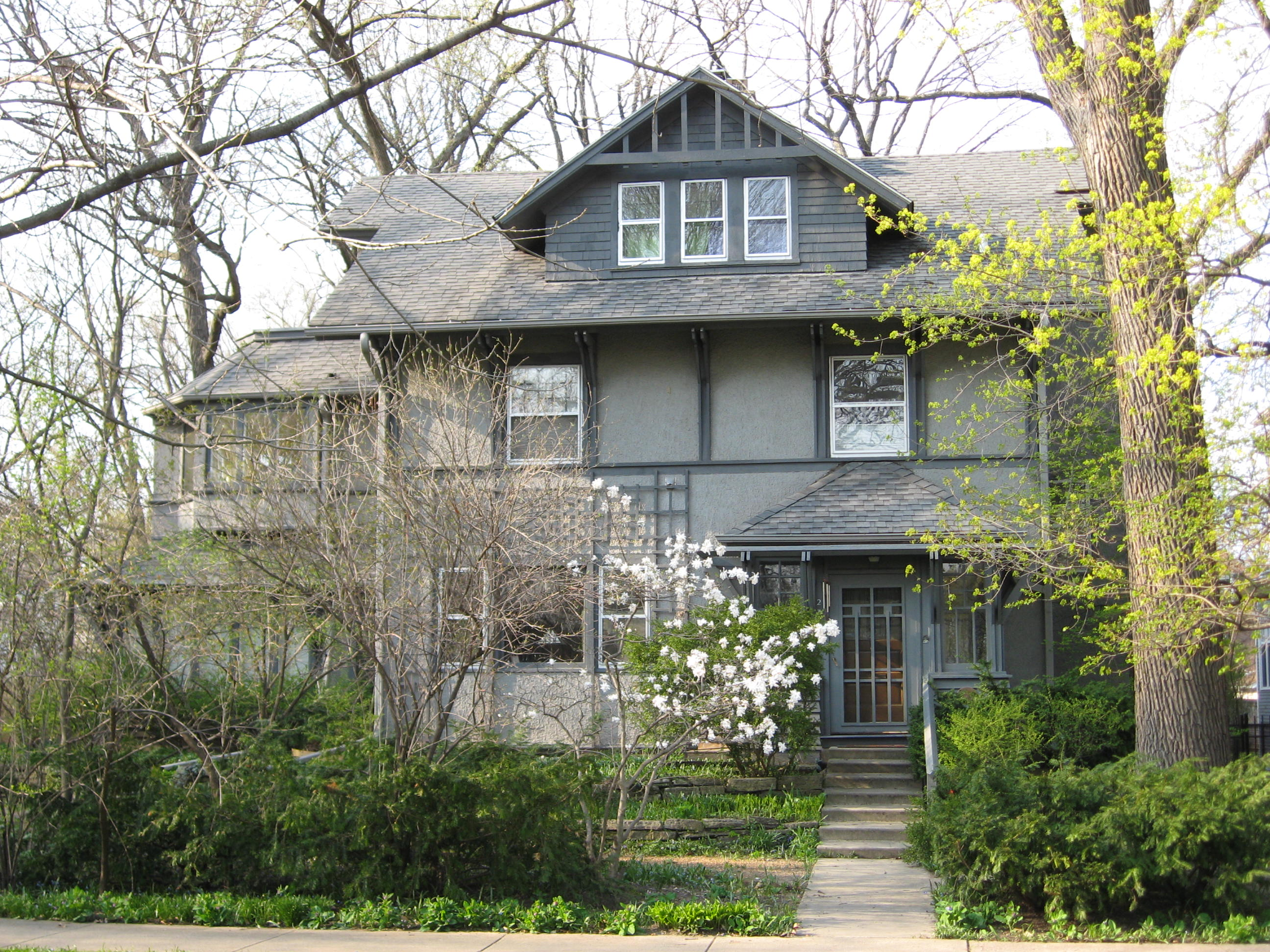
Perkins' house in Evanston, Illinois, designed by husband Dwight H. Perkins

Fitch graduated from high school in 1883 and moved to Boston, Massachusetts, to attend the School of the Museum of Fine Arts. She met Dwight H. Perkins in her third year at the school. Fitch started to write children's fiction on a freelance basis for Young Folks. She graduated in 1886 and took a job as an illustrator for the Prang Educational Company of Boston. A year later, she followed Walter Scott Perry to the Pratt Institute in Brooklyn, New York, to become his assistant. Fitch left on August 18, 1891, to marry Perkins and move to Chicago, Illinois.

She initially tended to the household, writing only on occasion. However, after her husband struggled in the aftermath of the Panic of 1893, Perkins began to write to supplement the family income. The Chicago office of the Prang Educational Company employed Perkins for the next 10 years, offering her opportunities to teach and illustrate. In 1905, her husband was appointed chief architect for the Chicago Board of Education, allowing them to support the construction of a new house in Evanston, Illinois.

In 1906, Perkins published her first work, The Goose Girl, a collection of children's rhymes. A year later, she followed with A Book of Joys: A Story of a New England Summer, but both works had limited popular appeal. In 1911, she published The Dutch Twins, her first major work. The book was inspired by friend Edwin Osgood Grover, who saw a picture Perkins drew of a pair of Dutch children. Grover suggested to Perkins that she design a series centered around the twins. Perkins took the advice, and the Twins series were a popular success. She published 26 books in the Twins series for the Houghton Mifflin Company. For each book, Perkins tried to interview someone who grew up in the country to understand the particular customs. In later books in the series, such as The American Twins of the Revolution, history supplanted geography as the basis of the twins' backgrounds.

Perkins sold more than 2 million copies of her books and was Houghton Mifflin's most profitable author. Her final book, The Dutch Twins and Little Brother, was published posthumously in 1938. She died in Pasadena, California, of a heart attack from coronary thrombosis on March 18, 1937; she had recently moved there with her husband in an effort to restore her health. Perkins had two children: Eleanor Ellis, a writer, and Lawrence Bradford, an architect.

Perkins' book The Dutch Twins inspired children's author Beverly Cleary to start reading.

Perkins also provided illustrations for Edith Ogden Harrison's series of fairy tales, published in the early years of the 20th century.

A public school in the Big Oaks neighborhood of Chicago was named after Perkins. The school was built for K-6 students. When it opened, there was an oil painting of Perkins displayed in the hallway near the main entrance. The school and property were later sold and the block was developed with single family homes.

== Selected works ==
- Prince Silverwings and Other Fairy Tales, written by Edith Ogden Harrison (McClurg, 1902) – first of several collaborations with Harrison
- The Goose Girl: A mother's lap book of rhymes and pictures (McClurg, 1906)
- Robin Hood; His Deeds and Adventures as Recounted in the Old English Ballads (Frederick A. Stokes Company, 1906)

Before beginning the Twins series Perkins illustrated, and sometimes contributed as editor or writer, to new editions of Aesop's fables, Anderson and Grimm fairy tales, Hawthorne's classical mythology, and Robin Hood.

=== Twins series (complete) ===
Geographical series

- The Dutch Twins (1911)
- The Japanese Twins (1912)
- The Irish Twins (1913)
- The Eskimo Twins (1914)
- The Mexican Twins (1916)
- The Belgian Twins (1917)
- The French Twins (1918)
- The Scotch Twins (1919)
- The Italian Twins (1920)
- The Swiss Twins (1922)
- The Filipino Twins (1923)
- The Farm Twins (1928)
- The Pickaninny Twins (1931)
- The Chinese Twins (1934)
- The Norwegian Twins (1933)
- The Spanish Twins (1934)
- The Dutch Twins and Little Brother (1938)
- The Dutch Twins Primer

Historical series

- The Cave Twins (1915)
- The Spartan Twins (1918)
- The Puritan Twins (1921)
- The Colonial Twins of Virginia (1924)
- The American Twins of 1812 (1925)
- The American Twins of The Revolution (1926)
- The Pioneer Twins (1927)
- The Indian Twins (1938)
