= Bradford Perkins (architect) =

American architect

- Born: Lawrence Bradford Perkins; January 13, 1943 (age 83); Chicago, Illinois
- Education: Cornell University, Bachelor of Arts; City College of New York, Bachelor of Architecture; Stanford University, Master of Business Administration
- Occupation: Architect
- Website: https://www.perkinseastman.com

Lawrence Bradford Perkins, FAIA, MRAIC, AICP, also known as "Bradford" or "Brad Perkins,” is the founding partner of Perkins Eastman, an international architecture, interior design, urban design, planning, landscape architecture and project management firm, based in New York.

Prior to forming Perkins Eastman, Perkins served as the Managing Partner of the New York City and Washington, D.C. offices of Perkins&Will and the New York City, Toronto, Houston, and Caracas offices of Llewelyn Davies International. He is the son of Lawrence Perkins, FAIA, co-founder of Perkins + Will and the grandson of Dwight H. Perkins, FAIA, founder of Perkins Fellows & Hamilton.

== Early life and education ==
Brad Perkins was born on January 13, 1943, in Chicago, Illinois, the son of Lawrence B. Perkins, Sr., FAIA (1907–1997) and Margery Isabella Blair Perkins (1907–1981), and was raised in the nearby suburb of Evanston, IL. Perkins attended Cornell University where he studied architecture, ancient history, and eventually graduated magna cum laude with a degree in Latin American History in 1967. Afterward Perkins enrolled in Stanford University where he received his MBA, in 1969.

== Career ==
While at Stanford and following graduation, Perkins worked as a management consultant for clients in the architecture and construction industries, including the American Institute of Architects (AIA). He also served as the President of Omnidata Services, a computer software and service bureau based in New York City, from 1972 to 1973. In 1973, Perkins joined the London-based architecture and planning firm Llewelyn Davies as the firm's Managing Partner of the New York, Toronto, Houston and Caracas offices, a post he held until 1977. From 1976 to 1977 he also served as the Managing Partner of the joint venture firm Llewelyn-Davies Davis Brody. During his time at Llewelyn Davies, Perkins worked on various projects including the master plan for the American University of Beirut; master plans for town-scale projects in Ontario, Trinidad, Iran, Egypt, and several U.S. states; the new headquarters for the ARCO Chemical Company (formerly part of the Atlantic Richfield Company); an expansion of Corning Glass Work's headquarters; and New York City's bid to host the 1984 Summer Olympics.

During this time Perkins also served as a faculty member of City College of New York (CCNY) and was a regular contributor for Architectural Record. Further, during this time Perkins completed his coursework that he began at Cornell towards earning his B.Arch at CCNY and received his architectural license.

In 1977 Perkins joined Perkins&Will as a Senior Vice President and Managing Partner of the firm's offices in the Eastern U.S. (White Plains, New York, and Washington, DC). He directed a multi-year study for HUD to determine the modernization needs and priorities of the national public housing stock.

== Perkins Eastman ==
In 1981 Perkins left Perkins&Will to join the practice of Eli Attia, which subsequently was named Attia & Perkins. The firm's projects included the new NYC headquarters for Republic National Bank on Fifth Ave. (today the New York HQ of HSBC) and Canterbury Green in Stamford, Connecticut. At the end of 1983, Perkins bought out Attia's interest in the firm and reorganized the practice as Bradford Perkins and Associates. The firm's name changed again, in 1985, to Perkins Geddis Eastman, when Barbara Geddis and Mary-Jean Eastman became partners. One of the more notable projects at this time was a Victorian-style "mutual housing" complex, comprising 70 one- to three-bedroom residential units, in Stamford, CT. By 1988 the firm had approximately 50 employees and was described in a publication as "liberal in its use of flexible work schedules and parental leaves." In 1991, Geddis stepped down, at which point the firm was renamed to Perkins Eastman.

Perkins Eastman began a period of rapid growth starting in 1994, beginning with the opening of its first regional office, in Pittsburgh, Pennsylvania, and eventually growing to about 700 employees by 2007. During this period, Perkins remained chairman and CEO yet still oversaw a number of projects. Among those where Perkins served as principal-in-charge include the Manhattan campus of Memorial Sloan-Kettering Cancer Center, the TKTS Booth in Times Square, the comprehensive master plan for Hanoi, Vietnam, the national headquarters and testing center for Consumers Union, and dozens of senior living and multi-family residential projects.

By 2015, Perkins Eastman had become the largest architecture practice in the New York City area (ranked by number of architects) and the 16th largest in the world (ranked by previous year's revenues).

== Academics and publications ==
Perkins has served as a faculty member of the College of Architecture at the City College of New York and currently works with the architectural doctoral program at the University of Hawaii. Additionally, Perkins currently serves on the faculty of Cornell's College of Architecture, Art, and Planning.

Perkins has authored articles on various architectural and planning topics, as well as several books. In addition to An Introduction to International Practice, his books include Building Type Basics for Senior Living, First and Second Edition, Architect's Essentials of Starting, Assessing, and Transitioning a Design Firm, First and Second Edition, and Building Type Basics for Elementary and Secondary Schools, First and Second Edition —all published by John Wiley & Sons. He has also contributed one or more chapters to: The Architect's Guide to Design-Build Services, Architect's Data, The Architect's Handbook of Professional Practice, Methods of Compensation for Architectural Services, Planning and Design for New Communities in Arid Regions, Healthcare Design: An Introduction, The American Bar Association's Planning and Financing School Improvement and Construction Projects, Hospitable Design for Healthcare and Senior Communities.

Perkins is a Fellow of the American Institute of Architects (FAIA), a former director of the New York Chapter of the AIA, and has served as president of the New York State Association of Consulting Planners. He is also a member of the Ontario Association of Architects, the American Planning Association, the Royal Architectural Institute of Canada, and the American Institute of Certified Planners. Perkins received the Lifetime Achievement Award from the New York Society of Architects, and the Platinum Circle Award from the Hospitality Design Association. Perkins served as Chairman of the Board of Helen Keller International (HKI), a not-for-profit that focuses on blindness prevention and nutrition in underdeveloped areas around the world.

== Selected works ==
=== Domestic healthcare, office, civic, and cultural projects ===
- Consumers Union Headquarters and National Testing Center (Yonkers, NY)
- South Norwalk Waterfront (Norwalk, CT)
- TKTS Booth and redevelopment of Father Duffy Square (New York, NY)
- The Lower East Side Tenement Museum and Visitors Center (New York, NY)
- Ithaca City Courthouse (Ithaca, NY)
- C.V. Starr Pavilion, New York Presbyterian Hospital (New York, NY)
- David H. Koch Center for Cancer Care, Memorial Sloan-Kettering (New York, NY)
- Laurence S. Rockefeller Outpatient Pavilion, Memorial Sloan-Kettering Cancer Center (New York, NY)
- International Center, Memorial Sloan-Kettering Cancer Center (New York, NY)
- Ruth and Raymond Perelman Center, Perelman School of Medicine at the University of Pennsylvania (Philadelphia, PA)

=== Domestic residential, hospitality, and senior living projects ===
- The Centria (New York, NY)
- The Beatrice and Eventi Hotel (New York, NY)
- Avalon Riverview (Queens, NY)
- Canterbury Green (Stamford, CT)
- Kendal on Hudson (Sleepy Hollow, NY)
- Christie Place (Scarsdale, NY)
- Montefiore (Beachwood, OH)
- Morse Geriatric Center (West Palm Beach, FL)

=== International ===
- Capital Construction Master Plan to 2030 and Vision to 2050 for Hanoi (Hanoi, Vietnam)
- Davidoff Comprehensive Cancer Center, Rabin Medical Center (Petah Tikva, Israel)
- Jinan South City (Jinan, Shandong Province, China)
- Praia do Forte Resort master plan (Bahia, Brazil)
- Chinese Academy of Sciences, Science City Master Plan (Beijing, China)
- Johns Hopkins Center at Nanjing University Center for Chinese and American Studies (Nanjing, Jiangsu, China)
- Shanghai International Medical Zone Master Plan (Shanghai, China)
