= Steinway Hall (Chicago) =

Building in Chicago, Illinois

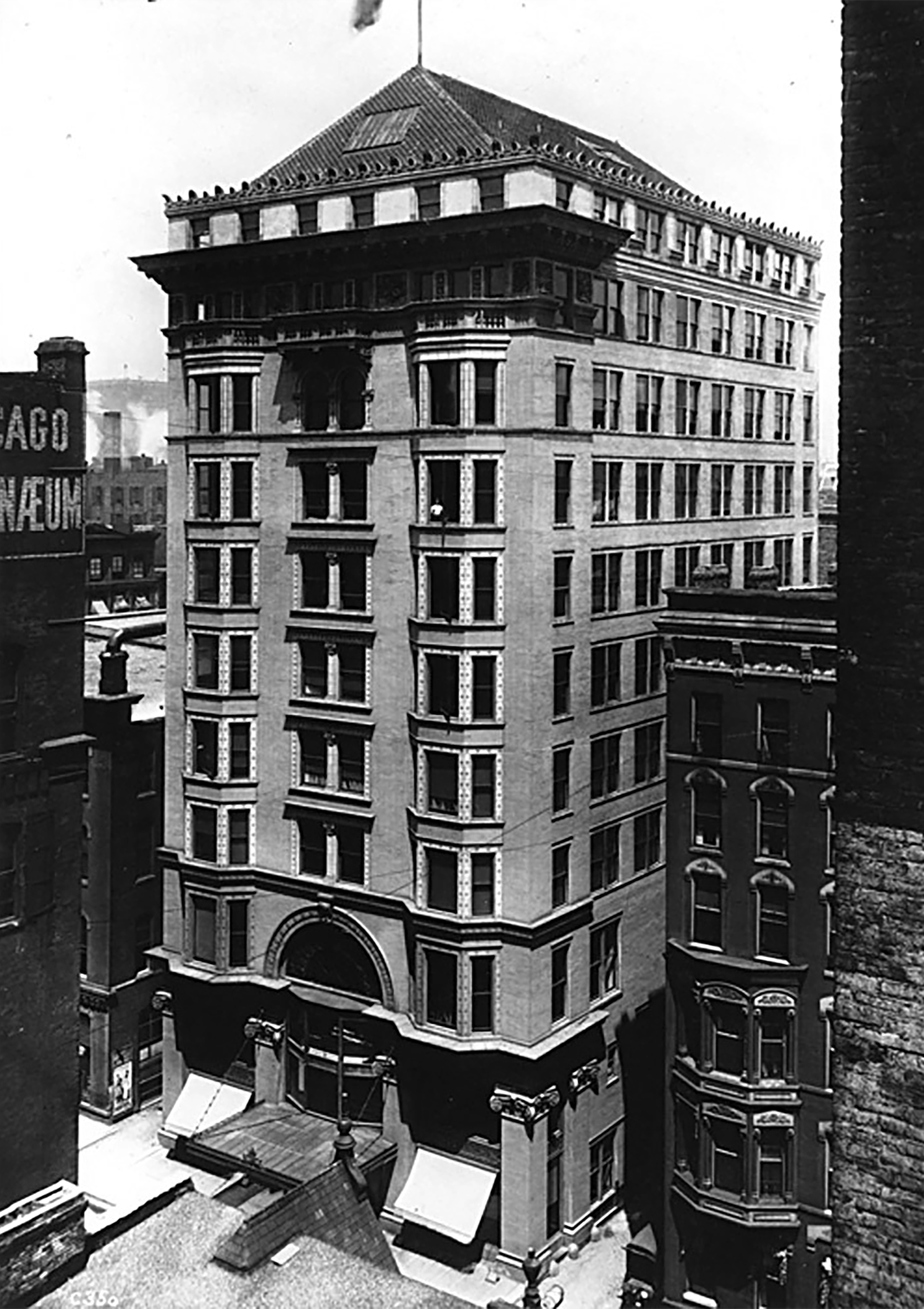
- 1896 photo from The Brickbuilder magazine.
- Interactive map of the Steinway Hall area
- Former names: Steinway Music Hall (1896–1900); Ziegfeld Hall (1900); Kelly and Leon Opera House; Whitney Opera House (1910); Central Music Hall (1915–1923); Central Theatre (1923–1930); Minturn’s Central Theatre; Barrett’s Central Theatre; Shubert’s Central Theatre; Punch & Judy Theatre (1930); Central Theatre (1931–1934); Sonotone Theatre (1934); Studio Theatre; Ziegfeld Theatre; Capri Cinema (1958–1970)

General information
- Type: Office building / indoor theater
- Location: 64 East Van Buren Street, Chicago, Illinois, United States
- Year built: 1896
- Demolished: 1970

Design and construction
- Architect: Dwight H. Perkins

Other information
- Seating capacity: 850-seat theater
- Number of stores: 11

Steinway Hall (1896 – 1970) was an 11-story office building, and ground-floor theater (later cinema), located at 64 East Van Buren Street in Chicago, Illinois. The theater had at least 14 names over the years, opening in 1896 as the Steinway Music Hall, and closing in the late 1960s as Capri Cinema. In the early 1900s, the building held the offices and nucleus of a group of famous Chicago architects that included a young Frank Lloyd Wright. These architects, inspired by the Arts and Crafts Movement and the philosophies of Louis Sullivan, formed what would become known as the Prairie School.

== Building history ==
Steinway Hall was an 11-story skyscraper designed by Dwight H. Perkins and opened in 1896. The building was built by the piano makers Steinway & Sons and the theater was one of many Steinway Halls around the world designed to showcase company products.

Beginning in the winter of 1896–97, the building's 11th floor housed the offices of a group of important architects that included Dwight H. Perkins, Robert C. Spencer, Frank Lloyd Wright and Myron Hunt. It was where Marion Mahony, one of the world's first female architects, began her career. Wright would maintain an office there until ca. 1908. The building and offices became a central location for architects including Webster Tomlinson, Irving Pond and Allen Bartlitt Pond, Adamo Boari, Walter Burley Griffin and Birch Long. The building served as the nucleus of a group of architects known as The Eighteen, a name coined by Wright to signify a group who gathered for meals to discuss matters of mutual interest. Others outside Steinway Hall who met with the group included Arthur Dean and George Dean, Hugh Garden, Arthur Heun, Alfred Hoyt Granger, Richard E. Schmidt and Howard Shaw.

In 1904, the Hobart M. Cable Piano Co. had offices and warerooms in the building.

Around 1925, the Chicago Musical College moved into the building. One hundred and twenty-five names appeared on the faculty roster for that year, and the School opened three dormitory floors for students. The college stayed there until 1954, when it merged with Roosevelt University's School of Music and moved operations to the Auditorium Building.

Steinway Hall was demolished in 1970. In its place, and all up along Wabash, was built the CNA Center (originally Continental Center III), 1970–72. This 44-story slab, designed by Graham, Anderson, Probst & White, is prominent in Chicago's skyline not only because of its 600-foot height close to Michigan Avenue, but even more so because of its redness.

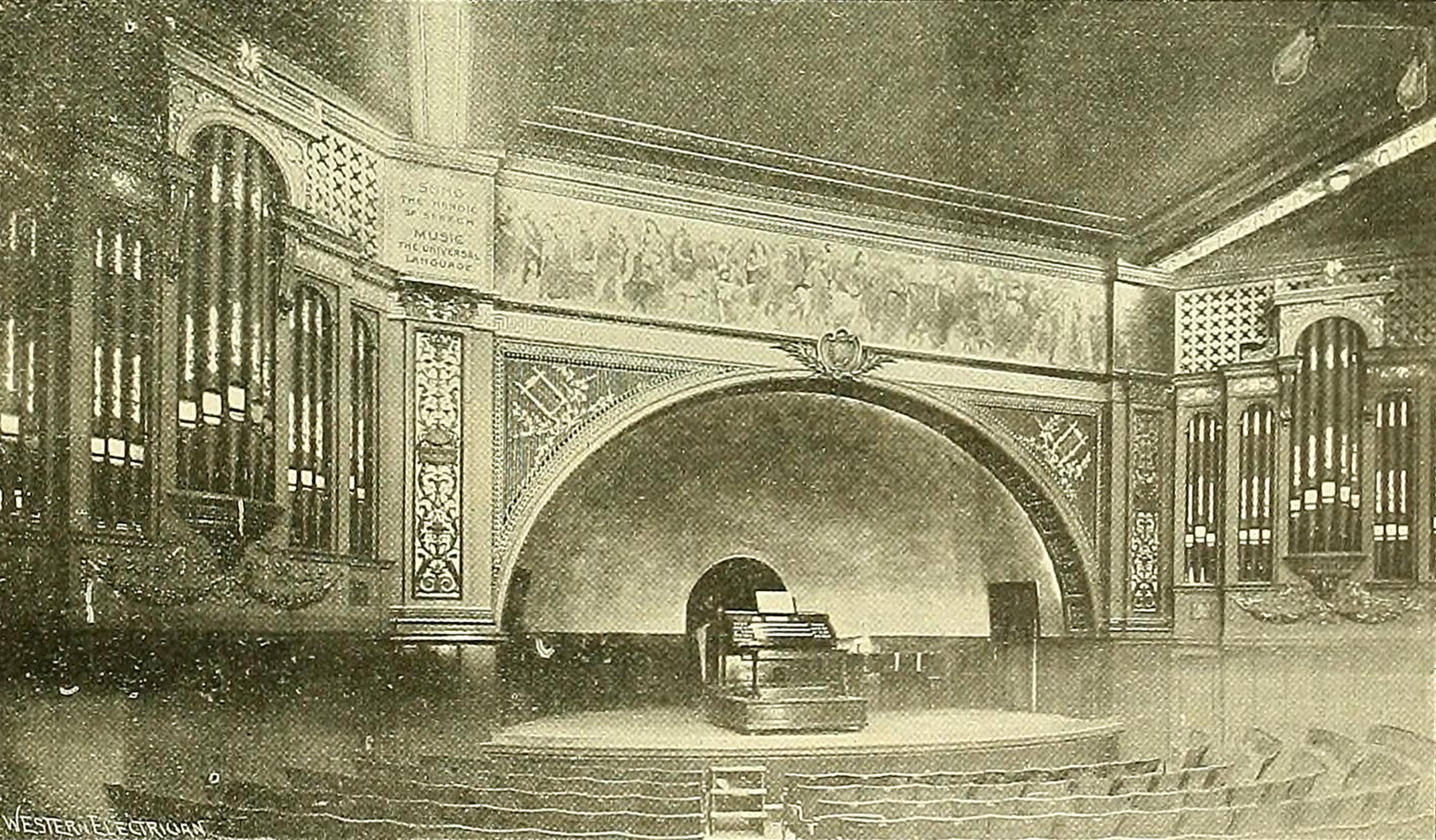
Steinway Hall stage and electric organ.

== Theater history ==
The 850-seat theater opened as the Steinway Music Hall. By 1900 the theater was renamed Ziegfeld Hall, probably leased to Florenz Ziegfeld Jr., but soon was renamed the Kelly and Leon Opera House. By 1910, it was called the Whitney Opera House, leased to B. C. Whitney. Sophie Tucker and Fatty Arbuckle were among those to appear in stage shows at the Whitney. By 1915, it was called the Central Music Hall with a program of Shakespearean plays. It should not be confused with a different Central Music Hall, designed by Dankmar Adler, that stood at the southeast corner of State and Randolph streets and was demolished in 1900. Central Music Hall was renamed to Central Theatre in 1923, with variations on that name over the next several years depending on who leased it (Minturn's Central Theatre, Barrett's Central Theatre, Shubert's Central Theatre).

In 1930 it became a movie house called the Punch & Judy Theatre. In about 1931 it was renamed back to the Central Theatre and did live performances again, but in 1934 it went back to movies and was renamed the Sonotone Theatre. It was later renamed the Studio Theatre, the Ziegfeld Theatre, and finally the Capri Cinema in 1958. Capri Cinema ran adult films towards the end, closing in the late 60s. The theater was demolished with the building in 1970.
