= Central Theater =

- U.S. National Register of Historic Places
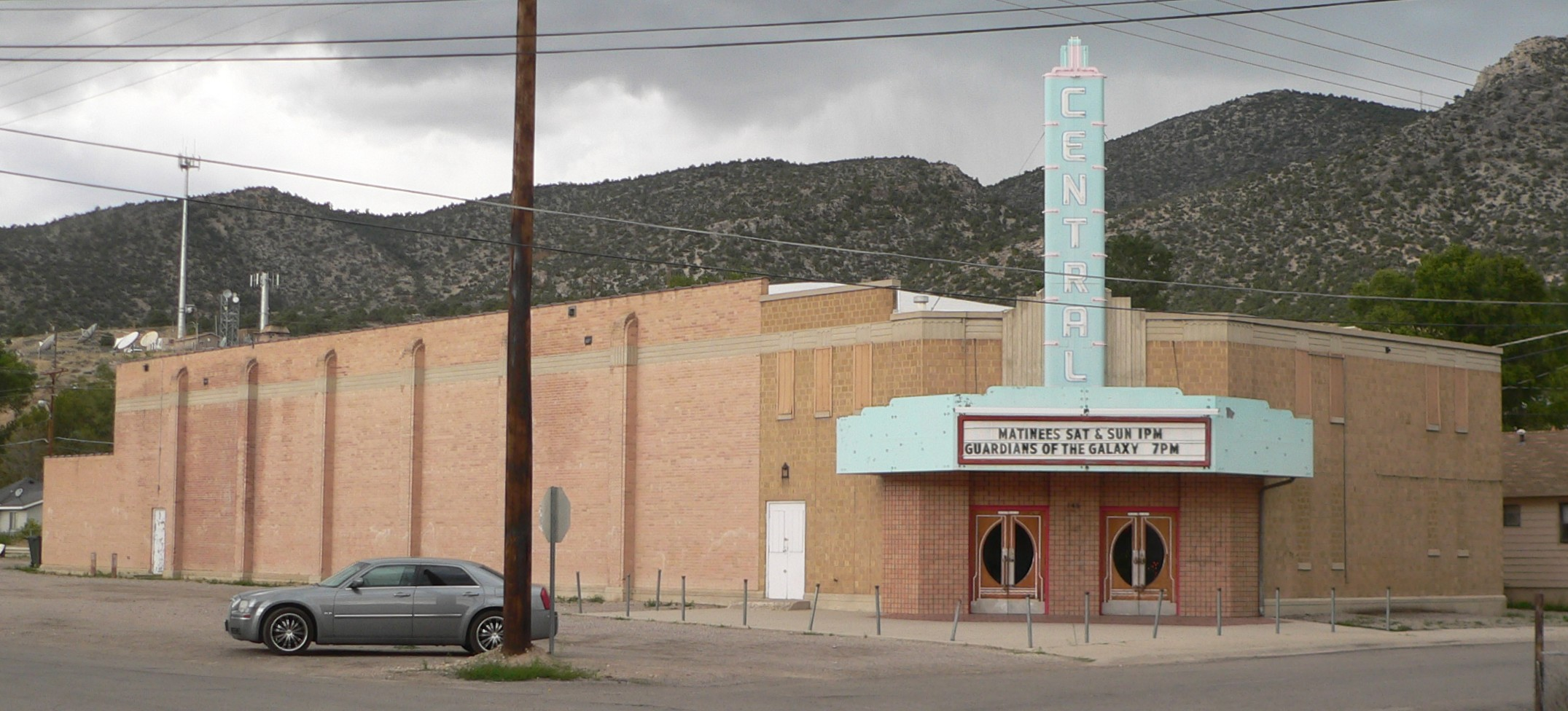

- Location within Nevada Location within the United States
- Location: 145 W. 15th St., Ely, Nevada
- Coordinates: 39°15′3.7″N 114°52′59.3″W
- Built: 1939–1941
- Architect: Hull, Percy and Warren
- Architectural style: Art Deco
- NRHP reference No.: 93000691
- Added to NRHP: August 05, 1993

The Central Theater was built in Ely, Nevada from 1939 to 1941. The Art Deco style cinema was built by Percy and Warren Hull after they were denied permission to expand Ely's Capital Theater, which opened in 1916. Originally it was built as a 725-seat theater. The Central is unusual in a town where most of the structures were built in the boom times of the early 20th century. The one story building features a vertical CENTRAL neon sign over the marquee. The interior features curved surfaces and is in a good state of preservation.

Construction began in 1939, with an ultimate cost of $80,000. The Central held its grand opening on March 29, 1941, with Arizona as its opening show. The Central was advertised as "The Finest Theater in Eastern Nevada." The Central Theater closed on February 4, 1993, and was listed on the National Register of Historic Places on August 5, 1993. The Central Theater had reopened as of 2006, but was closed in 2011, while its owners attempted to sell the building. The theater later reopened on May 25, 2012. In the weeks following its reopening, the theater experienced a large turnout of customers.

By October 2013, theater manager Chris Lani and his father-in-law, Don Purinton, announced plans to purchase the theater, which would become effective in March 2014. Lani and Purinton planned to start showing second-run films, as well as live theater shows, musical acts, and sports coverage. Lani and his brother had previously purchased the Capital Theater with plans to renovate and reopen it.

A new projection screen, as well as a digital projector and sound system, were installed in April 2014, as part of a planned renovation by Lani and Purinton. The 2016 film, The Dark Hand, includes scenes shot at the Central Theater, where the film was later premiered.
