= Central Theatre (Passaic, New Jersey) =

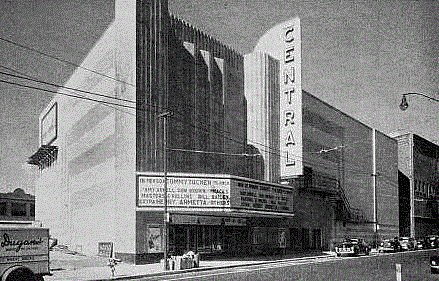
- The front of the theatre in 1941, less than a year after its opening.
- Interactive map of Central Theatre
- Location: 19 Central Ave, Passaic, NJ
- Coordinates: 40.86364°N 74.12793°W
- Capacity: 2,400

Construction
- Opened: September 10, 1941
- Closed: Late 1970s
- Demolished: Late 1970s

The Central Theatre was an entertainment venue located in the heart of Passaic, New Jersey. Designed by architects John and Drew Eberson, construction of the building was completed in September 1940.

At first, the venue's primary focus was live entertainment (such as plays and concerts), as the nearby Montauk Theatre and Capitol Theater both showed movies and offered stiff competition. Its seating capacity of a little under 2,400 seats made it suitable for these types of events. With the advent of television in the late 1940s, plays became less and less profitable, and the venue switched to solely putting on movies and concerts. The theatre had always booked some of the names biggest names in music, and it continued to do so until through the early 1970s. The venue closed in the late 1970s, and was the first of the original three Passaic theaters (Capitol, Montauk and Central) that would eventually be demolished.

A McDonald's was later built on the site the central theatre used to be at 19 Central Passaic Avenue, Passaic New Jersey.

== Notable performances ==
- Frank Sinatra - 1941-12-17
- Glenn Miller Civilian Band - 1942-09-27
- The Allman Brothers Band - 1971-09-10
- Pink Floyd - 1971-11-03
- The Beach Boys - 1971-11-12
- The Dave Clark Five - 1964-12-21
