= Snell–Hitchcock =

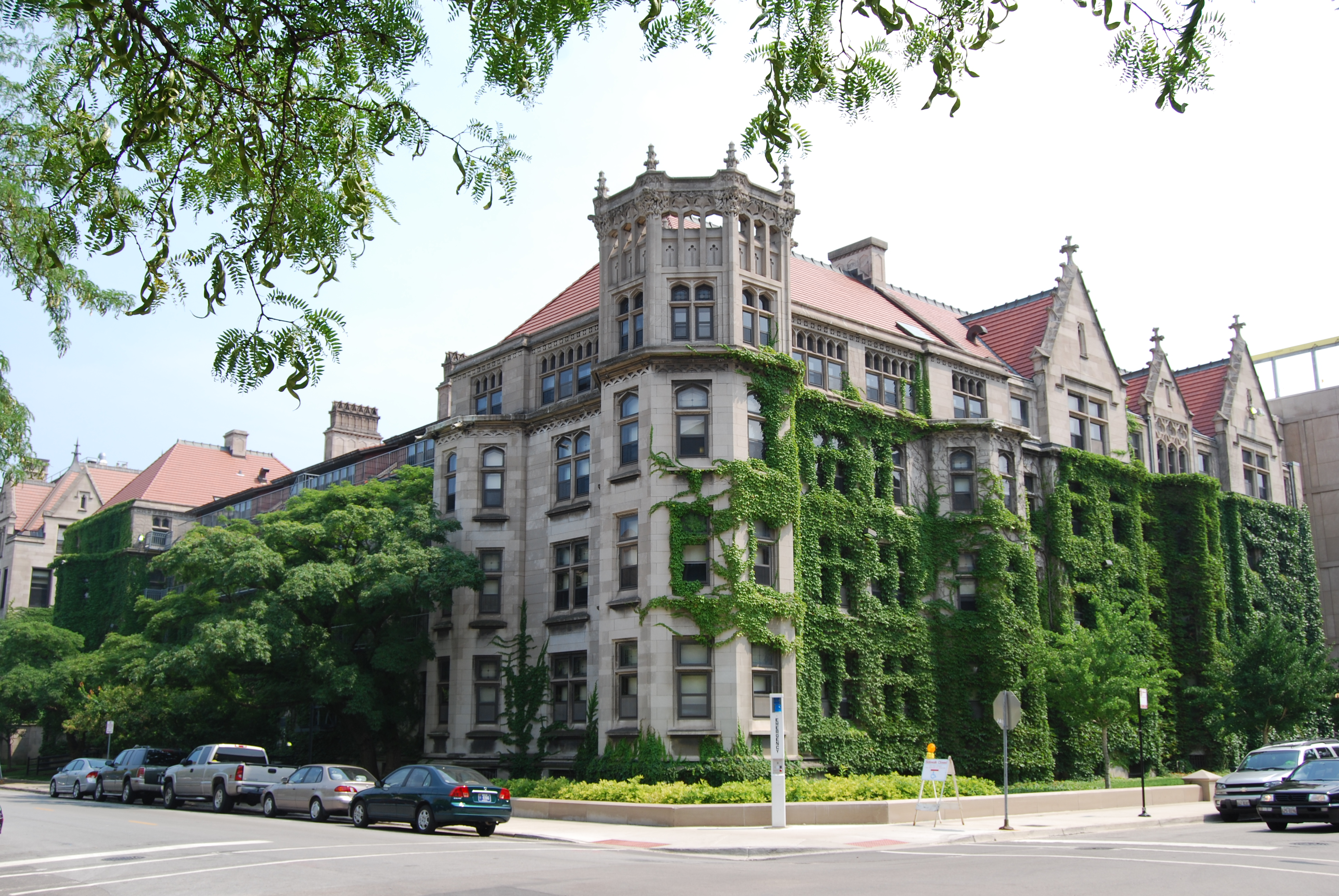
Snell-Hitchcock

Amos Jerome Snell Hall and Charles Hitchcock Hall, more commonly known as Snell–Hitchcock (colloquially Snitchcock), make up a residence hall at the University of Chicago. The dorm is on the northwest corner of the University's main quadrangles at the corner of 57th St. and Ellis Avenue. It is connected via emergency exits to Searle Chemistry Laboratory. Built in 1892 (Snell) and 1901 (Hitchcock), they are the oldest residence halls still in use as such on the university's campus. Snell is built in a Collegiate Gothic style, while Hitchcock is Prairie Style-inspired Gothic. The buildings feature fireplaces and exteriors of limestone, as well as hardwood molding and trim.

Snell–Hitchcock is known for having a high level of community spirit and involvement, which are best displayed at the annual University of Chicago Scavenger Hunt. As of 2015, the Snell–Hitchcock team has won 14 of the 29 hunts to date, and holds the longest winning streak (four years) in the history of the game.

Hitchcock House's mascot is the armadillo. Snell House's mascot is the tortoise, after being recently changed from a monkey.

== Hitchcock Hall ==
- Charles Hitchcock Hall
- U.S. National Register of Historic Places
- U.S. Historic district – Contributing property
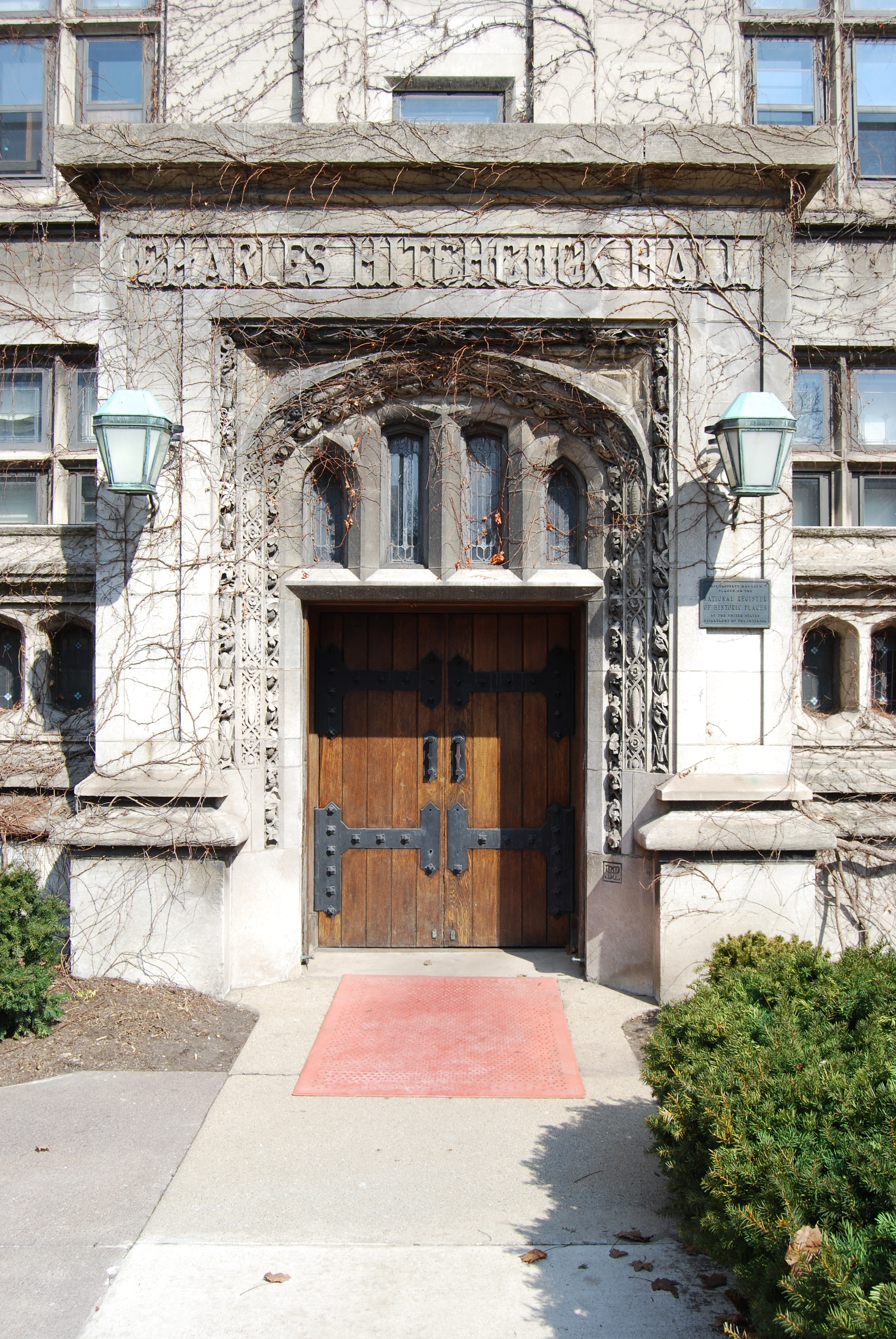
- Location: 1009 East 57th Street, Chicago, Illinois
- Coordinates: 41°47′28.16″N 87°36′2.85″W
- Built: 1901
- Architect: Dwight Heald Perkins
- Architectural style: Prairie School
- Part of: Hyde Park–Kenwood Historic District (ID79000824)
- NRHP reference No.: 74000751
- Added to NRHP: December 30, 1974

Hitchcock was built in 1901, and is listed in the National Register of Historic Places. It is built in a Collegiate Gothic style, like Snell and most of the University of Chicago's campus, but has many Prairie School elements, such as stone corn husks instead of gargoyles and flat-roofed instead of gabled dormers.

Hitchcock is built in the European "landing" style of dormitory with five stairwells linked through the front cloister and basement, though only the basement is used now in order to ensure that the building is more secure. The three interior "sections" (Sections II-IV) are each built around a single staircase. Each interior Section consists of two floors of four double-rooms with a fourth floor that has two suites (doubles with a large living room and separate bedroom). Most of the rooms have non-working fireplaces. The first floor houses the apartment for the Resident Deans, a live-in faculty couple. Traditionally, each section has had a women-only and a men-only floor, with the suite floor being either single or mixed-sex depending on the desires of the residents.

The outermost sections of Hitchcock (Sections I & V) house primarily upper-class students. They have small hallways with six to eight residents per floor, many in single rooms. Section I is the farthest from the front desk of Hitchcock and each floor is mixed-sex with a shared bathroom. It has some of the largest rooms in Hitchcock Hall, and includes several rooms known as "octagons" which are located in a turret-like structure and have many windows overlooking 57th and Ellis. The basement entrance to this section opens up into the common area that connects Snell and Hitchcock. Section I also contains "horseshoe doubles" (room #1x7), large doubles with separate niches and closets for each resident. The horseshoe doubles also have a (nonworking) fireplace and large hearth. Section I was also home to noted astronomer, Emmy award winner, and Pulitzer and Hugo award-winning author Carl Sagan in the 1954–1955 academic year.

Section V is built above the Green Room, a large lounge, which is properly known as the Charles Hitchcock Memorial Library. Unlike Section I the first two floors are alternating single-sex (female, then male) with the top floor remaining mixed-sex. Section V has some of the more unusual rooms in Hitchcock, including several which have their own names.

On the second floor of section V is the "Fermi Room," where Enrico Fermi is said to have lived while working on the Manhattan Project in the 1940s. It is rumored that he chose that room because it had its own bathroom with tub; though the bathroom remains, the tub was replaced with a shower in 2008. Linked to the Fermi Room is the Fermi Blackboard, which is said to be the same blackboard Fermi used to do his calculations, although this may be an urban legend. This possibility does not, nevertheless, detract from many students' desire to possess it.

On the fourth floor is "The Ranch" (room 541), a sprawling single which extends across the north side of the section. It overlooks the Regenstein Library and Ratner Athletic Center and on a clear day the Sears Tower can be seen in the distance. It is usually one of the most sought-after rooms in the House's annual housing lottery.

The main lounge in Hitchcock, the Green Room, is a large reading room with tiled floor, a grand piano, a working fireplace, and portraits of namesake Charles Hitchcock, benefactor Annie Hitchcock, and University of Chicago patron Daniel Shorey. Hitchcock also has a kitchen, a bike storage room, and a laundry room. Each section has its own door onto Hitchcock's cloister (known as the Arcade), but the doors are used for exiting only and all entry must be through the main entrance or from Snell. The Snell–Hitchcock front desk and mail room are located in Hitchcock's main entrance. Hitchcock has two assistant resident heads (RAs) and one set of Resident Heads, often a live-in graduate student couple.

== Snell Hall ==
Snell Hall

Built in 1892, Snell is half the size of Hitchcock, housing approximately 50 residents on four floors. It has the distinction of being one of the first women's dorms on a coeducational campus. In the beginning, it only housed women for two quarters; once the intended women's dorm opened, Snell was turned over to the men. All the rooms are singles, except for a two-room suite on the second floor. Three of the four floors are of mixed sexes, while the third floor is women-only. A co-op kitchen, laundry room, and a small recreational room are located in the basement, which connects with Hitchcock Hall. Until 2014, when it was closed, Snell residents could enter the hall through a separate door from the main hall doors. Snell's main lounge is the Tea Room, an oak-paneled room with a non-working fireplace, copious selection of periodicals and, notably to residents, a dog-eared copy of John Rechy's novel The Sexual Outlaw. Snell has one resident assistant (RA) and one set of Resident Heads, often a live-in graduate student couple.

== See also ==
- Housing at the University of Chicago
