= Sexual abuse scandal in the Roman Catholic Archdiocese of Milwaukee =

Child sexual abuse scandal

The sexual abuse scandal in the Milwaukee Archdiocese is a series of sexual-abuse cases that occurred in the Roman Catholic Archdiocese of Milwaukee, Wisconsin, US.

== Cover-ups of reports of sex abuse ==
In 1984, Archbishop Weakland responded to teachers in a Catholic school who were reporting sexual abuse by local priests by stating "any libelous material found in your letter will be scrutinized carefully by our lawyers." The Wisconsin Court of Appeals rebuked him for this, calling his remarks "abrupt" and "insensitive". In 1994, Weakland said those reporting sexual abuse were "squealing". He later apologized for the remarks.

According to the Milwaukee Journal Sentinel, a deposition released in 2009 revealed that Weakland shredded reports about sexual abuse by priests. Weakland admitted allowing priests guilty of child sex abuse to continue as priests without warning parishioners or alerting the police. Weakland stated in his autobiography that in the early years of the sexual abuse scandal he did not understand that child sexual abuse was a crime.

== 2003 report on sexual abuse ==
Following public testimony by victims before a combined session of the Wisconsin State Senate and Assembly Judiciary Committee, a report on the sexual abuse of minors by clergy in the Roman Catholic Archdiocese of Milwaukee was published in September 2003. In response, Archbishop Timothy Dolan held a meeting with victims, mental health professionals, law enforcement officers, and clergy.

Dolan helped the archdiocese avoid bankruptcy resulting from the lawsuits and closed a $3 million budget deficit in 2008. He later called the sexual abuse scandals the most challenging issue of his tenure in Milwaukee, saying "Does it haunt me? Yes it does. And I'm not afraid to admit that." Dolan said the church has made significant progress on addressing the scandal but that much work remains.

== 2011 bankruptcy filing ==
The archdiocese said that these additional cases would incur legal fees the diocese could not afford. The archdiocese has assets of about $98.4 million, but $90 million of that is already allocated. An attorney for some of the victims alleges that there were more than 8,000 cases of abuse by more than 100 staff.

== Renamed buildings ==
On March 18, 2019, it was announced that former Archbishops William Cousins and Rembert Weakland would have their names removed from buildings in the Archdiocese of Milwaukee due to their poor handling of sex abuse cases. The renaming of the offices commenced on March 22, 2019.

== Franciscan Friars controversy ==
On September 3, 2020, it was revealed that Wisconsin Franciscan Friar Paul West was extradited to Mississippi on sex abuse charges. Father James Gannon, the leader of a Wisconsin-based group of Franciscan Friars, had previously negotiated settlements for some of West's accusers in Mississippi. In addition to the Mississippi sex abuse charges, West has been charged with second-degree sexual assault of a child in Wisconsin.

== Prominent non-criminal cases ==
None of the clergy in this section were prosecuted in Wisconsin for sexual abuse crimes. In most cases, the crimes were too old to prosecute. However, the Archdiocese of Milwaukee determined that the accusations against these clergy were credible.

=== Reverend. Frederick J. Bistricky ===
Starting in 1967, Reverend Frederick J. Bistricky was serving on the staff of St. Augustine Church in Milwaukee. In 1974, several parents wrote to the archdiocese about his behavior with their teenage boys. The boys had reported that Bistricky encouraged nudity and took photographs of them. He also walked around nude himself. After receiving this information, Archbishop Cousins reprimanded Bistricky. When his inappropriate behavior continued, the archdiocese ordered him to seek counseling. However, he remained in ministry, serving in four more parishes.

The archdiocese rediscovered Bistricky's file in 1997 and Bishop Sklba restricted him from ministry and from any contact with minors. In March 2002, a man reported that Bistricky had sexually assaulted him for four years, starting in 1968. Prosecutors determined that the crime was beyond the Wisconsin statute of limitations. In November 2002, at a public meeting, Archbishop Timothy Dolan was informed that Bistricky was still celebrating mass in a parish. Dolan said he would stop that immediately. Another victim came forward in 2005.

=== Reverend Daniel A. Budzynski ===
In 1973, Reverend Daniel A. Budzynski was assigned to the pastoral staff of St. Peter Claver Parish in Sheboygan. That summer, the archdiocese received its first allegation that Budzynski had sexually abused a boy. Bishop Cousins put him on a leave of absence, then reassigned him in 1974 to St. Joseph Parish in Wauwatosa, Wisconsin. He was removed again in 1982 from Newman Parish in Stevens Point, Wisconsin and sent to a rehabilitation center for alcohol abuse and what was described as psychosexual problems.

During a psychological evaluation in 1994, Budzynski admitted to abusing 30 young boys and girls. One victim reported that when he was age seven in 1971, he forced her to perform oral sex on him in the church rectory. A second 12-year-old victim reported him fondling her genitals when they were alone in a car in the 1970s. An 18-year-old college student said that Budzynski started rubbing his chest one evening when they were consuming alcohol alone.

=== Reverend Lawrence Murphy ===
In 1950, Reverend Lawrence Murphy joined the faculty of the St. John School for the Deaf in St. Francis, Wisconsin. By 1963, he had been named its director. In 1973, the archdiocese received its first report from several former students that Murphy had sexually abused them at St. John. The position of the archdiocese was that Murphy was too important to St. John to be removed. It was also reported to local law enforcement, but they chose not to investigate it.

By early 1974, the archdiocese was receiving numerous reports about Murphy, prompting his removal as director in May 1974 and from all school ties that summer. Archbishop Cousins put him on a leave of absence, which became an indefinite suspension from ministry. The archdiocese was sued by several victims in 1975; the archdiocese settled with them. Murphy was finally evaluated by a psychotherapist in December 1993. During the interview, he admitted molesting hearing impaired boys at St. John from 1952 to 1974. Murphy died in 1998; he was never charged in any criminal case.

Several of Murphy's victims share their stories in 2006. They described being assaulted during confession and in the middle of the night. Many of them were unable to communicate with their hearing parents. Their connection to them was Murphy, who understood American Sign Language, preventing them from reaching out for help. Murphy admitted to abusing 30 boys, but some of his victims thought that was an underestimate. By March 2010, there were four lawsuits against the archdiocese regarding Murphy.

== Criminal cases ==
This is a list of several priests, a nun and a religious brother who were convicted of sexual abuse crimes in the Archdiocese of Milwaukee.

=== Reverend James L. Arimond ===
In 1989, a family notified the archdiocese that their son had been sexually abused by Reverend James Arimond when the boy was age 16 during the late 1980s. The archdiocese immediately suspended Arimond from ministry. He pleaded no contest in 1990 to fourth-degree sexual assault, a misdemeanor. He was sentenced to 18 months of probation and 45 days in the House of Correction under the work-release program.

=== Reverend Peter Burns ===
The archdiocese in 1986 assigned Reverend Peter Burns as an assistant pastor to St. Peter Claver Parish in Sheboygan, Wisconsin, his first posting since ordination. In 1987, Burns admitted to Archbishop Richard Sklba that he had fondled a 13-year-old boy from the parish. Sklba sent Burns to a therapist, but allowed him to remain at St. Peter Claver without notifying the parishioners. Burns continued to entertain young boys at the parish rectory.

In September 1991, Burns was arrested after another man came forward with sexual abuse allegations. The second victim said that when he was age 13, Burns touched his genitals during a sleepover at the St. Peter Claver rectory. After Burns' arrest, the original victim restated his original accusation. Burns pleaded no contest in 1992 to second-degree sexual assault charge on the second victim and was sentenced to nine months in jail and 10 years probation.

=== Reverend William J. Effinger ===
Beginning in 1973, the archdiocese assigned Reverend William Effinger to the pastoral staff of St. Francis De Sales Parish in Lake Geneva, Wisconsin. A parishioner at St. Francis reported to Archbishop Rembert Weakland in April 1979 that Effinger had molested their son a few days ago. A month later, Weakland received a similar report about an incident in 1977. In response, he removed Effinger from St. Francis and sent him to counseling. However, in July 1979, Effinger was assigned to a new parish, Holy Name in Sheboygan, Wisconsin, as an associate pastor.

In 1983, the vicar for clergy reported that Effinger was allowing boys on sleepovers at the Holy Name gym to drink wine and beer. The vicar also said that he was bringing some boys to his cabin on weekends. A counselor with the archdiocese advised that Effinger was abusing alcohol and needed help. He was arrested on driving under the influence (DUI) charges in 1987 and sent to a rehabilitation center in 1989. Effinger remained in ministry at Holy Name Parish.

The archdiocese in June 1992 received a second report of the two sexual abuse allegations from 1979, but did not suspend Effinger from ministry until they were reported in the news media in September 1992. He was indicted in January 1993 of second-degree sexual assault of a 14-year-old boy at Holy Name between 1987 and 1988. Effinger pleaded no contest in July 1993 and was sentenced to ten years in prison. Nine other individuals voiced accusations against Effinger after his conviction.

=== Sister Norma Giannini ===
During the 1960s, Sister Norman Giannini, a member of the Sisters of Mercy, was serving as the principal of St. Patrick Elementary School in Milwaukee. During this period, she sexually abused two boys ages 12 and 13, raping both of them. She moved to Chicago during the 1970s. After one victim reported their abuse to the archdiocese, Giannini in 1996 confessed her crimes to an archdiocesan panel. However, the archdiocese did not report them to police. In December 2006, she was charged with two counts of two felony counts of indecent behavior with a child. At that time, she admitted to sexual contact with three other underage boys in Milwaukee and one in Chicago.

Giannini pleaded no contest in November 2007 to both charges and was sentenced in February 2008 to one year in the house of correction and 10 years of probation.

=== Brother David J. Nickerson ===
In 2007, Brother David Sanders was convicted in Milwaukee of sexually assaulting a nine-year-old boy during the 1980s at St. Vincent de Paul School in Milwaukee. Known then as "Brother Dave", he was positively identified by the victim as the perpetrator. Declaring his innocence, Sanders was sentenced to 15 years in prison. However, the victim's grandmother soon discovered a letter from the 1980s that identified a second "Brother Dave" – David Nickerson, a member of the Little Brothers of the Good Shepherd. When investigators questioned Nickerson in California, he admitted to the crime. Sanders was freed after five months in prison. In 2009, Nickerson pleaded guilty to third-degree sexual assault and was sentenced in January 2010 to five years in prison.

=== Reverend Michael E. Nowak ===
In May 2011, the parents of a 14-year-old girl reported to police that Reverend Michael E. Nowak, pastor at St. Theresa of Liseiux Parish in Kenosha, had made sexually explicit remarks to her during a phone conversation that week. When the incident became public, a 17-year-old girl made a similar accusation against Nowak. She said that Nowak had taken her out to a movie, then later called her asking for another "date". Later in May, Nowak was charged with two counts of unlawful use of a telephone, both misdemeanors. In July 2011, Nowak pleaded guilty in a plea bargain; he was sentenced to 30 days in jail and one year on probation.

=== Reverend John O'Brien ===
During the 1990s, Reverend John O'Brien was serving a pastoral role at Presentation Parish in North Fond du Lac, Wisconsin. In May 1999, he started counseling a 17-year-old boy who was troubled after motorcycle/bicycle accident. While meeting O'Brien's apartment, the priest told the boy to strip naked; O'Brien then started fondling his genitals. In November 2000, O'Brien pleaded no contest to fourth-degree sexual assault; the judge fined him $1,000 and order him to attend psychiatric counseling.

=== Reverend Dennis A. Pecore ===
Reverend Dennis A. Pecore, a priest of the Society of the Divine Savior. came to Milwaukee in 1986 to serve on the pastoral staff of Our Mother of Good Counsel Parish. Records later showed that three teachers at the school wrote to Archbishop Weakland warning him about Pecore. Weakland responded to one teacher with a legal threat. In June 1987, Pecore was charged with sexually assaulting a 15-year-old boy from the parish school. Pecore was sentenced in September 1987 to one year in prison and five years of probation. He was allowed work release from prison to attend university classes. The archdiocese settled a lawsuit by the victim in 1988 for $595,000.

After his release from prison, Pecore was assigned by Salvadorians as a live-in coordinator at Jordan House, their residence for retired priests in Milwaukee. During this period, Pecore started sexually assaulting his nine-year-old nephew, Nick Janovsky, at Jordan House. In March 1994, after being convicted of assaulting Janovsky, Pecore was sentenced to 12 years in prison.

=== Reverend Simon Palathingal ===
A member of the Salesians of Don Bosco, Reverend Simon Palathingal arrived from India in Milwaukee around 1990 to study journalism at Marquette University. During this period, he was residing at Jordan House in Milwaukee, a facility for retired priests. While there, Reverend Dennis A. Pecore introduced Palathingal to his nephew, nine-year-old Nick Janovsky. Pecore had been sexually abusing the boy and Palathingal started abusing him also.

When started receiving reports about Palathingal, he returned to India. No charges were filed against him. In 2004, Janovski again went to police with his allegations against Palathingal. In June 2004, he was arrested in South Amboy, New Jersey, and brought back to Wisconsin. He pleaded guilty in September 2004 to two counts of first-degree sexual assault of a child. Palathingal was sentenced in November 2004 to 16 years in prison, with the chance of parole after four years.

=== Reverend Siegfried Widera ===
In 1972, Reverend Siegfried Widera joined the pastoral staff at St. Mary Parish in Port Washington, Wisconsin. The next year, he was convicted of sexual perversion for the molestation of an 11-year-old boy at St. Mary. During his interviews with police, he admitted to molesting other boys. After Widera received counseling, the diocese reassigned him later in 1973 to St. Andrew Parish in Delavan, Wisconsin. No one informed the parishioners at St. Andrew about Widera's criminal record.

In September 1976, the archdiocese was informed by a therapist that his patient, a boy from St. Andrew, had been sexually abused by Widera. The archdiocese told the therapist that they would sent Widera to an inpatient treatment facility and that the boy's mother should not contact police. Widera remained at St. Andrew for six more weeks, then went to Southern California to visit a relative. In January 1977, Bishop William Robert Johnson from the Diocese of Orange in California contacted Archbishop William Edward Cousins, asking about having Widera minister in his diocese. Cousins minimized Widera's problems and Cousins agreed to take him. However, Widera would remain under the jurisdiction of the Archdiocese of Milwaukee.

During the 1980s, Widera was accused of sexually assaulting several boys in California. He fled to Mexico in 2002 to avoid prosecution and committed suicide to avoid extradition to the United States. In September 2006, the archdiocese made a $16 million financial settlement with ten victims of sexual abuse by Widera in California.

== See also ==
- Child sexual abuse
- Religious abuse
- Sexual misconduct
- Spiritual abuse
- Mea Maxima Culpa: Silence in the House of God
