= James T. Schuerman =

American prelate

His Excellency, The Most Reverend James Thomas Schuerman
- Auxiliary Bishop of Milwaukee; Titular Bishop of Girba
- Archdiocese: Milwaukee
- Appointed: January 25, 2017
- Installed: March 17, 2017
- Other post: Titular Bishop of Girba

Orders
- Ordination: May 17, 1986 by Rembert Weakland
- Consecration: March 17, 2017 by Jerome E. Listecki, Donald J. Hying, and Richard J. Sklba

Personal details
- Born: April 5, 1957 (age 69) Burlington, Wisconsin
- Education: Saint Francis de Sales Seminary College; University of Innsbruck; Catholic Theological Union
- Motto: Christus lux nostra English: "Christ Our Light"

Styles of James Thomas Schuerman
- Reference style: His Excellency; The Most Reverend
- Spoken style: Your Excellency
- Religious style: Bishop

James Thomas Schuerman (born April 5, 1957) is an American prelate of the Roman Catholic Church who has been serving as auxiliary bishop of the Archdiocese of Milwaukee in Wisconsin since 2017.

== Biography ==
=== Early life ===
Born on April 5, 1957, in Burlington, Wisconsin, to Robert and Elizabeth Schuerman, James Schuerman grew up in Lyons, Wisconsin. He was a member of St. Joseph Parish and attended St. Joseph's Grade School, Burlington Junior High School, and Burlington High School. Schuerman has four siblings: Virginia Kalaveshi, Robert Schuerman, Jr., Theresa Schuerman and David Schuerman.

After deciding to become a priest, Schuerman entered Saint Francis de Sales Seminary College in Milwaukee in 1976, earning a bachelor's degree in 1980. After one more year at Saint Francis, Schuerman traveled to Innsbruck, Austria to attend the University of Innsbruck. He earned his Master of Theology degree at the university.

=== Priesthood ===
On May 17, 1986, Schuerman was ordained to the priesthood at the Cathedral of St. John the Evangelist in Milwaukee for the Archdiocese of Milwaukee by Archbishop Rembert Weakland.

After his 1986 ordination, the archdiocese assigned Schuerman as associate pastor at St. Anthony Parish in Milwaukee. In 1992, Schuerman traveled to the archdiocesan sister parish, La Sagrada Familia in the Dominican Republic to serve as a missionary.

In August 1996, after returning to the United States, Schuerman enrolled in a graduate program at Catholic Theological Union in Chicago for returning missionaries. He received a Doctor of Ministry degree in spirituality. In 1997, he joined the faculty of Saint Francis de Sales Seminary as spiritual director and faculty member.

In 2009, Schuerman left Saint Francis to become administrator of St. Andrew Parish in Delavan, Wisconsin, and then pastor at St. Andrew Parish in 2010. From 2011 to 2012, he also served as pastor of St. Patrick Parish in Elkhorn, Wisconsin. In 2012, Schuerman became pastor of St. Francis de Sales Parish in Lake Geneva, Wisconsin, and administrator of Holy Cross Parish in Bristol, Wisconsin. He continued his role in priest formation, serving as adjunct spiritual director for Saint Francis de Sales Seminary. Schuerman received the archdiocesan Vatican II Award for Service to the Priesthood in 2012.

=== Auxiliary Bishop of Milwaukee ===
Pope Francis appointed Schuerman as an auxiliary bishop of Milwaukee on January 25, 2017. On March 17, 2017, Schuerman was consecrated as a bishop by Archbishop Jerome E. Listecki, with Bishops Donald J. Hying and Richard J. Sklba serving as co-consecrators.

Schuerman speaks German and is fluent in Spanish.

== See also ==
- Catholic Church hierarchy
- Catholic Church in the United States
- Historical list of the Catholic bishops of the United States
- List of Catholic bishops of the United States
- Lists of patriarchs, archbishops, and bishops

Catholic Church titles
Preceded by -	Auxiliary Bishop of Milwaukee; 2017-Present	Succeeded by -
