= Jeffrey Robert Haines =

American prelate

His Excellency, The Most Reverend Jeffrey Robert Haines
- Auxiliary Bishop of Milwaukee; Titular Bishop of Thagamuta
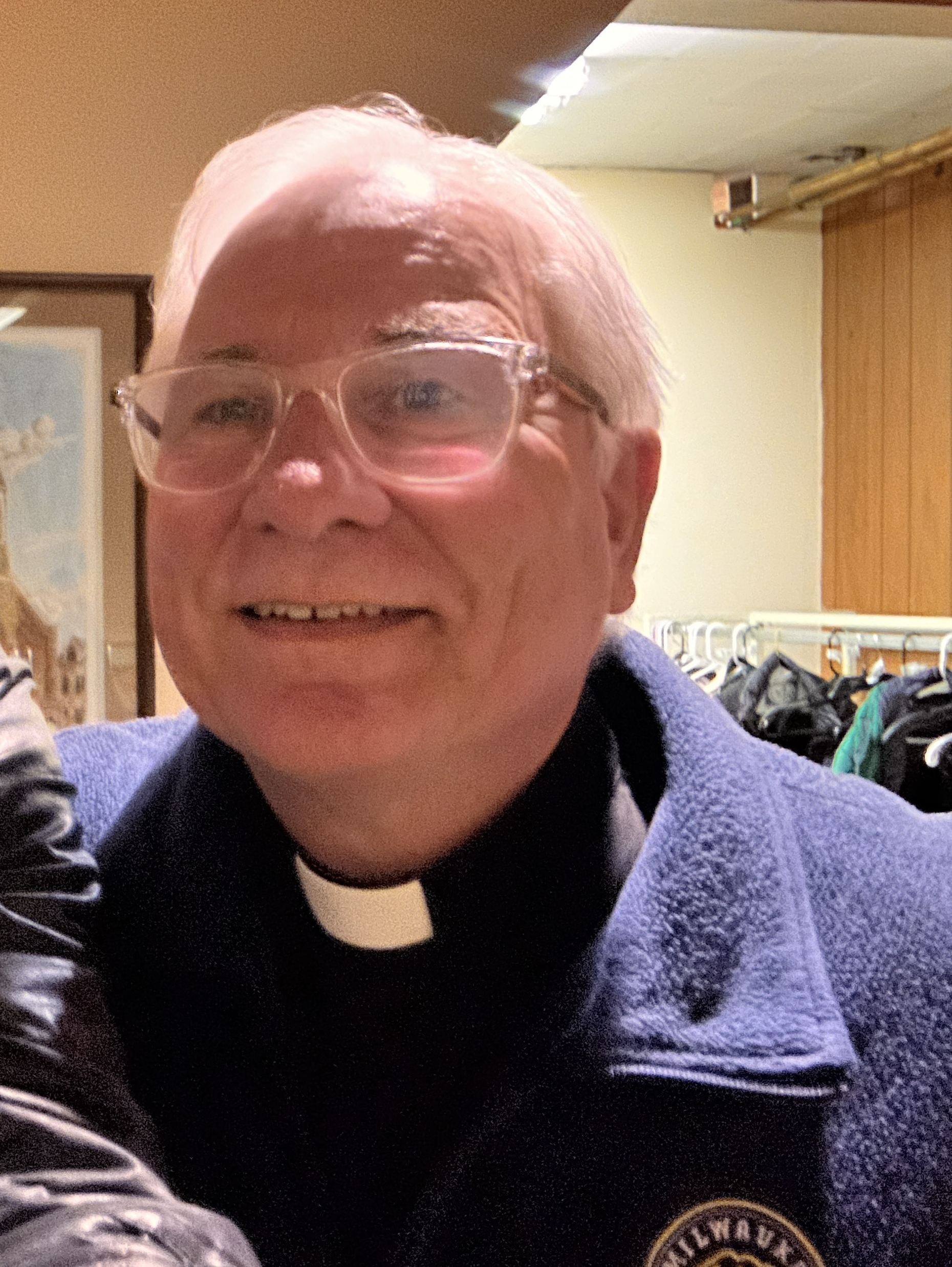
- Jeffery R. Haines in 2024
- Church: Catholic Church
- Archdiocese: Milwaukee
- Appointed: January 25, 2017
- Installed: March 17, 2017
- Other post: Titular Bishop of Thagamuta

Orders
- Ordination: May 17, 1985 by Rembert Weakland
- Consecration: March 17, 2017 by Jerome E. Listecki, Donald J. Hying, and Richard J. Sklba

Personal details
- Born: October 6, 1958 (age 68) Milwaukee, Wisconsin
- Education: University of Wisconsin-Oshkosh; Marquette University; Saint Francis de Sales Seminary; Catholic University of America
- Motto: And behold I am with you always

Styles of Jeffrey Robert Haines
- Reference style: His Excellency; The Most Reverend
- Spoken style: Your Excellency
- Religious style: Bishop

Jeffrey Robert Haines (born October 6, 1958) is an American prelate of the Catholic Church who has been serving as an auxiliary bishop of the Archdiocese of Milwaukee in Wisconsin since 2017. He also served as rector of the Cathedral of St. John the Evangelist in Milwaukee from 2011 to 2023.

== Biography ==
=== Early life ===
Jeffrey Haines was born in Milwaukee, Wisconsin, on October 6, 1958, to Jim and Maureen (“Mo”) Haines. He has three siblings, John, Rick, and Anne. Haines was baptized at St. Elizabeth Church in Milwaukee before the family moved to New Berlin, Wisconsin, in 1965. Haines attended Holy Apostles School in New Berlin, and then New Berlin West High School. He graduated from high school in 1977.

Haines began his college studies at the University of Wisconsin-Oshkosh before transferring to Marquette University. He graduated from Marquette in 1981 with a Bachelor of Theology degree. Haines then attended Saint Francis de Sales Seminary in St. Francis, Wisconsin, earning a Master of Divinity degree there in 1985.

=== Priesthood ===
On May 17, 1985, Haines was ordained to the priesthood at the Cathedral of Saint John the Evangelist for the Archdiocese of Milwaukee by Archbishop Archbishop Weakland.

After his 1985 ordination, the archdiocese appointed Haines as associate pastor of St. Nicholas Parish in Milwaukee. In 1987, he was also named as associate pastor of Holy Redeemer Parish in Milwaukee. Haines left the two Milwaukee parishes in 1991 to become associate pastor of St. Eugene Parish in Fox Point, Wisconsin. Haines was appointed pastor in 1996 of St. Frances Cabrini Parish in West Bend, Wisconsin.

Haines went to Washington D.C. in 2002 to study canon law at Catholic University of America. Returning to Milwaukee the next year, the archdiocese posted him as temporary administrator of St. Patrick Parish in Whitewater, Wisconsin. In 2003, Haines returned as pastor to St. Frances Cabrini Parish, then in 2004 also appointed to assist at Immaculate Conception/St. Mary’s Parish in West Bend. In 2011, Haines became rector of the Cathedral of St. John the Evangelist in Milwaukee. He was elected three times as moderator of the archdiocesan council of priests and has served on the college of consultors.

=== Auxiliary Bishop of Milwaukee ===
Pope Francis appointed Haines as an auxiliary bishop for the Archdiocese of Milwaukee on January 25, 2017. On March 17, 2017, Haines was consecrated by Archbishop Jerome Listecki at the Cathedral of St. John the Evangelist, with Bishop Donald J. Hying, and Auxiliary Bishop Richard J. Sklba serving as co-consecrators Haines served as rector and pastor of the Cathedral Parish from 2011 to 2023.

Haines occasionally makes what he terms as “pilgrimages” to Miller Park in Milwaukee to watch the Milwaukee Brewers Major League Baseball team. He also enjoys traveling to the Grand Ole Opry in Nashville, Tennessee, to listen to country music.

== See also ==
- Catholic Church hierarchy
- Catholic Church in the United States
- Historical list of the Catholic bishops of the United States
- List of Catholic bishops of the United States
- Lists of patriarchs, archbishops, and bishops

Catholic Church titles
Preceded by -	Auxiliary Bishop of Milwaukee; 2017-Present	Succeeded by -
