= William P. Callahan =

Catholic bishop

His Excellency, The Most Reverend William Patrick Callahan O.F.M. Conv.
- Bishop Emeritus of La Crosse
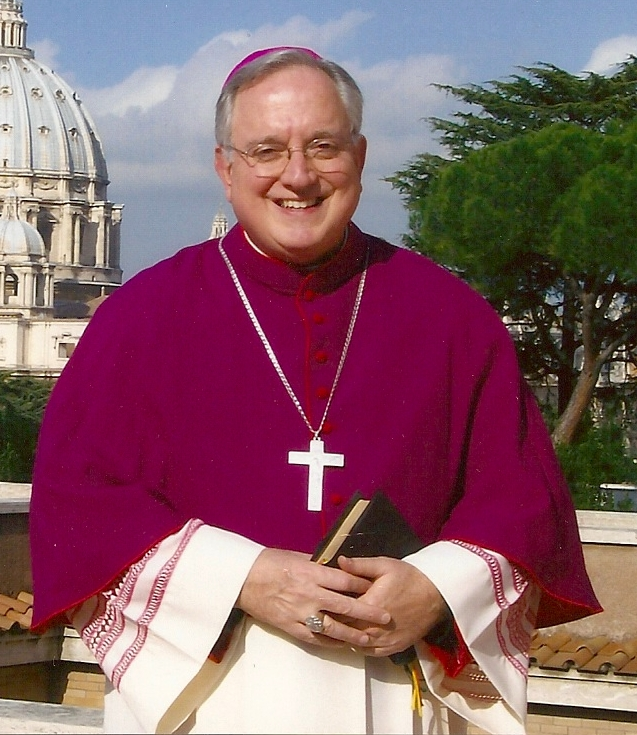
- Church: Roman Catholic
- Diocese: La Crosse
- Appointed: June 11, 2010
- Installed: August 11, 2010
- Retired: March 19, 2024
- Predecessor: Jerome Edward Listecki
- Successor: Gerard William Battersby
- Previous post: Auxiliary Bishop of Milwaukee and Titular Bishop of Lares (2007–2010)

Orders
- Ordination: April 30, 1977 by William Edward Cousins
- Consecration: December 21, 2007 by Timothy M. Dolan, Richard J. Sklba, and John J. Myers

Personal details
- Born: June 17, 1950 (age 76) Chicago, Illinois, US
- Motto: Adoramus te Christe (We adore you Christ)

Styles of William Patrick Callahan
- Reference style: His Excellency; The Most Reverend
- Spoken style: Your Excellency
- Religious style: Bishop

William Patrick Callahan, OFM Conv. (born June 17, 1950) is an American Catholic prelate serving as Bishop of La Crosse from 2010 to May 2024. He is a member of the Conventual Franciscans.

Callahan previously served as an auxiliary bishop for the Archdiocese of Milwaukee. After Archbishop Timothy Dolan was named Archbishop of New York, Callahan was elected the apostolic administrator of the Archdiocese of Milwaukee, serving until November 14, 2009.

== Biography ==
=== Early life and education ===
Callahan was born in Chicago, Illinois, to William and Ellen Callahan. The youngest of four children, he has two sisters, Roberta and JoAnn, and one brother, Jerry. William Callahan attended St. Mary of Perpetual Help Church in Chicago as a child.

Deciding that he wanted to become a priest, Callahan applied to the Archbishop Quigley Preparatory Seminary in Chicago, but was rejected. He instead entered the Franciscan-run St. Mary Minor Seminary in Crystal Lake, Illinois in 1964. He attended a junior college in Chicago in 1968 for one year.

In 1969, Callahan was accepted at the novitiate of the Conventual Franciscans (Minorites) in Lake Forest, Illinois. He made his profession to the Minorites on August 11, 1970. Callahan then attended Loyola University Chicago, obtaining a bachelor's degree in radio and television communications in 1973. He then moved to Toronto, Ontario, to study at St. Michael's College at the University of Toronto, where he received a Master of Divinity degree in 1976.

=== Ordination and ministry ===
Callahan was ordained to the priesthood in Milwaukee at the Basilica of St. Josaphat for the Minorites by Archbishop William Cousins on April 30, 1977. After his 1977 ordination, the Minorites assigned Callahan as curate at St. Josaphat.

He returned to Illinois in 1978 to serve as director of vocations for the Minorites for the next six years. He was named associate pastor in 1984 of Holy Family Parish in Peoria, Illinois; he was appointed pastor of that parish in 1987.

The Minorites transferred Callahan back to Milwaukee in 1994 to become rector and pastor of St. Josaphat. He oversaw the basilica's $7.5 million restoration, earning himself a reputation as an able fundraiser. In 2005, Callahan went to Rome to serve as spiritual director of the Pontifical North American College in Rome.

Ordination history of William P. Callahan
History
Episcopal consecration
- Consecrated by: Timothy Michael Dolan (Milwaukee)

=== Auxiliary Bishop of Milwaukee ===
Coat of arms as Auxiliary Bishop of Milwaukee

On October 30, 2007, Callahan was appointed as an auxiliary bishop of Milwaukee and titular bishop of Lares by Pope Benedict XVI. Callahan received his episcopal consecration on December 21, 2007, from Archbishop Timothy M. Dolan. His co-consecrators were Bishop Richard J. Sklba and Archbishop John Myers.

Callahan is the first Minorite to be appointed as a bishop in the United States, and was the first auxiliary bishop to be named to the Archdiocese of Milwaukee since 1979. Following Dolan's appointment as archbishop of the Archdiocese of New York in February 2009, Callahan was elected as the diocesan administrator of Milwaukee on April 20, 2009. He oversaw the daily administration of the archdiocese until Benedict XVI named Bishop Jerome Listecki as the new archbishop in November 2009.

=== Bishop of La Crosse ===
On June 11, 2010, Callahan was appointed bishop of La Crosse by Benedict XVI, succeeding Listecki. On August 11, 2010, Callahan was installed as bishop.

In August 2020, before the 2020 United States presidential election, James Altman, pastor of St. James the Less Parish in LaCrosse, stated in a YouTube video that “You cannot be Catholic and be a Democrat”, due to the party's support of legal access to abortion. He encouraged Catholic Democrats to “repent of your support of that party and its platform or face the fires of hell.” In July 2021, Callahan removed Altman as pastor of St. James and banned him from public preaching. The next day, in defiance of Callahan's order, Altman gave the benediction at the 2021 Conservative Political Action Conference (CPAC) in Orlando, Florida. In November 2022, Callahan appointed the parochial administrator of St. James as its pastor.

Pope Francis accepted Callahan's resignation from office on March 19, 2024, for health reasons.

== See also ==
- Catholic Church hierarchy
- Catholic Church in the United States
- Historical list of the Catholic bishops of the United States
- List of Catholic bishops of the United States
- Lists of patriarchs, archbishops, and bishops

Catholic Church titles
Preceded by Jerome Edward Listecki	Bishop of La Crosse; 2010–2024	Succeeded by Gerard William Battersby
Preceded by –	Auxiliary Bishop of Milwaukee; 2007–2010	Succeeded by –
