= Paul Francis Tanner =

American prelate

His Excellency, The Most Reverend Paul Francis Tanner
- Bishop of St. Augustine; Titular Bishop of Lamasba
- See: Diocese of St. Augustine
- In office: 1968–1979
- Predecessor: Joseph Patrick Hurley
- Successor: John J. Snyder
- Previous post: Director of the National Catholic Welfare Conference (1958 to 1968)

Orders
- Ordination: May 30, 1931 by Samuel Stritch
- Consecration: December 21, 1966 by Egidio Vagnozzi

Personal details
- Born: January 15, 1905 Peoria, Illinois, US
- Died: July 29, 1994 (aged 89) All Saints Nursing Home in Jacksonville, Florida, US
- Buried: St. Mary Parish Cemetery in Hales Corners, Wisconsin, US
- Denomination: Roman Catholic
- Parents: Frank J. and Laura Margaret (née McGowan) Tanner
- Education: Marquette University; Catholic University of America; Kenrick Seminary; St. Francis Seminary
- Motto: Doing the truth in love

Paul Francis Tanner (January 15, 1905 – July 29, 1994) was an American prelate of the Roman Catholic Church who served as the seventh bishop of the Diocese of St. Augustine in Florida from 1968 to 1979.

== Early life ==
Paul Tanner was born on January 15, 1905, in Peoria, Illinois, to Frank J. and Laura Margaret (née McGowan) Tanner. He and his family later moved to Milwaukee, Wisconsin, where he attended Marquette University. He began his studies for the priesthood at Kenrick Seminary in St. Louis, Missouri, and continued at St. Francis Seminary in Milwaukee.

== Career ==
=== Priesthood ===
Tanner was ordained into the priesthood in Milwaukee by Cardinal Samuel Stritch for the Archdiocese of Milwaukee on May 30, 1931. He then went to Washington D.C. to study theology at the Catholic University of America, earning a Bachelor of Sacred Theology degree in 1933.Returning to Milwaukee, the archdiocese assigned Tanner as a chaplain and professor of religion at St. Mary's Provincial Motherhouse and as a curate at Immaculate Conception Parish in Milwaukee. From 1936 to 1941, he was the archbishop's secretary for Catholic Action and Catechetics.

In 1941, Tanner returned to Washington to work at the National Catholic Welfare Conference (NCWC), serving as an assistant director of the Youth Department. He became director of that department in 1942 . Tanner was appointed assistant general secretary of the NCWC in 1945. The Vatican raised Tanner to the ranks of papal chamberlain in 1948 and domestic prelate in 1954.In 1958, Tanner became NCWC director, staying in that position until 1968. In this position, he executed and coordinated the policies set by the body of the nation's Catholic bishops.

=== Titular Bishop of Lamasba ===
On October 18, 1965, Tanner was appointed Titular Bishop of Lamasba by Pope Paul VI. He was consecrated at the National Shrine of the Immaculate Conception in Washington, D.C. on December 21, 1965, by Archbishop Egidio Vagnozzi, with Archbishops William Cousins and Patrick O'Boyle serving as co-consecrators. He was the first priest to become a bishop while holding the office of general secretary.

=== Bishop of St. Augustine ===
On February 15, 1968, Paul VI named Tanner as the seventh bishop of Augustine. His installation took place at the Cathedral of St. Augustine on March 27, 1968, a ceremony attended by Archbishops Luigi Raimondi and Coleman Carroll, representatives of the Protestant and Jewish communities, and Florida Governor Claude R. Kirk, Jr. Following the unexpected death of Pope John Paul I, Tanner reacted with "shock and surprise, even horror...It's a reminder that we are just one heartbeat away from eternity."

== Retirement and death ==
Tanner's resignation as bishop of St. Augustine was accepted by Pope John Paul II on April 21, 1979. Paul Tanner died at All Saints Nursing Home in Jacksonville, Florida, at age 89. He is buried at St. Mary Parish Cemetery in Hales Corners, Wisconsin.

Catholic Church titles
Preceded by Joseph Patrick Hurley	Bishop of St. Augustine; 1968—1979	Succeeded by John J. Snyder
