= Timothy Dolan =

American Catholic cardinal (born 1950)

His Eminence Timothy Dolan
- Cardinal; Archbishop Emeritus of New York
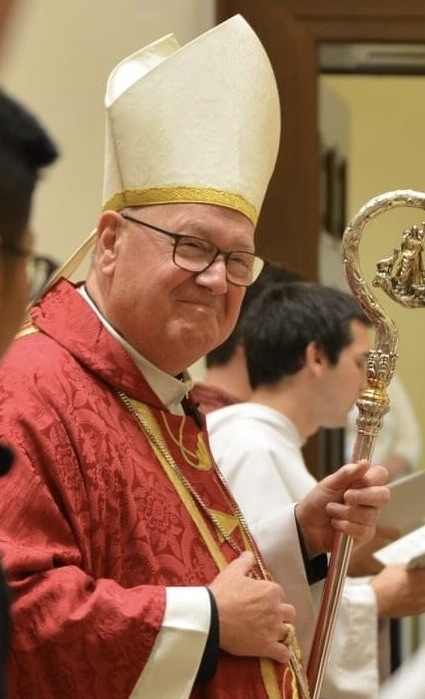
- Dolan in 2019, during the entrance procession of Mass at the University of St. Thomas
- Church: Latin Church
- Archdiocese: New York
- Appointed: February 23, 2009
- Installed: April 15, 2009
- Retired: December 18, 2025
- Predecessor: Edward Egan
- Successor: Ronald Hicks
- Other post: Cardinal Priest of Nostra Signora di Guadalupe a Monte Mario
- Previous post: Rector, Pontifical North American College (1994‍–‍2001); Auxiliary Bishop of St. Louis & Titular Bishop of Natchesium (2001‍–‍2002); Archbishop of Milwaukee (2002‍–‍2009); Apostolic administrator of Green Bay (2007‍–‍2008); President, United States Conference of Catholic Bishops (2010‍–‍2013)

Orders
- Ordination: June 19, 1976 by Edward O'Meara
- Consecration: August 15, 2001 by Justin Rigali
- Created cardinal: February 18, 2012 by Pope Benedict XVI
- Rank: Cardinal priest

Personal details
- Born: Timothy Michael Dolan; February 6, 1950 (age 76) St. Louis, Missouri, US
- Education: Cardinal Glennon College (BA); Pontifical University of St. Thomas Aquinas (STL); Catholic University of America
- Motto: Ad quem ibimus (Latin for 'To whom shall we go?') (John 6:68)
- Styles
- Reference style: His Eminence
- Spoken style: Your Eminence
- Religious style: Cardinal
- Informal style: Cardinal

Ordination history
History
Priestly ordination
- Ordained by: Edward O'Meara
- Date: June 19, 1976
Episcopal consecration
- Principal consecrator: Justin Rigali
- Co-consecrators: Joseph Fred Naumann; Michael John Sheridan
- Date: August 15, 2001
- Place: Cathedral Basilica of Saint Louis, St. Louis, Missouri, US
Cardinalate
- Elevated by: Pope Benedict XVI
- Date: February 18, 2012
Episcopal succession
Bishops consecrated by Timothy Dolan as principal consecrator
- William P. Callahan: December 21, 2007
- Terry R. LaValley: April 30, 2010
- Edward Bernard Scharfenberger: April 10, 2014
- John Joseph Jenik: August 4, 2014
- John Joseph O'Hara: August 4, 2014
- Peter John Byrne: August 4, 2014
- Douglas Lucia: August 8, 2019
- Edmund James Whalen: December 10, 2019
- Gerardo Joseph Colacicco: December 10, 2019
- John S. Bonnici: March 1, 2022
- Joseph A. Espaillat: March 1, 2022

Timothy Michael Dolan (born February 6, 1950) is an American Catholic prelate who served as Archbishop of New York from 2009 to 2025. Dolan served as president of the United States Conference of Catholic Bishops (USCCB) from 2010 to 2013. Dolan was rector of the Pontifical North American College in Rome from 1994 to 2001, auxiliary bishop of the Archdiocese of St. Louis from 2001 to 2002, and archbishop of the Archdiocese of Milwaukee from 2002 to 2009. Dolan was made a cardinal by Pope Benedict XVI in 2012.

On February 10, 2026, Dolan was appointed co-chief chaplain of the New York City Police Department (NYPD).

== Early life and education ==
The eldest of five children, Dolan was born on February 6, 1950, in St. Louis, Missouri, to Robert (1925–1977) and Shirley (née Radcliffe) Dolan (1928–2022). His father was an aircraft engineer, working as a floor supervisor at McDonnell Douglas. Dolan has two brothers, one of whom, Bob Dolan, is a former radio talk-show host, and two sisters. The family later moved to Ballwin, Missouri, where they attended Holy Infant Parish.

Dolan exhibited a strong interest in the priesthood from an early age, once saying, "I can never remember a time I didn't want to be a priest." He would also pretend to celebrate Mass as a child. Dolan entered Saint Louis Preparatory Seminary in Shrewsbury, Missouri, in 1964. He later obtained a Bachelor of Arts in philosophy degree from Cardinal Glennon College in Shrewsbury. Cardinal John Carberry then sent Dolan to reside at the Pontifical North American College in Rome while studying there. Dolan earned a Licentiate of Sacred Theology in 1976 from the Pontifical University of St. Thomas Aquinas in Rome.

== Early career ==
=== Priesthood ===
Dolan was ordained a priest at Holy Infant Church on June 19, 1976, for the Archdiocese of St. Louis by Auxiliary Bishop Edward O'Meara. After his 1976 ordination, the archdiocese assigned Dolan as an associate pastor at Curé of Ars Parish in Shrewsbury and Immacolata Parish in Richmond Heights. In 1979, the archdiocese sent Dolan to Washington D.C. to begin his doctoral studies at the Catholic University of America under Reverend John Ellis, concentrating on the Catholic history of the United States. Dolan's doctoral thesis centered on Bishop Edwin O'Hara of Kansas City; it was eventually published as a book.

Upon Dolan's return to Missouri in 1983, the archdiocese assigned him to pastoral work in parishes for the next four years. During this time, he collaborated with Archbishop John L. May in reforming the archdiocesan seminary. In 1987, the Vatican appointed Dolan as secretary of the Apostolic Nunciature in Washington, serving as a liaison with the American dioceses. Dolan left Washington in 1992 after Archbishop John May named him as vice-rector of Kenrick-Glennon Seminary. He also served as spiritual director at the seminary and taught Catholic history. Dolan was also posted as an adjunct professor of theology at St. Louis University in St. Louis.

=== Rector of Pontifical North American College ===
Dolan returned to Rome in 1994 after the USCCB appointed him as rector of the Pontifical North American College. During his tenure in Rome, he published Priests for the Third Millennium, and taught at the Pontifical Gregorian University and St. Thomas Aquinas. He was granted the title of monsignor by Pope John Paul II in 1994.

=== Auxiliary Bishop of St. Louis ===
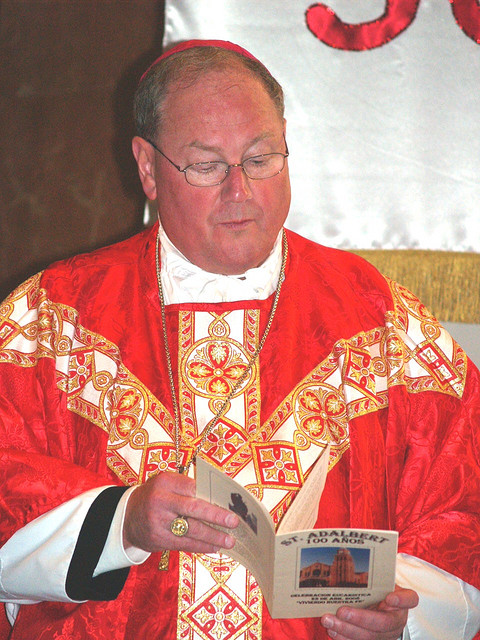
Cardinal Dolan in his liturgical vestments (2009)

On June 19, 2001, Pope St. John Paul II appointed Dolan as an auxiliary bishop of St. Louis and titular bishop of Natchesium. He received his episcopal consecration on August 15, 2001, from Archbishop Justin Rigali, with Bishops Joseph Naumann and Michael Sheridan serving as co-consecrators. Dolan chose as his episcopal motto: Ad quem ibimus, meaning, "Lord, to whom shall we go?" (John 6:68).

=== Archbishop of Milwaukee ===
On June 25, 2002, Pope St. John Paul II appointed Dolan as the tenth archbishop of Milwaukee. He was installed at the Cathedral of St. John the Evangelist in Milwaukee on August 28, 2002. Dolan said he was challenged and haunted by the sexual abuse scandal in Milwaukee, which broke during his tenure. According to radio station WTAQ news, "An attorney says at least 8,000 kids were sexually abused by over 100 priests and other offenders in the Milwaukee Catholic Diocese."

Dolan took a special interest in priests and vocations, and the number of seminary enrollments rose during his tenure as archbishop. In an outdoor Mass in September 2002, Dolan briefly wore a "cheesehead" hat during his homily in tribute to the Green Bay Packers football team. While in Milwaukee, he wrote Called to Be Holy (2005) and To Whom Shall We Go? Lessons from the Apostle Peter (2008), and co-hosted a television program with his brother called Living Our Faith.

==== Apostolic administrator of Green Bay ====
On September 28, 2007, Pope Benedict XVI named Dolan as the apostolic administrator of the Diocese of Green Bay. Continuing to serve as archbishop in Milwaukee, Dolan's term as administrator ended on July 9, 2008, when Benedict XVI appointed Bishop David L. Ricken as the next bishop of Green Bay.

== Archbishop of New York ==
=== Appointment as archbishop and installation ===
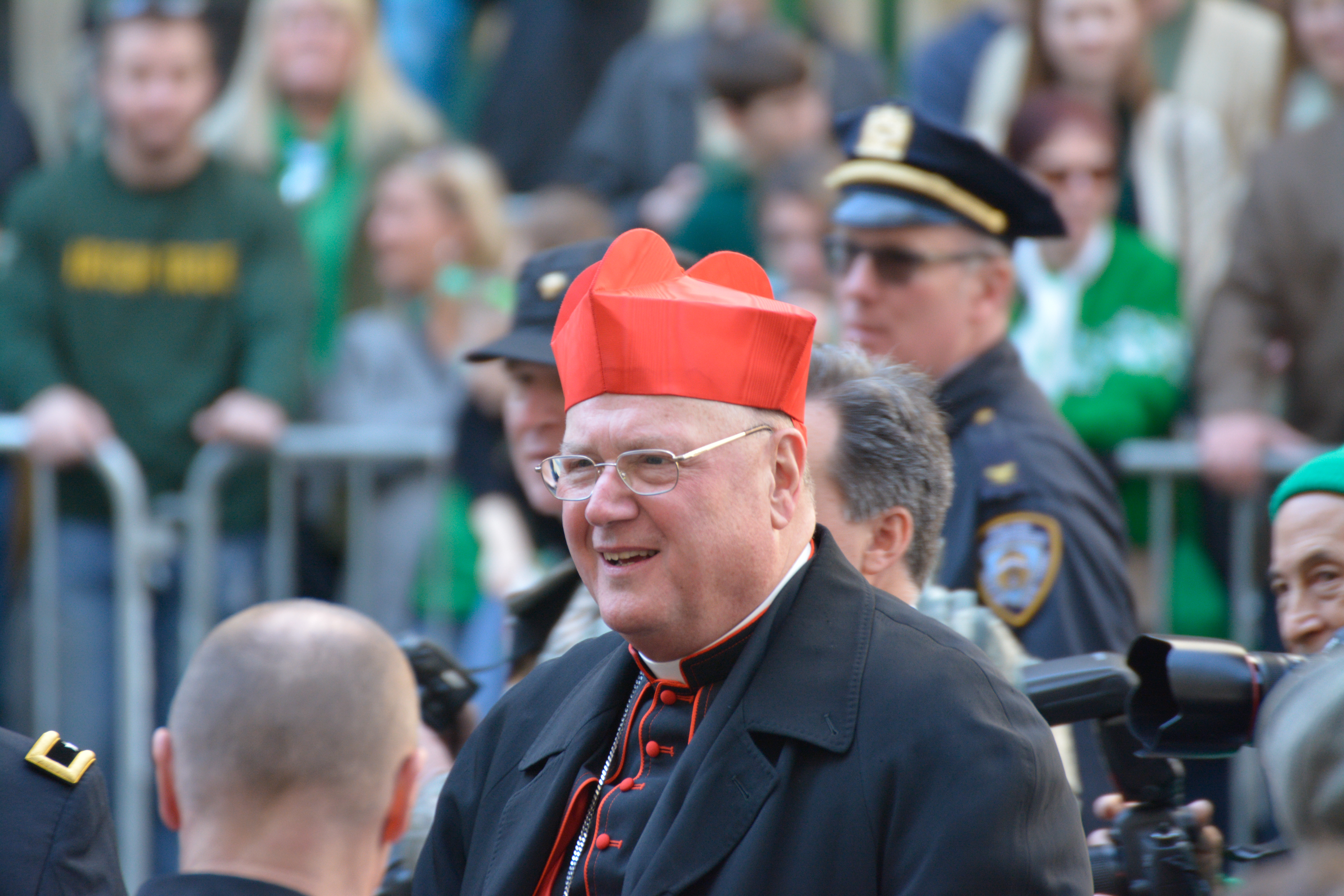
Cardinal Dolan at the 2016 Saint Patrick's Day Parade in New York City

On February 23, 2009, Dolan was appointed the tenth archbishop of New York by Benedict XVI. According to Dolan, Apostolic Nuncio Pietro Sambi notified him by phone of his appointment in New York "nine, ten days" prior to the official announcement. Dolan said that when he was appointed auxiliary bishop of St. Louis and archbishop of Milwaukee, he was told on the phone that John Paul II "would like [him] to" take the posts. In contrast, Sambi told Dolan that "the Pope [Benedict XVI] had appointed [him]" to New York, giving Dolan little choice other than to accept it.

Before Dolan's appointment as archbishop of New York, observers had repeatedly mentioned him as a possible successor to Cardinal Edward Egan. Dolan had downplayed such speculation, saying, "Anytime there's kind of a major see that opens, what have we seen with Washington, Baltimore, Detroit, now New York, my name for some reason comes up. I'm flattered." John L. Allen Jr., Vatican correspondent for the National Catholic Reporter, noted that Benedict XVI's appointment of Dolan followed his pattern of choosing prelates "who are basically conservative in both their politics and their theology, but also upbeat, pastoral figures given to dialogue".

In an interview with the Associated Press before his installation, Dolan pledged to challenge claims that the Catholic Church was unenlightened due to its opposition to same-sex marriage and abortion. Dolan said that he hoped to rebuild confidence among Catholics who were disenchanted with the church after the sexual abuse scandals; he described these scandals as "a continuing source of shame".

Dolan was installed as archbishop of New York at St. Patrick's Cathedral on April 15, 2009. He wore the pectoral cross used by his 19th-century predecessor, Archbishop John Hughes. Eleven cardinals and several New York elected officials attended the ceremony. Dolan received the pallium, a vestment worn by metropolitan bishops, from Benedict XVI on June 29, 2009, in a ceremony at St. Peter's Basilica.

Dolan is the Grand Prior of the USA Eastern Lieutenancy of the Equestrian Order of the Holy Sepulchre of Jerusalem.

=== Closing of schools and parishes ===
Soon after his arrival in New York, Dolan oversaw two "strategic planning" processes on the utilization of archdiocesan schools and parishes. "Pathways to Excellence," held from 2009 to 2013, examined the elementary schools. "Making All Things New," from 2010 to 2015, examined the parishes. Like in many other American dioceses, Dolan closed dozens of schools and parishes would close or merge with others in their neighborhoods, due to decades-long trends of shifting populations, increasing expenses, declining attendance, and decreasing clergy.

Dolan served as chair of the board of directors of Catholic Relief Services, in which capacity he visited Ethiopia and India, until his election as USCCB president. He remains a member of the Board of Trustees of The Catholic University of America.

=== Apostolic visitations ===
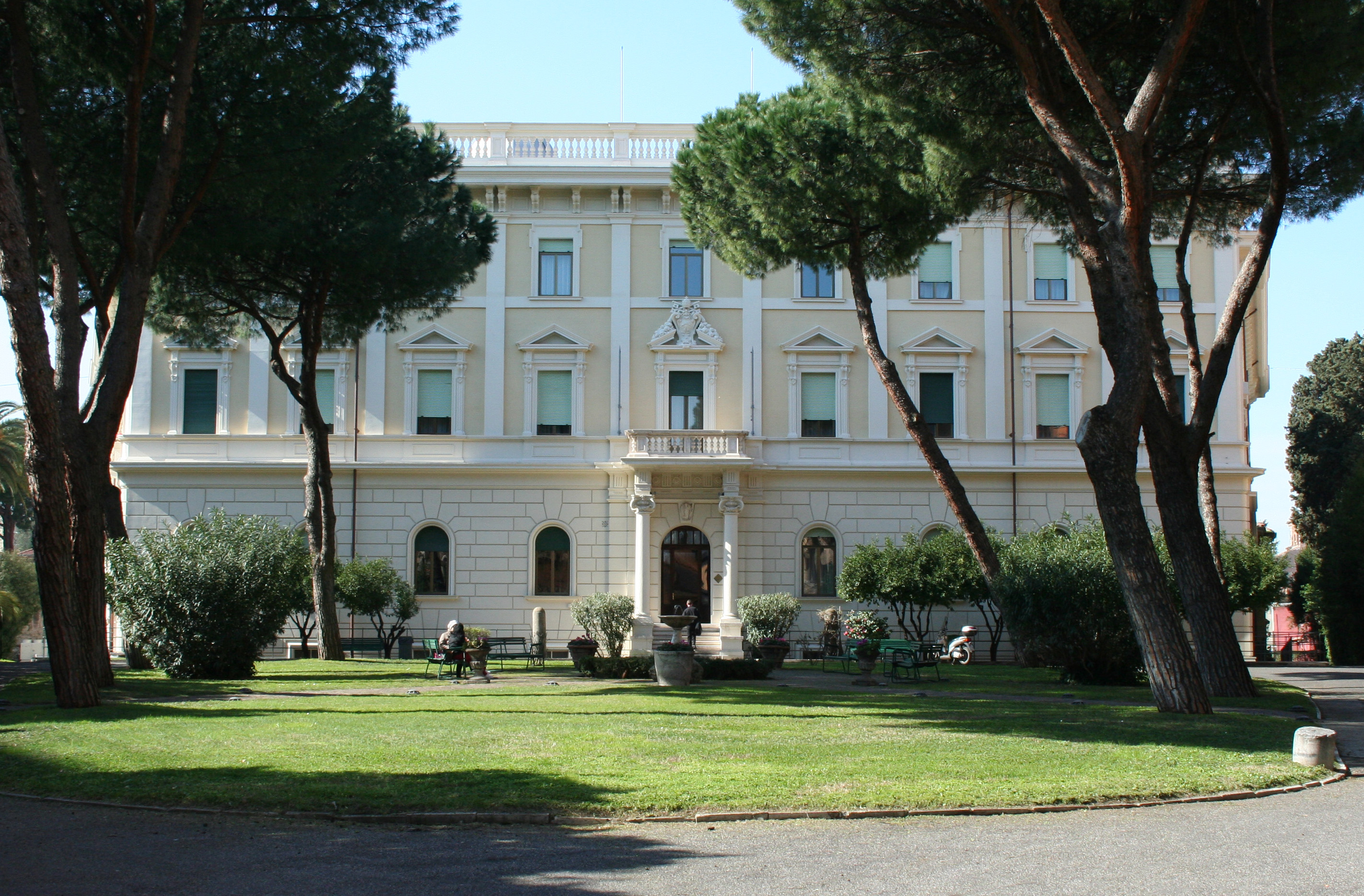
Pontifical Irish College, Rome, Italy (2009)

Dolan was the apostolic visitor to Irish seminaries as part of the Apostolic visitation to Ireland following the 2009 publication of the Ryan and Murphy Reports on sexual abuse. Dolan was part of a team that included Cardinal Cormac Murphy-O'Connor, archbishop emeritus of Westminster; Cardinal Seán Patrick O'Malley of Boston; Toronto's Archbishop Thomas Christopher Collins; and Ottawa's Archbishop Terrence Prendergast. They reported their findings to Pope Benedict XVI in 2012.

On January 5, 2011, Dolan was appointed to the newly created Pontifical Council for Promoting the New Evangelization. Also in 2011, at the Vatican's request, Dolan led a visitation (investigation) of the Pontifical Irish College, the seminary for Irish seminarians and priests studying in Rome. His 2012 report was highly critical of the college. It said that "a disturbingly significant number of seminarians gave a negative assessment of the atmosphere of the house". The report said that the staff were "critical about any emphasis on Rome, tradition, the magisterium, piety or assertive orthodoxy, while the students are enthusiastic about these features". It also said: "The apostolic visitor noted, and heard from students, an 'anti-ecclesial bias' in theological formation.

Dolan's report recommended that the college make staff changes. As a result, the college reassigned three staff members back to Ireland and a fourth one resigned. The four Irish archbishops (Cardinal Seán Brady, Archbishop Diarmuid Martin; Archbishop Michael Neary; and Archbishop Dermot Clifford) responded to the report, saying that "a deep prejudice appears to have coloured the visitation and from the outset it led to the hostile tone and content of the report".

=== Other actions ===
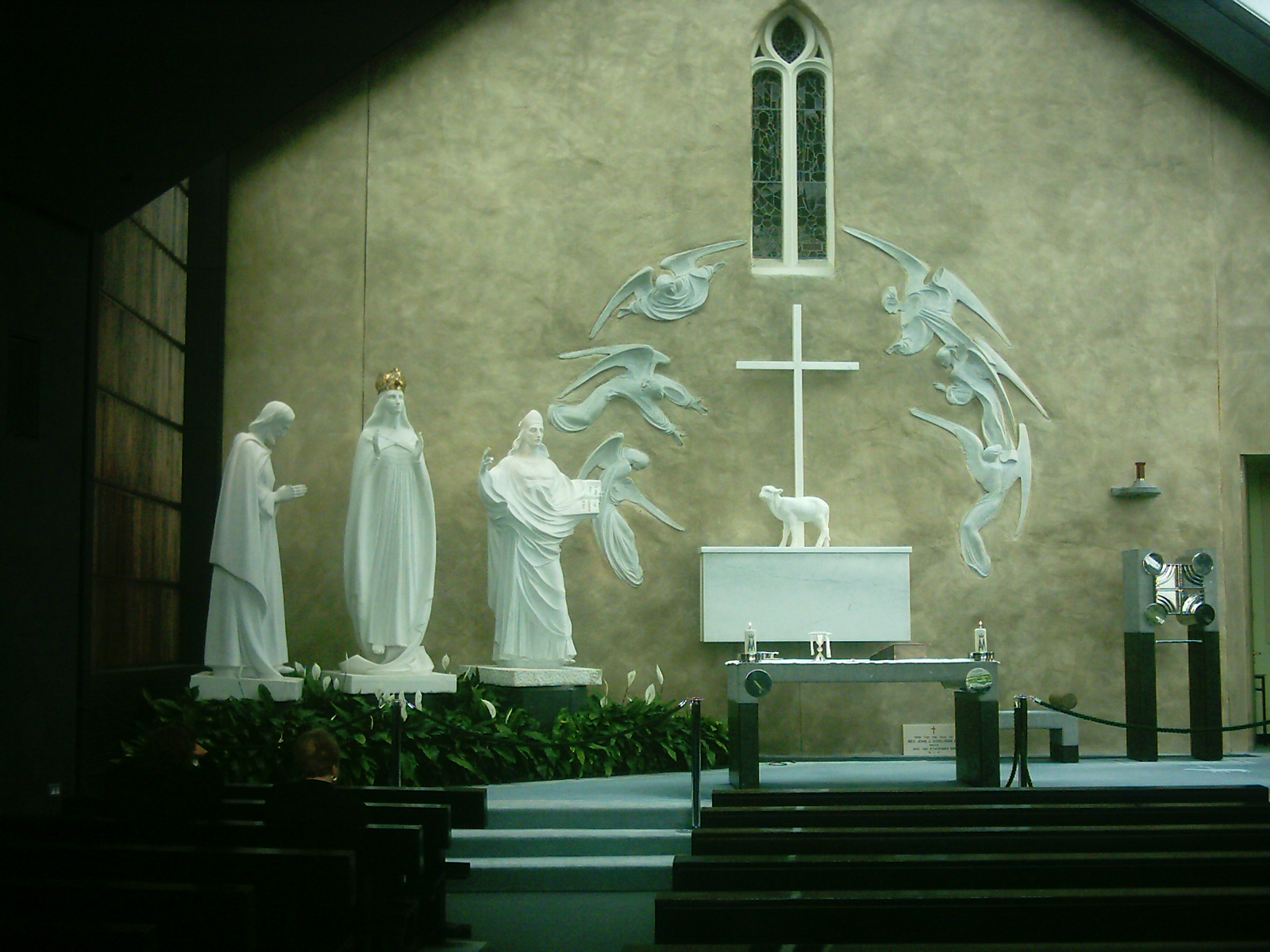
Sanctuary of Our Lady of Knock, Knock, Ireland (2005)

On December 29, 2011, Dolan was appointed a member of the Pontifical Council for Social Communications for a five-year renewable term. On April 21, 2011, he was appointed a member of the Congregation for the Oriental Churches. On January 24, 2012, Dolan went on a religious pilgrimage to Israel and the West Bank, where he met the Latin Patriarch of Jerusalem, Fouad Twal. On November 30, 2013, Pope Francis named Dolan a member of the Congregation for Catholic Education.

On September 3, 2014, Dolan denied requests by the Diocese of Peoria to receive the remains of Archbishop Fulton Sheen, who had been entombed in St. Patrick's Cathedral since his death in 1979. The diocese sued the archdiocese, claiming that it owned the rights to remains. On November 17, 2016, Judge Arlene Bluth of the New York State Supreme Court ordered the archdiocese to transfer the remains to Peoria. On September 13, 2014, Dolan was appointed a member of the Congregation for the Evangelization of Peoples.

Dolan completed a pilgrimage to the Sanctuary of Our Lady of Knock in Knock Ireland, in 2015. On May 13, 2017, he celebrated a requiem Mass when John Curry, the youngest witness to the Knock apparition, was re-interred in St. Patrick's Old Cathedral cemetery in Lower Manhattan after being disinterred from an unmarked grave on Long Island. At the inauguration of US President Donald Trump on January 20, 2017, Dolan delivered the first benediction. His invocation included a recitation of King Solomon's prayer from the Book of Wisdom.

In August 2020 he offered the opening prayer at session of the 2020 Republican National Convention. In February 2023, Dolan announced that the archdiocese was closing 12 schools that had not recovered financially from the COVID-19 pandemic. On April 13, 2024, during a visit to Jerusalem, Dolan and his entourage were forced to take cover due to an Iranian missile attack on the city. The attack was a response to an April 1 Israeli airstrike on the Iranian consulate in Damascus, Syria. No one in Dolan's group was injured. Dolan on October 1, 2024, announced that the archdiocese was suing its insurers, Chubb Group, for its alleged failure to pay insurance claims related to the sexual abuse scandal.

=== USCCB ===
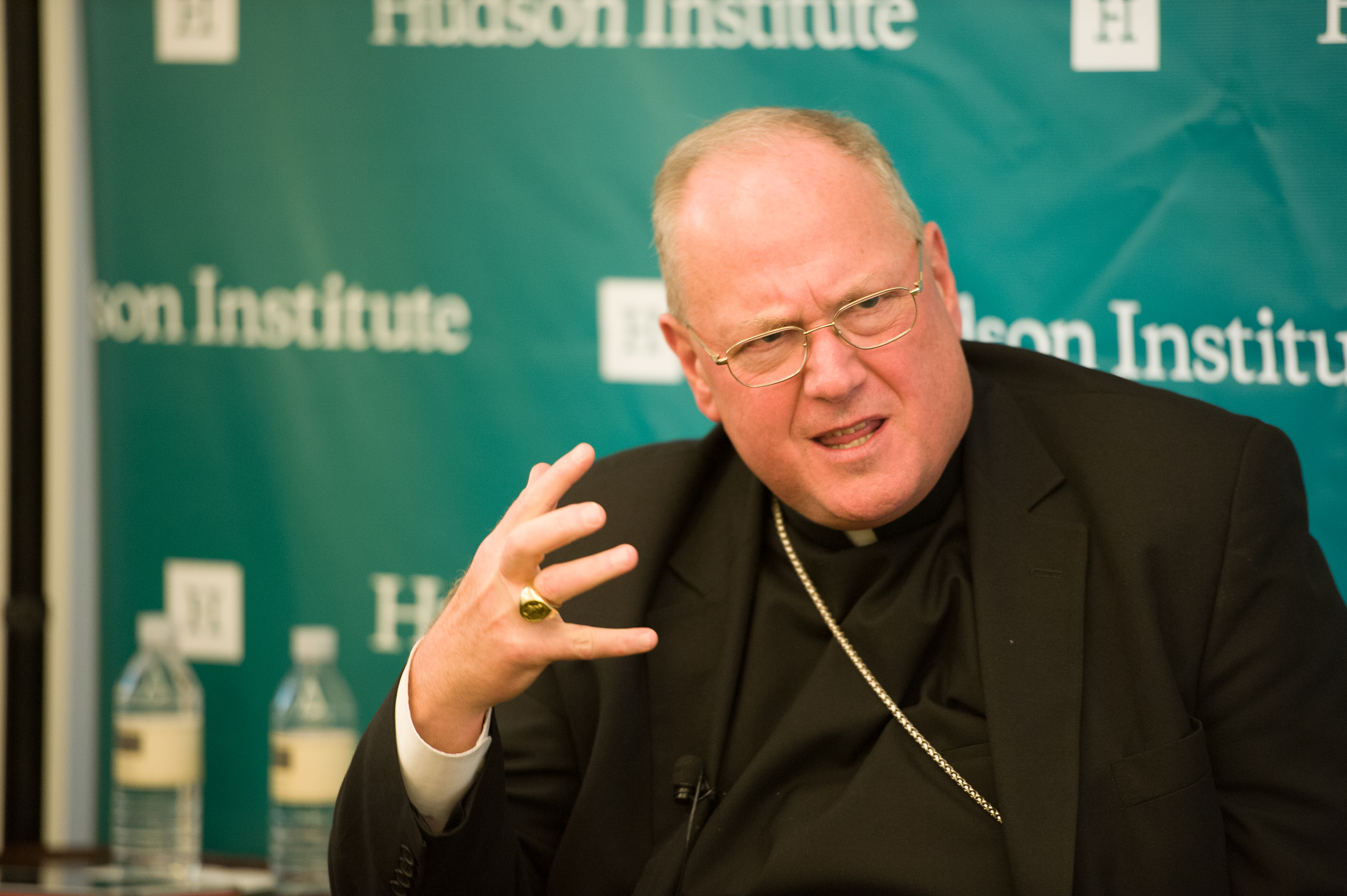
Dolan speaking at a conference (2015)

Within the USCCB, Dolan chairs the Priestly Life and Ministry Committee and sits on the Subcommittee on the Church in Africa. In November 2007, he lost the election for USCCB vice president, being defeated by Bishop Gerald Kicanas by a margin of 22 votes. Dolan was elected on November 16, 2010, to the USCCB presidency, becoming the first New York prelate to hold this post. Dolan replaced Cardinal Francis George, who did not run for re-election. In a vote of 128 to 111, Dolan defeated Kicanas and eight other candidates to win the three-year term. Dolan took office two days later and served as president until November 12, 2013.

== Cardinal ==
Dolan was elevated to the rank of cardinal by Benedict XVI on February 18, 2012. The day before the consistory, Dolan addressed the pope and the College of Cardinals on spreading the faith in a secularized world. He was created Cardinal Priest of the Nostra Signora di Guadalupe a Monte Mario church in Rome. Dolan was the first archbishop of New York since 1946 not to receive the titular church of Santi Giovanni e Paolo, as that title was still being held by his predecessor, Cardinal Egan. After Benedict XVI announced his retirement as pope due to ill health, effective February 28, 2013, the press suggested Dolan as a papabile, a possible successor to Benedict.

In February 2025, Dolan submitted his resignation to Pope Francis, as is required for every bishop on his 75th birthday. Pope Francis died before accepting his resignation.

In May 2025, Dolan participated in the papal conclave convened after the death of Pope Francis. According to multiple Italian news outlets, Dolan played a significant behind-the-scenes role, acting as a consensus-builder among American and Latin American cardinals. According to several reports, Cardinal Dolan acted as a kingmaker in the 2025 papal conclave, gathering strong support for Cardinal Robert Prevost, who was eventually elected pope as Leo XIV. Analysts noted that Dolan used his influence to steer votes away from front-runner Cardinal Pietro Parolin, rallying support for Prevost during pre-conclave discussions.

Pope Leo XIV accepted Dolan's resignation on December 18, 2025, and appointed Ronald Hicks as his successor. Dolan called Hicks' appointment "an early Christmas gift" and spoke highly of his successor at a joint press conference. Dolan acted as the apostolic administrator of the Archdiocese of New York from that date until February 6, 2026, when Hicks was installed as archbishop of New York.

Leading up to and after the announcement of his resignation being accepted, Dolan stated in multiple interviews that he would remain in New York and "always keep working".

In March 2026, Cardinal Dolan was named co-chief Chaplain of the NYPD along with the Reverend A. R. Bernard.

== Views ==
=== Artificial contraception ===
In February 2012, Dolan criticized the contraceptive mandate enacted by the Obama administration requiring employers offering employee health insurance to provide at least one form of artificial contraception to their female employees. In a televised CBS interview, Dolan charged the federal government with forcing Catholic organizations to provide birth control coverage, even though it contravened Catholic teaching.

In March 2012, after the administration amended the rule to require the insurers, not the employers, to provide the birth control coverage for employees, Dolan said that the "first decision was a terribly misguided judgment" and that the March revision was "a first step".

=== Race and police issues ===
On June 2, 2020, Dolan spoke on his podcast about the protests and police actions following the 2020 murders of George Floyd in Minneapolis and Ahmaud Arbery in Georgia, along with the 2020 shooting of Breonna Taylor in Louisville. In this interview, he attempted to speak to both protesters and police. He argued that police were mostly good people and compared them to priests. He also said that the protesters had an important message. Dolan then said that black lives matter, joining that statement with "all lives matter" and "police lives matter".

In a June 28, 2020, Wall Street Journal opinion piece, Dolan argued against removing statues of American historical figures because they had been slave owners or fought for the Confederacy in the American Civil War. Dolan said, "If we only honor perfect, saintly people of the past, I guess I'm left with only the cross. And some people would ban that."

In a July 1, 2020, opinion piece for the New York Post, Dolan called for ending the perceived demonization of the New York City Police Department. He said that "the most stinging rebuke [of the murder of George Floyd by a policeman in Minneapolis] comes from ... cops I chat with on the sidewalks of New York". He added that "in a recent meeting with community activists, one black leader reminded us, 'Don't give me this 'get-rid-of-the-cops' rant! You on Madison Avenue or Park Avenue might not need the police. We up in The Bronx sure do!'"

=== FBI Richmond memo ===
In February 2023, speaking for the United States Conference of Catholic Bishops, Dolan called on federal authorities to "take appropriate measures to ensure the problematic aspects of the memo do not recur" following the release of an FBI Richmond Field Office memo that cited "radical-traditionalist" Catholic ideology as a potential source of domestic terrorism.

=== Moral issues ===
In November 2009, Dolan signed the Manhattan Declaration, a manifesto circulated by conservative Christian groups in the United States. The declaration called for Christians to commit acts of civil disobedience against laws forcing them to participate in abortion or treat same sex relationships as if they are marriages.

=== LGBTQ ===
In October 2017, Auxiliary Bishop John O'Hara, acting on Dolan's behalf, stopped St. Mary Parish in the Archdiocese of New York from hosting the International Human Rights Art Festival. This was because the festival had scheduled two performances that included gay and transgender content. After the archdiocese complained about it, the festival director moved the event to an Episcopal church in Brooklyn.

In June 2023, Outreach Catholic, an LGBTQ Catholic advocacy group, held a conference at Fordham University. Francis sent his best wishes to the conference attendees. Prior to the event, Dolan sent a letter to Reverend James Martin, the leader of Outreach, stating: "It is the sacred duty of the Church and Her ministers to reach out to those on the periphery and draw them to a closer relationship with Jesus Christ and His Church. Your vital and important ministry is a valuable and necessary contribution to that effort."

=== War and capital punishment ===
In 2009, Dolan defended his silence in 2001 regarding US President George W. Bush's appearance at the University of Notre Dame. Some Catholics had criticized Bush for his support of capital punishment. Many Catholics later condemned him for the 2003 US invasion of Iraq. Dolan said, "Where President Bush would have taken positions on those two hot-button issues that I'd be uncomfortable with, namely the war and capital punishment, I would have to give him the benefit of the doubt to say that those two issues are open to some discussion and are not intrinsically evil. In the Catholic mindset that would not apply to abortion."

=== Sexual abuse scandal ===
In 2002, Archbishop Justin Rigali of St. Louis assigned Dolan to investigate priests accused of sexual misconduct in the archdiocese. Dolan spoke with parishioners, victims, and the media about the scandals, and invited victims to come forward with their allegations. Commenting on his meetings with victims, Dolan said "it is impossible to exaggerate the gravity of the situation, and the suffering that victims feel, because I've spent the last four months being with them, crying with them, having them express their anger to me." Dolan's dismissal of abusive priests from public ministry angered some parishioners, who denounced his investigation as a "witch hunt". In a 2003 letter to Cardinal Joseph Ratzinger, Dolan requested that the Vatican expedite the laicization of priests whom he believed were "remorseless and a serious risk to children". In the letter, Dolan wrote: "As victims organize and become more public, the potential for true scandal is very real."

In 2011, Dolan thanked Bill Donohue, leader of the conservative group Catholic League, for a press release that was reproduced on the Archdiocese of New York website. In the statement, Donohue denounced Survivors Network of those Abused by Priests (SNAP) as a "phony victims' group". SNAP had previously criticized Dolan. In May 2012, The New York Times revealed that the Archdiocese of Milwaukee, then headed by Dolan, had paid some abusive priests up to $20,000 to resign the priesthood immediately rather than wait for the Vatican to laicize them. The archdiocese noted that these priests, all suspended from public ministry, were still receiving full salaries and would continue to do so until their laicization. Furthermore, these payments were motivating them not to contest being defrocked; Dolan had previously termed accusations of giving "payoffs" to accused priests as "false, preposterous and unjust".

In July 2013, documents were made public during bankruptcy proceedings for the Archdiocese of Milwaukee. They showed that Dolan, then archbishop of Milwaukee, in 2007 had sought permission from the Vatican to shield $57 million in church funds from victims' lawsuits. In the letter, Dolan wrote: "By transferring these assets to the trust, I foresee an improved protection of these funds from any legal claim and liability." Dolan had previously denied shielding assets from child sex abuse victims claiming compensation, calling the accusations "old and discredited" and "malarkey." The Vatican approved the 2007 request from Dolan five weeks later.

In September 2018, after the August release of the Pennsylvania grand jury report on sexual abuse in Pennsylvania dioceses and the sexual abuse allegations against then Cardinal Theodore McCarrick, a CNN interviewer asked Dolan whether he believed that homosexuality was a cause of clergy sexual abuse of minors. He answered: "I don't think that's the sole root of it. The sole root of it is a lack of chastity, a lack of virtue. This isn't about right or left. This isn't about gay or straight. This is about right and wrong."

In 2019, The Washington Post reported that Dolan, along with some other American prelates, had received substantial cash gifts from Bishop Michael J. Bransfield, which he took from investments owned by the Diocese of Wheeling-Charleston. Bransfield had resigned following allegations of sexual misconduct and embezzlement, and was later forced by the Vatican to make restitution to his diocese. Dolan never commented on this allegation.

=== Terrorism ===
In April 2009, Dolan visited Ground Zero, the Manhattan site of the September 11, 2001, terrorist attacks on the World Trade Center. Dolan recited the same prayer offered there by Benedict XVI during his 2008 visit to New York, commenting, "We'll never stop crying. But it's also about September 12th and all the renewal and rebuilding and hope and solidarity and compassion that symbolizes this great community and still does."

=== Letter to cardinals ===
In July 2020, the progressive National Catholic Reporter reported that Ignatius Press sent copies of the book The Next Pope: The Office of Peter and a Church in Mission, by conservative author George Weigel, to all 222 cardinals. The publishers included a copy of a letter from Dolan, stating: "I am grateful to Ignatius Press for making this important reflection on the future of the Church available to the College of Cardinals." Some cardinals saw this as a violation of the 1996 apostolic constitution Universi Dominici gregis in which John Paul II "forbid(s) anyone, even if he is a Cardinal, during the Pope's lifetime and without having consulted him, to make plans concerning the election of his successor." Dolan had earlier been critical of the way Francis had organized the 2015 Synod on the Family. Replying to criticism about his book, Weigel stated that it "does not contain a single sentence about a future conclave. No potential candidates are named and no conclave strategy is discussed. The book is a reflection on the future of the Office of Peter in what Pope Francis has called a Church 'permanently in mission'. Period."

=== Charlie Kirk ===
Following the assassination of conservative activist Charlie Kirk, Dolan praised Kirk as a "modern-day St. Paul". The Sisters of Charity of New York rejected the comparison, writing that "many of Mr. Kirk's words were marked by racist, homophobic, transphobic, and anti-immigrant rhetoric, by violent pro-gun advocacy, and by the promotion of Christian nationalism." The National Catholic Reporter further criticized Dolan's comments, given that Kirk had described Pope Francis as a heretical Marxist.

== Public lecture ==
In 2004, Dolan delivered the eighteenth Erasmus Lecture, titled The Bishops in Council, organized by First Things magazine and the Institute on Religion and Public Life. In his address, Dolan reflected on the history and role of episcopal collegiality in the Catholic Church, emphasizing the theological and pastoral importance of bishops working together in service to unity and mission. The lecture examined both the historical roots of church councils and their continuing significance for contemporary Catholic leadership.

== Distinctions ==
- Officer's Cross of the Order of Merit of the Republic of Poland, awarded on September 17, 2012, by president of Poland Bronisław Komorowski.
- Knight Grand Cross of the Order of Saints Maurice and Lazarus, awarded on December 11, 2011, by Victor Emmanuel, Prince of Naples.
- Knight Grand Cross of Justice of the Sacred Military Constantinian Order of Saint George
- Bailiff Grand Cross of Honour and Devotion of the Order of Malta
- Isaiah Award for Exemplary Interreligious Leadership, presented on November 2, 2015, by the American Jewish Committee (AJC). It cited Dolan for "his steadfast contribution and ongoing commitment to the relationship between our respective faiths".

== Published books ==
- Dolan, Fr. Timothy M. (1992). Some Seed Fell on Good Ground – The Life of Edwin V. O'Hara. Washington, D.C.: Catholic University of America Press. ISBN 978-0-8132-0748-3.
- Dolan, Fr. Timothy M. (circa 1993). A Century of Papal Representation in the United States. South Orange, New Jersey: Immaculate Conception Seminary School of Theology of Seton Hall University. OCLC 3822-1938.
- Dolan, Monsignor Timothy M. (2000). Priests For The Third Millennium. Huntington, Indiana: Our Sunday Visitor. ISBN 978-0-87973-319-3. (A collection of talks given to the seminarians and priests at the Pontifical North American College, a school in Rome, Italy, for Roman Catholic seminarians and priests.)
- Dolan, Archbishop Timothy M.; Roman Catholic Archdiocese of St. Louis (2001). Archdiocese of St. Louis – Three Centuries of Catholicism, 1700–2000. Strasbourg, France: Éditions du Signe. ISBN 978-2-7468-0353-4.
- Dolan, Archbishop Timothy M. (2005). Called to Be Holy. Huntington, Indiana: Our Sunday Visitor. ISBN 978-1-59276-072-5.
- Dolan, Archbishop Timothy M. (2007). Advent Reflections – Come, Lord Jesus!. Huntington, Indiana: Our Sunday Visitor. ISBN 978-1-59276-393-1.
- Dolan, Archbishop Timothy M. (2009). Doers of the Word – Putting Your Faith into Practice. Huntington, Indiana: Our Sunday Visitor. ISBN 978-1-59276-639-0.
- Dolan, Archbishop Timothy M. (2009). To Whom Shall We Go? – Lessons from the Apostle Peter. Huntington, Indiana: Our Sunday Visitor. ISBN 978-1-59276-050-3.

== See also ==
- Catholic Church in the United States
- Hierarchy of the Catholic Church
- Historical list of the Catholic bishops of the United States
- List of Catholic bishops in the United States
- Lists of popes, patriarchs, primates, archbishops, and bishops

Academic offices
Preceded by Edwin Frederick O'Brien	Rector of the Pontifical North American College; 1994–2001	Succeeded by Kevin McCoy
Catholic Church titles
Preceded by Adolfo Suárez Rivera	Cardinal-Priest of Nostra Signora di Guadalupe a Monte Mario; 2012–present	Incumbent
Preceded by Francis George	President of the United States Conference of Catholic Bishops; 2010–2013	Succeeded by Joseph Edward Kurtz
Preceded by Edward Egan	Archbishop of New York; 2009–2025	Succeeded by Ronald Aldon Hicks
Preceded by Rembert Weakland	Archbishop of Milwaukee; 2002–2009	Succeeded by Jerome E. Listecki
Preceded by John Gavin Nolan	— TITULAR — Bishop of Natchesium; 2001–2002	Succeeded by Salvatore Cordileone
