= Thagamuta =

Africa Proconsularis (125 AD)

Thagamuta was a Roman–Berber city in the province of Byzacena. The location of the town is not definitively known, but it was on the plain of Guemouda in modern Tunisia.

Thagamuta was also the seat of an ancient bishopric. There are three known (ancient) bishops of this Catholic diocese.

- Lupiano who participated at the Council of Carthage (397).
- Then at the Council of Carthage (411) the Catholic bishop Milico attended. There appears to have been no Donatist bishop at this time.
- In 484 Restitutus attended the synod called in Carthage by the Vandal king Huneric, after which Restitutus was exiled.

Today the bishopric survives as a titular bishopric and the current bishop is Jeffrey Robert Haines, of Archdiocese of Milwaukee. He replaced Júlio Endi Akamine in 2017.
