= Roman Richard Atkielski =

American Roman Catholic auxiliary bishop

Most Reverend Roman Richard Atkielski
- Auxiliary Bishop of Milwaukee
- In office: August 28, 1947 - June 30, 1969

Orders
- Ordination: May 30, 1930

Personal details
- Born: Roman Richard Atkielski; August 5, 1898 Milwaukee, Wisconsin
- Died: June 30, 1969 (aged 70) Milwaukee, Wisconsin
- Denomination: Catholic Church

Roman Richard Atkielski (August 5, 1898 – June 30, 1969) was a Roman Catholic auxiliary bishop of the Roman Catholic Archdiocese of Milwaukee serving from 1947 until 1969.

== Biography ==
Born in Milwaukee, Wisconsin, the son of Frank and Catherine Atkielski, Roman worked as a cutter at a fur factory before his ordination.

Atkielski was ordained to the priesthood on May 30, 1930. On August 2, 1947, Pope Pius XII appointed Atkielski bishop, and he was consecrated bishop on August 28, 1947. He was also the titular bishop of Stobi, after Manuel Raimundo de Melo.

Bishop Atkielski is listed among the Council Fathers of the Second Vatican Council, Session One, 11 October 1962 to 8 December 1962.

Bishop Atkielski was in office until his death.

Catholic Church titles
Preceded by –	Auxiliary Bishop of Milwaukee; 1947–1969	Succeeded by –
