= Nostra Signora di Guadalupe a Monte Mario =

Nostra Signora di Guadalupe in Mont Mario
- Our Lady of Guadalupe on Mount Mario (in English); Santa Mariæ de Guadalupe in Monte Malo (in Latin)
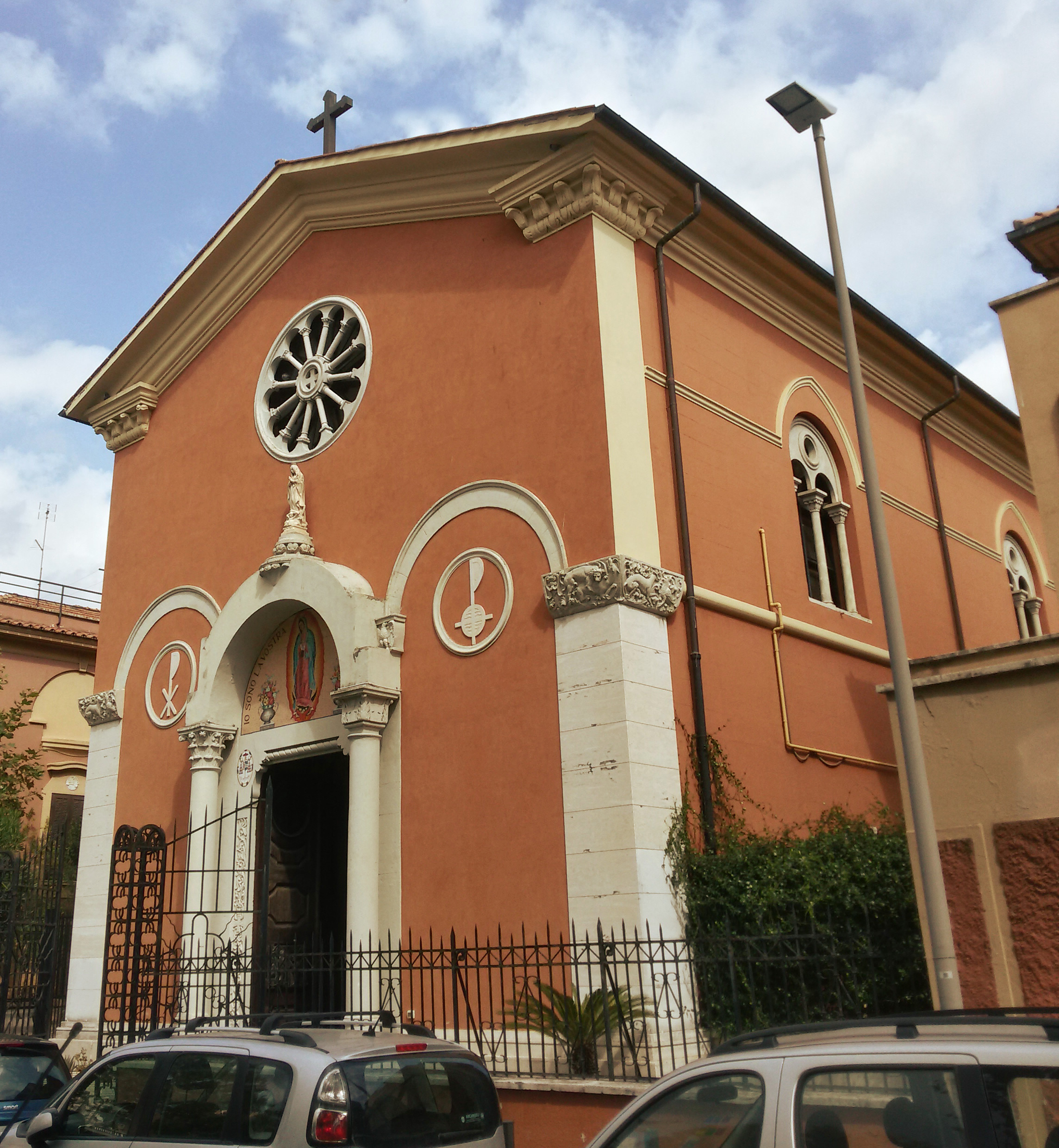
- Facade
- Click on the map for a fullscreen view
- 41°56′38″N 12°25′27″E
- Location: Piazza Nostra Signora di Guadalupe 12, Rome
- Country: Italy
- Denomination: Roman Catholic
- Tradition: Roman Rite

History
- Status: Titular church
- Dedication: Mary, mother of Jesus (as Our Lady of Guadalupe)
- Consecrated: 1932

Architecture
- Architectural type: Church
- Groundbreaking: 1928
- Completed: 1932

Specifications
- Length: 38 m (125 ft)
- Width: 14 m (46 ft)

Administration
- District: Lazio
- Province: Rome

The church of Nostra Signora di Guadalupe a Monte Mario is a place of Catholic worship in Rome, in the suburbs Della Vittoria, in the square Our Lady of Guadalupe.

== History ==
It was built between 1928 and 1932 by the Daughters of Mary Immaculate of Guadalupe and dedicated to Our Lady of Guadalupe, patroness of Mexico. The church was later sold to the diocese of Rome, who transformed it into the parish: it was established June 22, 1936 with the decree of the Cardinal Vicar Francesco Marchetti Selvaggiani Dominici Gregis. The church is home to the cardinal's title of "Our Lady of Guadalupe a Monte Mario", founded by Pope Paul VI April 29, 1969. Timothy M. Dolan is the incumbent cardinal-protector since 2012.

== Description ==
On the high altar of the church is placed the image of Our Lady of Guadalupe, the work of a Mexican priest donated to Pope Leo XIII in 1880 and then donated in 1929 by Pius XI to Mexican nuns. Pius XII in 1955 proclaimed Our Lady of Guadalupe "Queen of labor": at that time the image was placed a crown, made by the engraver Guido Veroi. The presbytery, of exquisite workmanship, is an altar made of perforated white marble.

== Cardinal Priest ==
Pope Paul VI established it as a titular church on 30 April 1969.

- Miguel Darío Miranda y Gómez, 30 April 1969 appointed-15 March 1986 died
- Franz Hengsbach, 28 June 1988 appointed-24 June 1991 died
- Adolfo Antonio Suárez Rivera, 26 November 1994 appointed-22 March 2008 died
- Timothy M. Dolan, 18 February 2012 appointed- present
