= Adolfo Suárez Rivera =

Mexican cardinal

His Eminence Adolfo Antonio Suárez Rivera
- Cardinal, Archbishop Emeritus of Monterrey
- Archdiocese: Monterrey
- Installed: 8 November 1983
- Term ended: 25 January 2003
- Predecessor: José de Jesús Tirado Pedraza
- Successor: Francisco Robles Ortega
- Other posts: Bishop of Tepic; Cardinal-Priest of Nostra Signora di Guadalupe a Monte Mario

Orders
- Ordination: 8 March 1952 by Alfonso Carinci
- Consecration: 15 August 1971 by Carlo Martini
- Created cardinal: 26 November 1994 by John Paul II
- Rank: Cardinal-Priest

Personal details
- Born: 9 January 1927 San Cristóbal de las Casas, Chiapas, Mexico
- Died: 22 March 2008 (aged 81) Monterrey, Nuevo León, Mexico

Adolfo Antonio Suárez Rivera (9 January 1927 – 22 March 2008) was a Mexican cardinal in the Catholic Church who also served as Bishop of Tepic, Tlalnepantla and Archbishop of Monterrey.

Suárez Rivera studied classical literature at the conciliar seminary of Chiapas in San Cristóbal, where he was ordained a priest in 1952, and then philosophy at the archdiocesan seminary of Xalapa and the Pontifical Seminary of Montezuma in Montezuma, New Mexico, in the United States. After these studies, he completed a doctorate in theology at the Pontifical Gregorian University in Rome.

Suárez Rivera worked for about ten years as a professor of classical literature and philosophy at the diocesan seminary of San Cristóbal de las Casas, then was a department head and secretary in the Archdiocesan Curia. He advised the Christian Family Movement and helped found the Union for Mutual Episcopal Aid in the 1960s and 1970s, in addition to serving as a parish priest.

In 1971, Suárez Rivera was named Bishop of Tepic. From 1979 to 1983, he served as an adjunct member of the Congregation for Bishops, and he was a delegate to the 1983 Sixth General Assembly of the Synod of Bishops on Reconciliation and Penance.

From 8 November 1983 until 25 January 2003 he served as Archbishop of Monterrey. He was made a cardinal by Pope John Paul II in the consistory of 26 November 1994, and given the title of Cardinal-Priest of Nostra Signora di Guadalupe a Monte Mario.

Although eligible to vote in the 2005 papal conclave that elected Pope Benedict XVI, Suárez Rivera was one of only two cardinal electors unable to attend for medical reasons (the other being Jaime Sin of the Philippines).

The cardinal died on Holy Saturday, 22 March 2008, in Monterrey, Nuevo León, Mexico.
