= Archdiocese of Milwaukee =

Latin Catholic ecclesiastical jurisdiction in Wisconsin, United States

Coordinates: 43°04′07″N 87°52′08″W

Archdiocese of Milwaukee Archidiœcesis Milvauchiensis
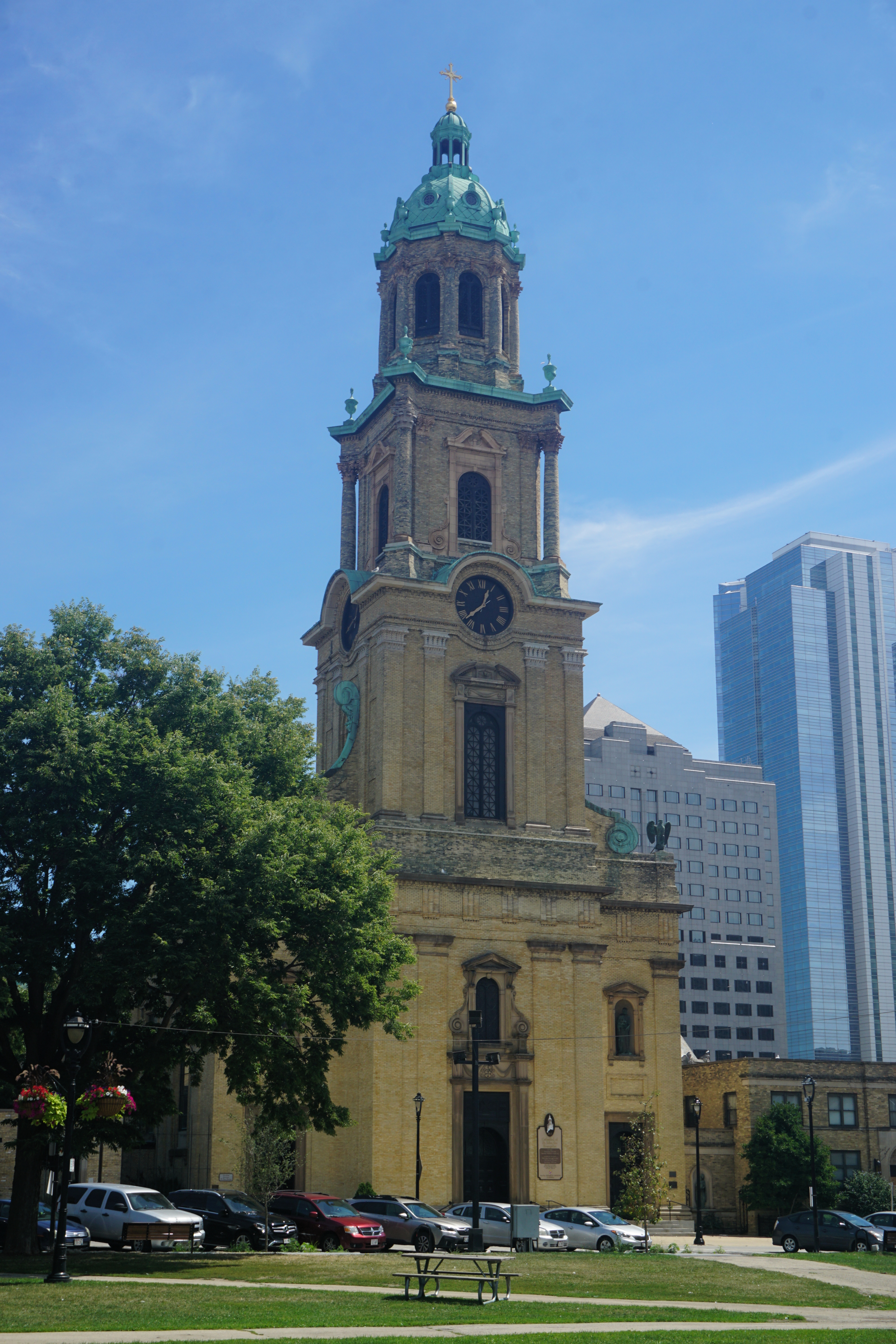
- Cathedral of St. John the Evangelist

- Coat of arms

Location
- Country: United States
- Territory: The City of Milwaukee and the counties of Dodge, Fond du Lac, Kenosha, Milwaukee, Ozaukee, Racine, Sheboygan, Walworth, Washington and Waukesha in the state of Wisconsin
- Ecclesiastical province: Milwaukee

Statistics
- Area: 4,758 sq mi (12,320 km^{2})
- Population: Total; Catholics: (as of 2013); 2,369,000; 673,000 (28.4%)
- Parishes: 204
- Schools: 111

Information
- Denomination: Catholic
- Sui iuris church: Latin Church
- Rite: Roman Rite
- Established: November 28, 1843 (182 years ago); Elevated to Archdiocese on February 12, 1875
- Cathedral: Cathedral of St. John the Evangelist
- Patron saint: John the Evangelist
- Secular priests: 334

Current leadership
- Pope: Leo XIV
- Archbishop: Jeffrey S. Grob
- Auxiliary Bishops: Jeffrey Robert Haines; James Thomas Schuerman
- Vicar General: Reverend Juan Manuel Camacho
- Bishops emeritus: Jerome Edward Listecki

Map
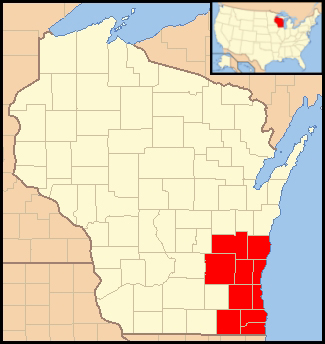

Website
- archmil.org

The Archdiocese of Milwaukee (Latin: Archidiœcesis Milvauchiensis) is an archdiocese of the Catholic Church in southeast Wisconsin in the United States. It is the metropolitan see of the ecclesiastical province of Milwaukee. Formed in 1843, it was elevated from a diocese to an archdiocese in 1875. Jeffrey S. Grob is the archbishop.

== Territory ==
The Archdiocese of Milwaukee encompasses the City of Milwaukee along with the following counties: Dodge, Fond du Lac, Kenosha, Milwaukee, Ozaukee, Racine, Sheboygan, Walworth, Washington and Waukesha.

== History ==
=== 1630 to 1800 ===
The first Catholic presence in present-day Wisconsin was that of French Catholic missionaries in the Green Bay area in the 17th century. When French explorer Jean Nicolet entered the Green Bay areas in 1634, he was followed by Jesuit missionaries. Wisconsin became part of the French colony of New France. Claude-Jean Allouez celebrated Mass with a Native American tribe near present-day Oconto in December 1669, the feast of St. Francis Xavier. He established the Saint Francis Xavier Mission there. The mission moved to Red Banks for a short time in 1671, and then to De Pere, where it remained until 1687, when it was burned. The missionaries worked with the Meskwaki, Sauk, and Ho-Chunk tribes, protected by Fort Francis near Green Bay. When the fort was destroyed in 1728, the missionaries left the area.

When the French and Indian War ended in 1763, the British took control of the Wisconsin area. During the 18th century, the few Catholics in Wisconsin were governed by the Diocese of Louisiana and the Two Floridas, based in New Orleans. After the American Revolution ended in 1791, the new United States took over Wisconsin.

=== 1800 to 1843 ===
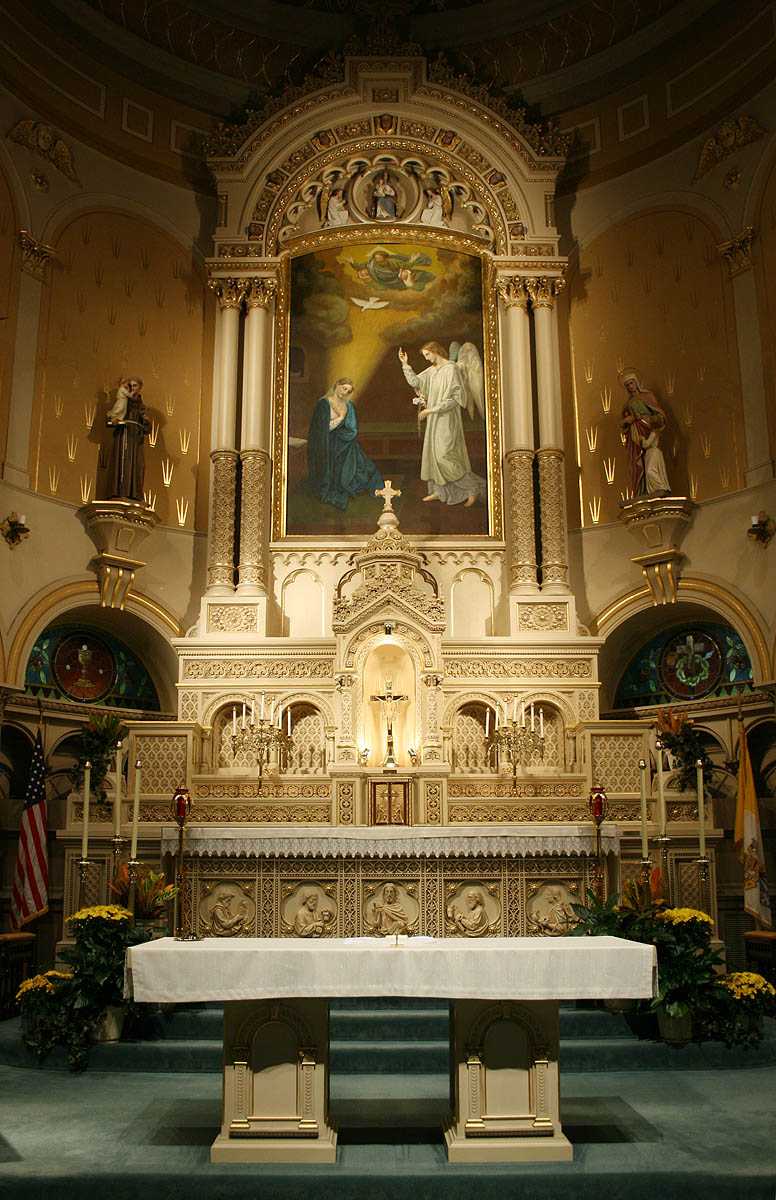
Annunciation altarpiece at Old St Mary's Church

Catholic jurisdiction for the new Wisconsin Territory passed to the Diocese of Bardstown in 1808, then the Diocese of Cincinnati in 1826. The first new Catholic church in the Wisconsin area in over 100 years was constructed in Fort Howard in 1825. Its parishioners included many French Canadians living in the settlement.

In 1833, the new Diocese of Detroit assumed jurisdiction over the area. In 1837, the missionary Florimund J. Bonduel traveled from Green Bay to visit the French fur trader Solomon Juneau in Milwaukee. While in Milwaukee, Bonduel celebrated the first mass in that city.

Later in 1837, the Diocese of Detroit sent Patrick Kelly to Milwaukee to serve as its first resident priest. Kelly celebrated mass in the Milwaukee courthouse until 1839, when St. Peter's, the first Catholic church in the city, opened. In 1841, Coadjutor Bishop Pierre-Paul Lefevere of Detroit visited Milwaukee.

=== 1843 to 1875 ===
In November 1843, Pope Gregory XVI erected the Diocese of Milwaukee, taking its territory from the Diocese of Detroit. The new diocese covered all of the Wisconsin Territory, including part of present-day Minnesota. John Henni was the first bishop.

When Henni took office, he only had four priests ministering to a few Catholics immigrants from Germany and Ireland. The only church in the diocese was St. Peter's, which was deeply in debt. Henni in 1845 founded St. Francis Seminary, allowing the seminarians to stay in his residence. He also invited several orders of nuns and priests to serve in Milwaukee.

In 1846, Henni completed Old St. Mary's Church in Milwaukee, the second Catholic church in Milwaukee. Designed by architect Victor Schulte in the Zopfstil style, St. Mary's initially served German immigrants. The Annunciation altarpiece in St. Mary's, painted by Franz Xavier Glink was donated to the diocese by King Ludwig I of Bavaria. In 1847, Henni laid the foundation of the new cathedral, St. John the Evangelist. Also designed by Schulte, the cathedral was built with Cream City brick, fabricated locally. St. John the Evangelist was consecrated by Archbishop Gaetano Bedini, the papal nuncio of the United States, in 1853.

In 1850, Pope Pius IX erected the Diocese of St. Paul, taking Minnesota from the Diocese of Milwaukee. In 1866, he erected the Dioceses of La Crosse and Green Bay, removing their territories from the Diocese of Milwaukee.

=== 1875 to 1889 ===
In 1875, Pius IX elevated the Diocese of Milwaukee to an archdiocese, with Henni as first archbishop. In 1880, Bishop Michael Heiss of La Crosse was appointed coadjutor archbishop of Milwaukee by Pope Leo XIII to assist Henni. Heiss served as pastor of St. Mary's and rector of St. Francis Seminary. At Saint Francis, Heiss trained German-speaking priests to serve German Catholics of the archdiocese. In one of his last acts, Henni oversaw the opening of Marquette University in Milwaukee in August 1881. After Henni died two days later, Heiss automatically became the next archbishop of Milwaukee.

=== 1889 to 1903 ===
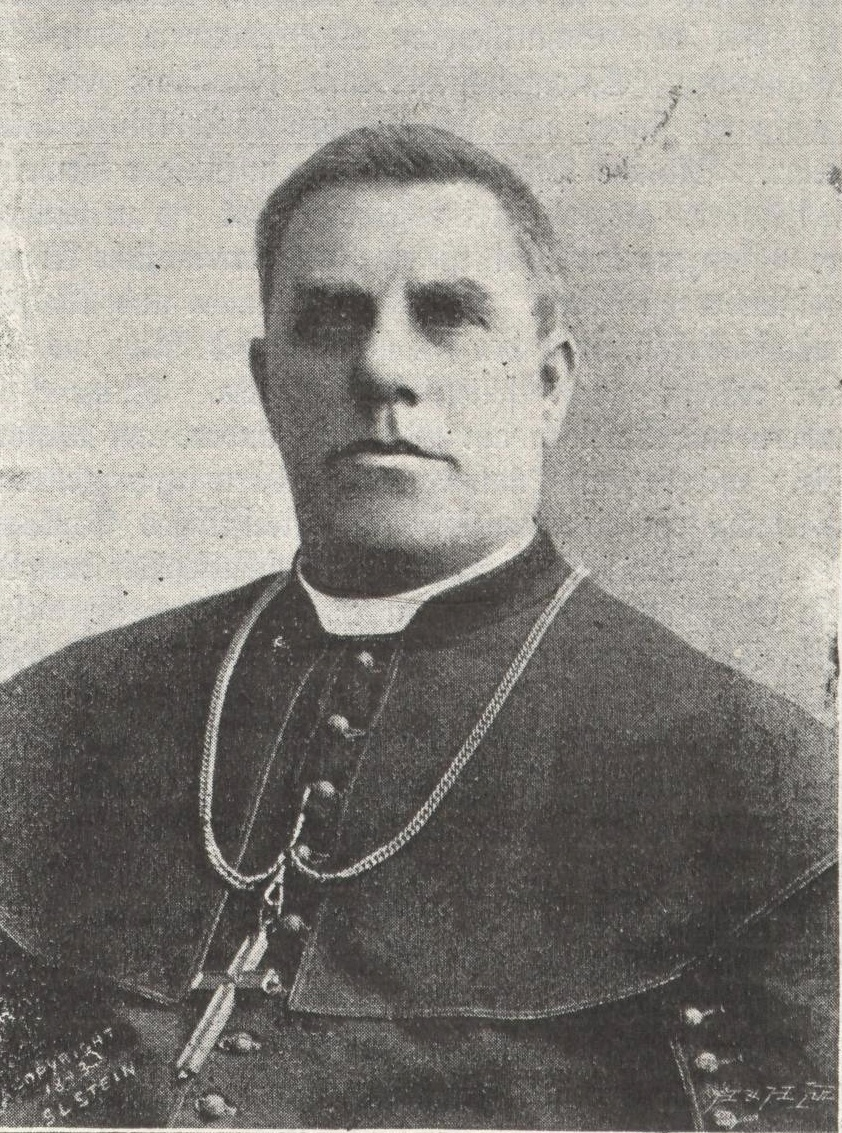
Archbishop Frederick Katzer

In 1889, the Wisconsin Legislature passed the Bennett Law which required all primary and secondary schools in the state to teach major subjects in English. The law was bitterly resented by German-American communities, both Catholic and Lutheran, that ran schools teaching in German. It was also opposed by Polish and Norwegian communities in Wisconsin. There was less opposition from Irish Catholics. The law was endorsed and promoted by the anti-Catholic American Protective Association. Heiss was opposed to the law.

After Heiss died in 1890, Frederick Katzer became the next archbishop. At the beginning of Katzer's tenure in 1891, the archdiocese had 227 priests, 268 churches, and 125 parochial schools to serve a Catholics population of 180,000.

Katzer strongly opposed the Bennett law. The outpouring of anti-Catholic sentiment from the law's supporters soon moved Irish Catholics against it. A prominent Irish newspaper, the Catholic Citizen, labeled the Bennett Law a convergence of "all the sectarian, bigoted, fanatical and crazy impurities" within the Republican Party which had taken the reins of power. When the Democratic Party regained power in Wisconsin, it repealed the Bennett Law in 1891.

=== 1903 to 1940 ===
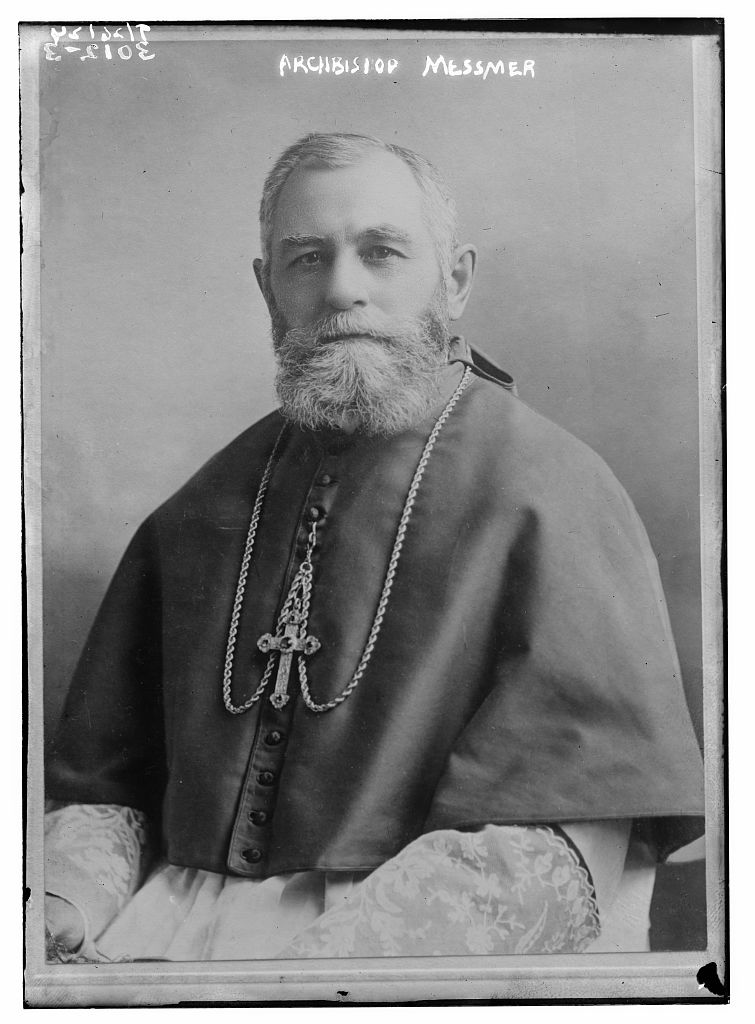
Archbishop Sebastian Gebhard Messmer

When Katzer died in 1903, there were 329 priests, 321 churches, 148 parochial schools, and 280,861 Catholics in the archdiocese. Leo XIII replaced Katzer in 1903 with Bishop Sebastian Messmer of Green Bay. In 1921, he prohibited Catholic children in Milwaukee from participating in a Fourth of July pilgrim pageant, which he described as "exclusively a glorification of the Protestant pilgrims," but later withdrew his objections. Messmer drew criticism from Polish Catholics after condemning the Kuryer Polski newspaper in Milwaukee.

During his 26-year tenure, Messmer established Mount Mary College in Milwaukee and saw the elevation of Marquette College to Marquette University. He actively supported the American Federation of Catholic Societies as well as ministries for African American and Hispanic Catholics. Nearly 30 religious orders were founded in the archdiocese and charitable institutions were doubled during his administration. He founded the Catholic Herald, the archdiocese's official newspaper, in 1922. Messmer died in 1930.

Following Messmer's death, Bishop Samuel Stritch from the Diocese of Toledo became the fifth archbishop of Milwaukee. A fire partially destroyed the Cathedral of John the Evangelist in 1935. Stritch was an advocate for Catholic Action and the Catholic Youth Organization. An opponent of the controversial priest Charles Coughlin, he once wrote a letter to a Milwaukee rabbi in which he rebuked those who "gain and hold a popular audience, degrade themselves and abuse the trust reposed in them by misquoting, half-quoting, and actually insinuating half-truths." In 1939, Stritch was appointed archbishop of the Archdiocese of Chicago.

=== 1940 to 1977 ===
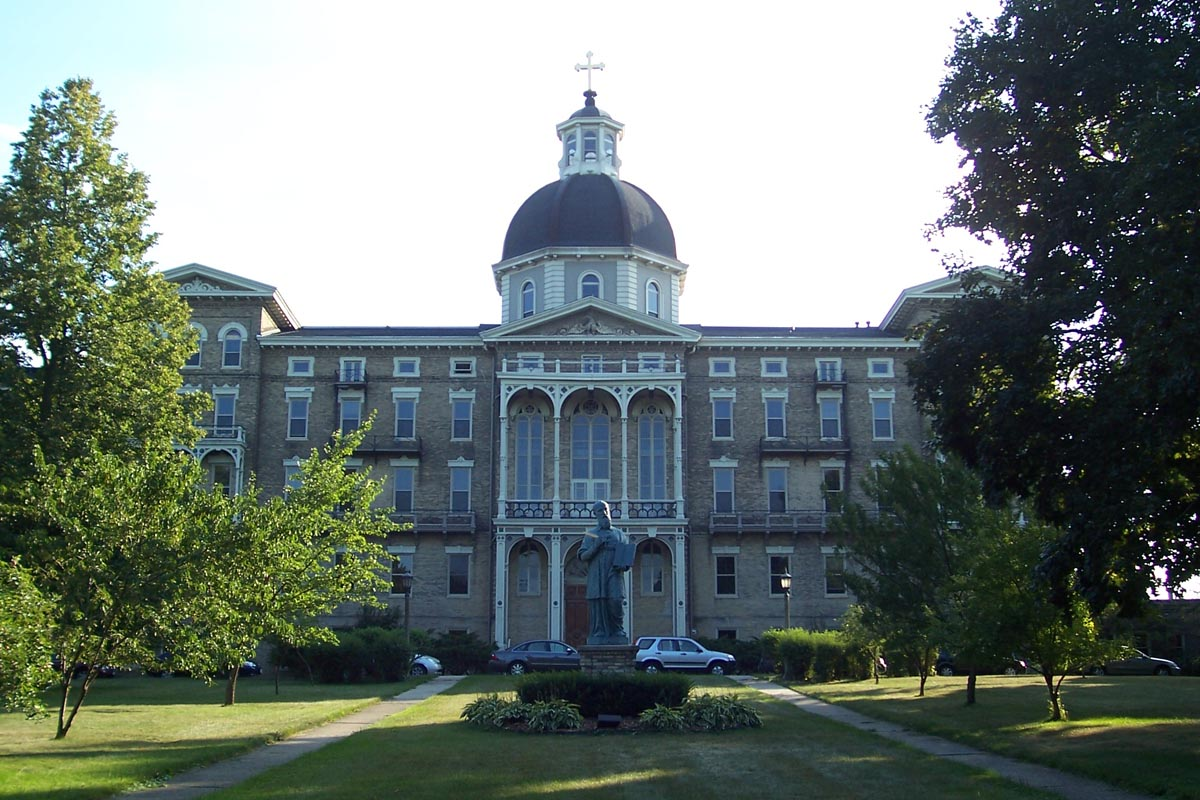
Saint Francis de Sales Seminary, St. Francis, Wisconsin

Pope Pius XII in 1940 appointed Bishop Moses E. Kiley of the Diocese of Trenton as the next archbishop of Milwaukee. Kiley oversaw an extensive renovation of the fire-damaged Cathedral of St. John the Evangelist, which reopened in 1942. He also led the rebuilding of St. Aemillian Orphanage in Milwaukee, which had also suffered major fire damage in the 1930s. Kiley oversaw the renovation of St. Francis Seminary, the move to change Pio Nono High School in St. Francis into a minor seminary, and created a Catholic Family Life Bureau in 1948. Kiley died in 1953.

Bishop Albert Meyer of the Diocese of Superior was appointed archbishop of Milwaukee in 1953. Five years later, in 1958, he became archbishop of Chicago. Bishop William Cousins from the Diocese of Peoria was the next archbishop of Milwaukee. During the American civil rights movement, Cousins was pressured to respond to the activities of James Groppi, an activist priest who led several civil rights marches and protests. In 1967, Cousins expressed his support for open housing and Groppi's other objectives, triggering a backlash from some Catholics in the archdiocese.

In 1971, Cousins sold a 180-acre tract of archdiocesan land to a commercial developer. Facing opposition for the move, he cited the need to finance programs for the poor in the face of a $4 million debt. After the archdiocese refused several requests from Groppi to be assigned to an African-American parish, he resigned from the priesthood in 1976. Cousins retired in 1977 after 35 years as archbishop of Milwaukee.

=== 1977 to present ===
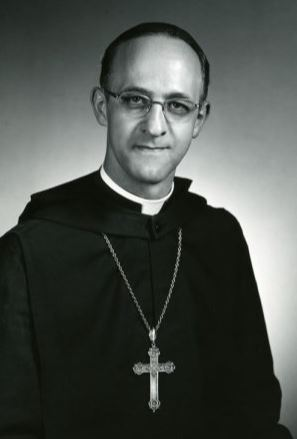
Abbot Primate Rembert Weakland

In 1977, Pope Paul VI appointed Rembert Weakland, abbot primate of the Benedictine Confederation, as archbishop of Milwaukee. One of Weakland's first actions was to sell the suburban home where his predecessor had lived and move to the cathedral rectory. Weakland gave support for the Milwaukee AIDS Project. Amidst abortion controversies, Weakland participated in public "listening sessions", encouraging Catholic women to share their views on the issue.

In early 2002, Weakland submitted his resignation as archbishop to the Vatican. While Weakland was waiting for his resignation to be accepted, the news media in May 2002 reported that the archdiocese had paid a $450,000 settlement in 1998 to Paul Marcoux, a former seminarian. In 1979, Marcoux had told church authorities about his long-term relationship with Weakland. Weakland publicly admitted to the affair after the story broke and apologized during a church service. Later that month, the Vatican accepted his resignation.

The next archbishop of Milwaukee was Auxiliary Bishop Timothy M. Dolan of St. Louis, named by John Paul II in 2001. Dolan took a special interest in priests and vocations, and the number of seminary enrollments rose during his tenure. In 2009, Dolan was appointed archbishop of New York. To replace Dolan, Pope Benedict XVI named Bishop Jerome E. Listecki of La Crosse in 2009. The archdiocese filed for Chapter 11 bankruptcy protection in January 2011 after it failed to reach a settlement with two dozen victims of sexual abuse by Catholic clergy."

In March 2023, Listecki removed the right to hear confession and give absolution from James Connell, a retired archdiocesan priest. In an opinion article in USA Today, Connell had expressed support for a proposed Delaware law that would invalidate the clergy-penitent privilege in cases that involved sexual abuse.

On January 14, 2025, Jeffrey Grob, formerly an auxiliary bishop of the Archdiocese of Chicago, was installed as the new Archbishop of Milwaukee.

=== Sexual abuse scandal ===
A 2003 report released by the Wisconsin Senate listed 58 priests from the Archdiocese of Milwaukee with credible accusations of sexual abuse of children. In the report, Archbishop Weakland admitted allowing priests guilty of child sex abuse to continue in ministry without warning parishioners or alerting the police. Weakland stated in his 2009 autobiography that in the early years of the sexual abuse scandal, he did not understand that child sexual abuse was a crime.

In July 2011, the archdiocese launched "a national advertising campaign to notify sex abuse victims of their deadline to file claims. As of early 2012, approximately 550 people were asking for restitution for alleged sexual abuse by clergy in the archdiocese. It paid financial settlements to claimants funded "through various sources, including insurance, loans and the sale of property", and funds were set aside to pay for therapy.

In March 2019, the archdiocese announced that it would remove the names of Cousins and Weakland from buildings in the archdiocese due to their poor handling of sex abuse cases.

== Demographics ==
The archdiocese houses one provincial seminary (St. Francis de Sales Seminary). As of 2025, it had an enrollment of 89 seminarians. It oversees 94 elementary schools, 13 high schools, and five colleges and universities. Also included in the archdiocese are 12 Catholic hospitals and nine Catholic cemeteries.

== Bishops ==
=== Bishop of Milwaukee ===
John Henni (1844–1875), elevated as Metropolitan Archbishop of Milwaukee.

=== Archbishops of Milwaukee ===
1. John Henni (1875–1881)
2. Michael Heiss (1881–1890)
3. Frederick Katzer (1890–1903)
4. Sebastian Gebhard Messmer (1903–1930)
5. Samuel Stritch (1930–1940), appointed Metropolitan Archbishop of Chicago (1940–1958) and later Cardinal-Priest of Sant'Agnese fuori le mura (1946–1958) and Pro-Prefect of the Sacred Congregation for the Propagation of the Faith (1958)
6. Moses E. Kiley (1940–1953)
7. Albert Gregory Meyer (1953–1958), appointed Metropolitan Archbishop of Chicago (1958–1965) and later Cardinal-Priest of Santa Cecilia in Trastevere (1959–1965)
8. William Edward Cousins (1959–1977)
9. Rembert Weakland (1977–2002)
10. Timothy Michael Dolan (2002–2009), appointed Metropolitan Archbishop of New York (2009–2025) and later Cardinal-Priest of Nostra Signora di Guadalupe a Monte Mario (2012–present)
11. Jerome Edward Listecki (2010–2024)
12. Jeffrey S. Grob (2025–present)

=== Auxiliary Bishops ===
- Joseph Maria Koudelka (1911–1913), appointed Bishop of Superior (1913–1921)
- Edward Kozłowski (1914–1915)
- Roman Richard Atkielski (1947–1969)
- Leo Joseph Brust (1969–1991)
- Richard J. Sklba (1979–2010)
- William P. Callahan (2007–2010), appointed Bishop of La Crosse (2010–2024)
- Donald J. Hying (2011–2015), appointed Bishop of Gary (2015–2019) and later Bishop of Madison (2019–present)
- Jeffrey Robert Haines (2017–present)
- James T. Schuerman (2017–present)

=== Other diocesan priests who became bishops ===
- Augustine Francis Schinner, appointed first Bishop of Superior (1905–1913) and later first Bishop of Spokane (1914–1925)
- Aloisius Joseph Muench, appointed Bishop of Fargo (1935–1959) and later Apostolic Nuncio to Germany (1951–1959) and Cardinal-Priest of San Bernardo alle Terme (1959–1962)
- Raphael Michael Fliss, appointed Coadjutor Bishop of Superior (1979–1985) and later Bishop of Superior (1985–2007)
- Francis Joseph Haas, appointed Bishop of Grand Rapids (1943–1953)
- William Patrick O'Connor, appointed Bishop of Superior (1942–1946) and later first Bishop of Madison (1946–1967)
- Jerome J. Hastrich, appointed Auxiliary Bishop of Madison (1963–1969) and later Bishop of Gallup (1969–1990)
- Paul Francis Tanner, appointed Bishop of Saint Augustine (1968–1979)
- Fabian Bruskewitz, appointed Bishop of Lincoln (1992–2012)
- James Michael Harvey, appointed Prefect of the Papal Household (1998–2012) and later Archpriest of the Basilica of Saint Paul Outside the Walls (2012–present) and Cardinal-Deacon of San Pio V a Villa Carpegna (2012–present)
- Joseph N. Perry, appointed Auxiliary Bishop of Chicago (1998–2023)
- David John Malloy, appointed Bishop of Rockford (2012–present)

== Churches ==
=== Basilicas ===
- Basilica of St. Josaphat – Milwaukee
- Holy Hill National Shrine of Mary, Help of Christians – Hubertus

=== Shrines ===
- Archdiocesan Marian Shrine – Milwaukee
- Shrine of the Schoenstatt Apostolic Movement – Milwaukee; founded by Schoenstatt founder Joseph Kentenich
- Shrine of the Schoenstatt Apostolic Movement – Waukesha; founded by Kentenich

== Schools ==
Main articles: List of Schools in the Roman Catholic Archdiocese of Milwaukee and List of former schools in the Roman Catholic Archdiocese of Milwaukee

== Suffragans ==
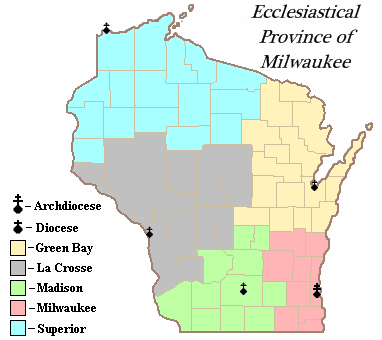
Ecclesiastical Province of Milwaukee

The Ecclesiastical Province of Milwaukee comprises the entire state of Wisconsin and includes four suffragan dioceses.

- Diocese of Green Bay
- Diocese of La Crosse
- Diocese of Madison
- Diocese of Superior
