= Jerome E. Listecki =

American Roman Catholic prelate

His Excellency, The Most Reverend Jerome Edward Listecki
- Archbishop Emeritus of Milwaukee
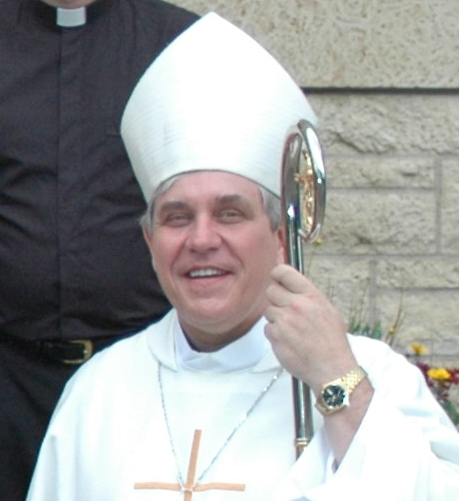
- Archdiocese: Milwaukee
- Appointed: November 14, 2009
- Installed: January 4, 2010
- Retired: November 4, 2024
- Predecessor: Timothy M. Dolan
- Successor: Jeffrey S. Grob
- Previous posts: Bishop of La Crosse (2004–2009); Auxiliary Bishop of Chicago and Titular Bishop of Nara (2000–2004)

Orders
- Ordination: May 14, 1975 by John Cody
- Consecration: January 8, 2001 by Francis George, John George Vlazny, and James Patrick Keleher

Personal details
- Born: Jerome Edward Listecki; March 12, 1949 (age 77) Chicago, Illinois, United States
- Denomination: Catholic
- Residence: Milwaukee, Wisconsin
- Education: Loyola University of Chicago; University of Saint Mary of the Lake; DePaul University; Pontifical University of Saint Thomas Aquinas
- Motto: Life is Christ

Styles of Jerome Edward Listecki
- Reference style: His Excellency; The Most Reverend
- Spoken style: Your Excellency
- Religious style: Archbishop

Jerome Edward Listecki (born March 12, 1949) is an American prelate of the Roman Catholic Church. He served as the eleventh archbishop of the Roman Catholic Archdiocese of Milwaukee from 2010 to 2025.

Listecki previously served as an auxiliary bishop of the Archdiocese of Chicago (2001–2004) and as Bishop of La Crosse (2004–2009).

== Biography ==
=== Early years ===
Listecki was born in Chicago, Illinois, and raised on the Southeast Side. His father (d. 1986) owned a tavern before working as a bus driver for the Chicago Transit Authority. Jerome received his early education at the parochial school of St. Michael the Archangel Church before attending Quigley Preparatory Seminary South, from where he graduated in 1967. He earned a Bachelor of Arts degree from Saint Joseph College Seminary in 1971, and completed his theological studies at St. Mary of the Lake Seminary (in Mundelein, Illinois). During his summers as a seminarian, he worked in a blast furnace sintering plant in the US Steel mills near Chicago.

=== Ordination and ministry ===
Listecki was ordained to the priesthood by Cardinal John Cody on May 14, 1975.

After studies in canon law and moral theology in Rome, Listecki earned a licentiate and doctorate in canon law from the Pontifical University of St. Thomas Aquinas (Angelicum) in 1981 with a dissertation entitled Indissolubility and the United Methodist Church. He previously earned a Juris Doctor degree from DePaul University. During his service to the Archdiocese of Chicago, he taught at both Quigley Preparatory Seminary North (later Archbishop Quigley Preparatory Seminary) and St. Mary of the Lake Seminary, served in a number of Chicago parishes and as pastor of St. Ignatius Church, worked within the Archdiocesan Chancery as an Appellate Judge for the Matrimonial Tribunal and separately as in-house legal counsel for the Archdiocese of Chicago from 1985 to 1987, and served as the chaplain to the Catholic Physicians' Guild of Chicago.

His media experience included co-hosting the Chicago radio station WIND program "Catholic Conversation" from 1978 to 1979, his regular participation as celebrant for the WGN TV "Mass for Shut-ins", as well as service as a producer for several other television programs.

=== Auxiliary Bishop of Chicago ===
On November 7, 2000, Listecki was appointed titular bishop of Nara and auxiliary bishop for the Archdiocese of Chicago by Pope John Paul II. He was consecrated on January 8, 2001.

Ordination history of Jerome E. Listecki
History
Episcopal consecration
- Consecrated by: Francis George OMI (Chicago)
- Date: January 8, 2001
Episcopal succession
Bishops consecrated by Jerome E. Listecki as principal consecrator
- Donald J. Hying: July 20, 2011
- James Powers: February 18, 2016
- Jeffrey Haines: March 17, 2017
- James Schuerman: March 17, 2017

=== Bishop of La Crosse, Wisconsin ===
On December 29, 2004, Listecki was appointed Bishop of the Diocese of La Crosse, succeeding Bishop Raymond Leo Burke who became archbishop of the Archdiocese of St. Louis, Missouri, in St. Louis, Missouri. On March 1, 2005, he was installed as Bishop of the Diocese of La Crosse.

At La Crosse he initiated a $50 million fundraising campaign, a planning process to restructure ministry and parishes in the diocese, and was instrumental in the development of the Shrine of Our Lady of Guadalupe, a project initiated by his predecessor, Bishop Burke.

=== Archbishop of Milwaukee, Wisconsin ===
Bishop Listecki was named Archbishop of Milwaukee by Pope Benedict XVI on November 14, 2009. He was installed on January 4, 2010, by the Apostolic Nuncio to the United States of America, Archbishop Pietro Sambi. As Archbishop of Milwaukee, the metropolitan see of the Ecclesiastical Province of Milwaukee (the entire state of Wisconsin), he received the pallium on June 29, 2010, from Pope Benedict XVI.

Listecki served as an Army Reserve chaplain in the United States Army Reserve for 20 years, retiring as a lieutenant colonel.

Liesticki's resignation as archbishop was accepted on November 4, 2024.

== Criticism ==
The Survivors Network of those Abused by Priests (SNAP) criticized Archbishop Listecki on January 6, 2010, for allowing retired archbishops Rembert Weakland of Milwaukee and Daniel Edward Pilarczyk of Cincinnati, who were implicated in covering up of cases of sexual abuse, to say Mass at St. John's Cathedral in Milwaukee. On January 12, 2010, during a hearing of the Wisconsin State Senate on a bill to extend the statute of limitations for reporting abuse as supported by Milwaukee District Attorney John T. Chisholm, state Senator Glenn Grothman joined in this criticism, and also questioned Listecki on why he allowed Weakland, who had been accused of moving around abusive priests, to keep his title as emeritus Archbishop of Milwaukee, as well as retaining the name Weakland Center on the pastoral center at St. John's Cathedral. Listecki testified against the bill, saying it would single out Catholic institutions and bankrupt the Milwaukee Archdiocese.

Listecki was publicly criticized in February 2010 by Jerry Matysik, the Eau Claire Police Chief, and SNAP for allegedly misleading the Wisconsin State Legislature about the LaCrosse diocese abuse notification procedure in Listecki's testimony against extending the statute of limitations, stating, "Archbishop Listecki appears more interested in protecting the organization than he is in protecting children," and again in August 2010 by SNAP for passing up action on an abuse claim due to lack of evidence.

The Archbishop apologized to victims of clergy sexual abuse on March 30, 2010, in a statement that said that both the individual perpetrators, as well as the bishops who failed to stop the abuse, "go against everything the Church and the priesthood represent." He credited the bravery of "victim-survivors" who persisted in bringing their cases to light and forcing the Church to change. "We owe these victims/survivors our deep gratitude and we acknowledge our own actions have not always expressed that gratitude adequately." He defended Pope Benedict XVI's role in the matter:

[M]istakes were made in the Lawrence Murphy case. The mistakes were not made in Rome in 1996, 1997 and 1998. The mistakes were made here, in the Archdiocese of Milwaukee, in the 1970s, the 1980s and the 1990s, by the Church, by civil authorities, by Church officials, and by bishops. And for that, I beg your forgiveness in the name of the Church and in the name of this Archdiocese of Milwaukee.

Three years later, the New York Times commented,

It is disturbing that the current Milwaukee leader, Archbishop Jerome Listecki, said last week that the church underwent an "arc of understanding" across time to come to grips with the scandal – as if the statutory rapes of children were not always a glaring crime in the eyes of society as well as the church itself.

Listecki was likely referring to the "learning curve" that psychiatrists and the clergy whom they advised experienced when it became clear, in about 2002, that pedophiles were not often likely to be cured of their tendencies.

== See also ==
- Catholic Church hierarchy
- Catholic Church in the United States
- Historical list of the Catholic bishops of the United States
- List of Catholic bishops of the United States
- Lists of patriarchs, archbishops, and bishops

Catholic Church titles
Preceded by Timothy M. Dolan	Archbishop of Milwaukee; 2010–2024	Succeeded by Jeffrey S. Grob
Preceded by Raymond Leo Burke	Bishop of La Crosse; 2004–2009	Succeeded by William P. Callahan
Preceded by –	Auxiliary Bishop of Chicago; 2001–2004	Succeeded by –
