= Richard J. Sklba =

American Roman Catholic prelate (1935–2024)

His Excellency, The Most Reverend Richard John Sklba
- Auxiliary Bishop of Milwaukee
- See: Milwaukee
- Appointed: November 6, 1979
- Installed: December 19, 1979
- Retired: October 18, 2010
- Other post: Titular Bishop of Castro di Puglia (1979–2024)

Orders
- Ordination: December 20, 1959 by Martin John O’Connor
- Consecration: December 19, 1979 by Rembert Weakland, William Edward Cousins, and Robert Fortune Sanchez

Personal details
- Born: September 11, 1935 Racine, Wisconsin, U.S.
- Died: November 21, 2024 (aged 89) Milwaukee, Wisconsin, U.S.
- Buried: Cathedral of St. John the Evangelist, Milwaukee
- Denomination: Catholic Church
- Education: St. Francis Seminary; Pontifical Biblical Institute; Pontifical University of Saint Thomas Aquinas

Styles of Richard John Sklba
- Reference style: His Excellency; The Most Reverend
- Spoken style: Your Excellency
- Religious style: Bishop

Richard John Sklba (September 11, 1935 – November 21, 2024) was an American prelate of the Catholic Church who served as an auxiliary bishop of the Archdiocese of Milwaukee from 1979 to 2010.

== Early life ==
Richard Sklba was born on September 11, 1935, in Racine, Wisconsin. He attended St. Catherine's High School in Racine for two years, then entered St. Francis Seminary in St. Francis, Wisconsin. In 1954, Sklba entered the Pontifical Gregorian University in Rome, earning a Bachelor of Philosophy degree and a Master of Theology degree.

== Priesthood ==
On December 20, 1959, Sklba was ordained to the priesthood by Archbishop Martin O’Connor for the Archdiocese of Milwaukee. After his ordination, Sklba served as assistant pastor at St. Mary's Parish in Elm Grove, Wisconsin, for two years.

In 1962, Sklba returned to Rome to study at the Pontifical Biblical Institute and the Pontifical University of St. Thomas Aquinas. In 1965, he earned a Doctor of Sacred Theology degree with a dissertation entitled "The teaching function of the Pre-exilic Israelite priesthood."

After returning to Wisconsin in 1965, Sklba performed weekend pastoral work at St. Veronica Parish in Milwaukee, and taught scripture at St. Francis Seminary for the next 11 years.

== Auxiliary Bishop of Milwaukee ==
On November 6, 1979, Pope John Paul II appointed Sklba as an auxiliary bishop of Milwaukee and titular bishop of Castro di Puglia. He was consecrated on December 19, 1979 by Archbishop Rembert Weakland, with Archbishops William Cousins and Robert Sanchez serving as co-consecrators.Sklba has been a member of the Catholic Biblical Association of America since 1968 and was named its president in 1982.

In 1998, Sklba delivered a eulogy at the funeral of Lawrence Murphy, an archdiocese priest. In the eulogy, Sklba alluded to good work done by Murphy, but stated that "some shadows had been cast on his ministry". Before his death, Murphy had admitted to sexually abusing 30 students at St. John's School for the Deaf in St. Francis, Wisconsin, and was suspected in 200 additional cases. Critics accused Sklba of grossly understating Murphy's crimes against children.

From 2005 to 2008, Sklba served as chair of the United States Conference of Catholic Bishops' (USCCB) Committee on Ecumenical and Interreligious Affairs. In this capacity, following Pope Benedict XVI's reformulation of the Good Friday prayer for the Jews in the Tridentine Mass, Sklba stated:

"Central to the concerns of the Holy Father is the clear articulation that salvation comes through faith in Jesus Christ and his church. It is a faith that must never be imposed but always freely chosen. The Catholic Church in the United States remains steadfastly committed to deepening its bonds of friendship and mutual understanding with the Jewish community."

On October 18, 2010, Benedict XVI accepted Sklba's letter of resignation as auxiliary bishop of Milwaukee.

== Death ==
Sklba died in his sleep at his residence in Milwaukee on November 21, 2024, at the age of 89.

== See also ==
- Catholic Church hierarchy
- Catholic Church in the United States
- Historical list of the Catholic bishops of the United States
- List of Catholic bishops of the United States
- Lists of patriarchs, archbishops, and bishops

Catholic Church titles
Preceded by –	Auxiliary Bishop of Milwaukee; 1979–2010	Succeeded by –
Preceded by Peter Shirayanagi	Titular Bishop of Castro di Puglia; 1979–2024	Succeeded by Vacant
