= Rembert Weakland =

American Benedictine monk and bishop (1927–2022)

The Most Reverend Rembert George Weakland OSB
- Archbishop of Milwaukee
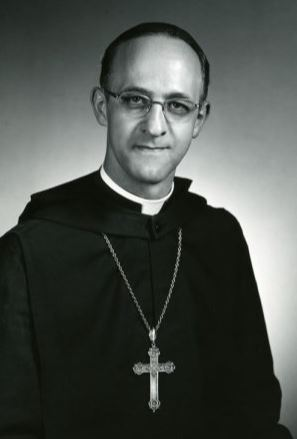
- Weakland upon his accession to Abbot-Primate in 1967
- Archdiocese: Milwaukee
- Appointed: September 20, 1977
- Installed: November 8, 1977
- Term ended: May 24, 2002
- Predecessor: William Edward Cousins
- Successor: Timothy Michael Dolan
- Previous posts: Coadjutor Archabbot of Saint Vincent Archabbey (1963); Archabbot of Saint Vincent Archabbey (1963–1967); Abbot Primate of the Benedictine Confederation (1967–1977)

Orders
- Ordination: June 24, 1951 by Simone Salvi
- Consecration: November 8, 1977 by Jean Jadot

Personal details
- Born: George Samuel Weakland; April 2, 1927 Patton, Pennsylvania, U.S.
- Died: August 22, 2022 (aged 95) Greenfield, Wisconsin, U.S.
- Denomination: Roman Catholic
- Parents: Basil Weakland (father); Mary Kane (mother)
- Education: Saint Vincent College; Saint Vincent Seminary; Pontifical Atheneum of St. Anselm; Juilliard School; Columbia University
- Motto: Aequalis omnibus caritas (Charity is equal for all)

Styles of Rembert George Weakland
- Reference style: His Excellency; The Most Reverend
- Spoken style: Your Excellency
- Religious style: Archbishop

Rembert George Samuel Weakland OSB (April 2, 1927 – August 22, 2022) was an American Catholic prelate who served as Archbishop of Milwaukee from 1977 to 2002. Weakland previously served as Abbot Primate of the Benedictine Confederation from 1967 to 1977.

During his leadership of the Benedictines and episcopate in Milwaukee, Weakland was known for his theological liberalism and seen as a champion of the Church's progressive wing. His image within the Church was tarnished by the 2002 revelation that he had a decade-long romantic relationship with a man, which resulted in his resignation. Weakland's handling of the sexual abuse cases within his Archdiocese, which only became fully public after his resignation, was the cause of considerable controversy.

== Biography ==
=== Early life ===
George Weakland was born on April 2, 1927, in Patton, Pennsylvania, to Basil Weakland (1897–1932) and Mary Kane (1898–1978). He had four sisters: Leora, Elizabeth, Barbara, and Marian; and a brother William. Weakland attended Our Lady of Perpetual Help School in Patton, Pennsylvania, and then enrolled at the minor seminary run by the Benedictine monks of Saint Vincent Archabbey in Latrobe, Pennsylvania.

In 1945, Weakland entered the novitiate of the archabbey, taking the religious name of Rembert. In September 1946, he went on to study at Saint Vincent College and Saint Vincent Seminary, also in Latrobe. He made his solemn profession as a monk on September 29, 1949, at Solesmes Abbey in France. The archabbot then sent Weakland to study theology at the Pontifical Atheneum of St. Anselm in Rome.

=== Early priesthood ===
On June 24, 1951, Weakland was ordained to the priesthood for the Benedictine order by Bishop Simone Salvi at Subiaco Abbey near Rome. He furthered his studies in music in Italy, France, and Germany, as well as at the Juilliard School and Columbia University, both in New York City.

While researching at the British Library in London, Weakland discovered the text of a medieval liturgical drama, the Play of Daniel. He then released an authoritative text with commentary. The drama has been frequently staged by musical groups, such as the New York Pro Musica. From 1957 to 1963, Weakland taught music at St. Vincent College.

=== Archabbot and abbot primate ===
Weakland was elected coadjutor archabbot of St. Vincent Archabbey on June 26, 1963. He soon succeeded to the office and received the solemn blessing of an archabbot from Bishop William G. Connare of the Diocese of Greensburg, on August 29, 1963. Following this, Weakland became chancellor and then chair of the board for the college. On May 8, 1964, he received a papal appointment as consultor to the Commission for Implementing the Constitution on the Sacred Liturgy of the Second Vatican Council and was appointed a member of that commission in 1968.

On September 29, 1967, Weakland was elected the abbot primate of the Benedictine Confederation; he was re-elected in 1973. During this period, he served as chancellor ex officio of the Pontifical Atheneum of St. Anselm. He also served as a member of the Vatican Council of Superiors General from 1968 until 1977.

In 1968, Weakland presided over an international, inter-religious monastic conference near Bangkok, Thailand. During the conference, the American Trappist monk and writer Thomas Merton died. Weakland administered last rites to Merton and arranged for a U.S. military airplane to fly his remains back to the United States.

=== Archbishop of Milwaukee ===
On September 20, 1977, Pope Paul VI appointed Weakland as Archbishop of Milwaukee. He was consecrated on November 8 in the Cathedral of St. John the Evangelist in Milwaukee by Archbishop Jean Jadot. One of Weakland's first actions was to sell the four-bedroom suburban home used by his predecessor and move to the cathedral rectory.

Weakland's tenure was divisive due to his pronounced liberal views and liturgical experiments. While unapproachable to some and jarring in his coverups for abusive priests, he also sought to reach Catholics on the margins of church and society. He gave support for the Milwaukee AIDS Project. Amidst abortion controversies, Weakland participated in public listening sessions, encouraging Catholic women to share their views on the issue.

In 1999, Weakland received a doctorate in musicology – "with distinction" – from Columbia University, for his thesis on "The Office Antiphons of the Ambrosian Chant".

== Rape allegation and fallout ==
On May 24, 2002, Pope John Paul II accepted Weakland's resignation as Archbishop of Milwaukee, shortly after his age-mandated resignation request at the age of 75. His retirement was overshadowed by revelation of a large payout to prevent a lawsuit. The archdiocese had paid $450,000 to Paul Marcoux, a former seminarian studying at Marquette University, to settle a "date rape" claim he made against Weakland more than two decades earlier, stemming from a long-term relationship with him. Weakland admitted to the affair and apologized after the story broke, while denying accusations of rape.

Following his retirement, Weakland twice announced he was moving to a Benedictine abbey, first to his former home at St. Vincent Archabbey, then to St. Mary's Abbey in Newark New Jersey. However, the Benedictines rescinded both invitations. In 2009, Weakland announced that he was gay in his memoir A Pilgrim in a Pilgrim Church: Memoirs of a Catholic Archbishop.

In March 2019, the archdiocese announced that it was removing Weakland's name from buildings in the archdiocese. The Weakland Center, which houses parish offices and outreach initiatives, was renamed on March 22, 2019.

In his later years, Weakland was in poor health, being in hospice care in his condo in Milwaukee. He died on August 22, 2022, at his residence in Greenfield, Wisconsin, following a long illness. A public Mass of Christian burial was offered by Archbishop Jerome Listecki at the Cathedral of St. John the Evangelist on August 30, 2022. Weakland's remains were interred at the cemetery of St. Vincent Archabbey on September 1, 2022.

== Sex abuse cover-ups ==
In 1984, Weakland responded to teachers in a Catholic school who were reporting sexual abuse by local priests by stating "any libelous material found in your letter will be scrutinized carefully by our lawyers". The Wisconsin Court of Appeals rebuked him for this, calling his remarks "abrupt" and "insensitive". In 1994, Weakland said those reporting sexual abuse were "squealing". He later apologized for the remarks.

According to the Milwaukee Journal Sentinel, a deposition released in 2009 revealed that Weakland shredded reports about sexual abuse by priests. Weakland admitted allowing priests guilty of child sex abuse to continue in ministry without warning parishioners or alerting the police. He stated in his autobiography that in the early years of the sexual abuse scandal, he did not understand that child sexual abuse was a crime.

== Liturgical controversy ==
In 1965 to 1966, Weakland served as president of the Church Music Association of America (CMAA). According to an account by Richard Schuler, a split emerged very quickly. In 1966, having attended the Fifth International Church Music Congress in August, organized by the Consociatio Internationalis Musicae Sacrae (CIMS), Weakland criticized the "reactionary attitudes in liturgical thinking" that he said were present at the meeting. In interviews with the press, he expressed regret that the meeting failed to include modern music and dancing in its liturgical agenda. His views did not prevail within the CMAA and he resigned the presidency later that year.

In 2000, Weakland was a critic of the Congregation for the Doctrine of the Faith's document Dominus Iesus on religious relativism. One of his last major actions as archbishop was to effect a controversial renovation of the Cathedral of St. John the Evangelist.

== Interfaith efforts ==
Involved in interreligious initiatives, it was during Weakland's time as Abbot Primate of the Benedictine Confederation that DIMMID (Dialogue Interreligieux Monastique - Monastic Interreligious Dialogue) was founded in 1977. Created under the directive of Cardinal Sergio Pignedoli, it was suggested as part of a monastic interreligious dialogue with Buddhists and others.

== See also ==
- Catholic Church hierarchy
- Catholic Church in the United States
- Historical list of the Catholic bishops of the United States
- List of Catholic bishops of the United States
- Lists of popes, patriarchs, primates, archbishops, and bishops
- Roman Catholic Archdiocese of Milwaukee

Catholic Church titles
Preceded by Benno Gut	Abbot Primate of the Benedictine Confederation; 29 September 1967 – 20 September 1977	Succeeded by Viktor Josef Dammertz
Preceded by William Edward Cousins	Archbishop of Milwaukee; 20 September 1977 – 24 May 2002	Succeeded by Timothy Michael Dolan
