= William Edward Cousins =

American prelate

His Excellency, The Most Reverend William Edward Cousins
- Archbishop of Milwaukee titular bishop of Forma
- Installed: December 18, 1958
- Term ended: September 17, 1977
- Predecessor: Albert Gregory Meyer
- Successor: Rembert George Weakland
- Previous posts: Auxiliary bishop of Chicago (1948–1952); Bishop of Peoria (1952–1958)

Orders
- Ordination: April 13, 1927 by George Mundelein
- Consecration: March 7, 1949 by Samuel Stritch

Personal details
- Born: William Edward Cousins; August 20, 1902 Chicago, Illinois, US
- Died: September 14, 1988 (aged 86) Milwaukee, Wisconsin, US
- Buried: Cathedral of St. John the Evangelist, Milwaukee
- Education: Archbishop Quigley Preparatory Seminary; St. Mary of the Lake Seminary
- Motto: Auxilium meum a Domino; My help is from the Lord

William Edward Cousins (August 20, 1902 – September 14, 1988) was an American Catholic prelate who served as archbishop of Milwaukee in Wisconsin from 1958 to 1977. He previously served as an auxiliary bishop for the Archdiocese of Chicago in Illinois (1948–1952) and as bishop of Peoria in Illinois (1952–1958).

Cousin's reputation was tainted by allegations of his covering up sexual abuse by priests, prompting the Archdiocese of Milwaukee to remove his name from its pastoral center in 2019.

== Biography ==
=== Early life ===
William Cousins was born on August 20, 1902, in Chicago, Illinois. He studied at Archbishop Quigley Preparatory Seminary in Chicago and was a member of the first graduating class of St. Mary of the Lake Seminary in Mundelein, Illinois.

=== Priesthood ===
Cousins was ordained to the priesthood for the Archdiocese of Chicago by Cardinal George Mundelein on April 27, 1927. Following his ordination, Cousins served as an assistant pastor at St. Bernard Parish for five years and then at Holy Name Cathedral for a year. In 1933, he was appointed director of the Archdiocesan Mission Band, a group of priests who conducted missions throughout Chicago. He became pastor of St. Columbanus Parish in 1946.

=== Auxiliary Bishop of Chicago ===
On December 17, 1948, Cousins was appointed auxiliary bishop of Chicago and titular bishop of Forma by Pope Pius XII. He received his episcopal consecration on March 7, 1949, from Cardinal Samuel Stritch at the Cathedral of the Holy Name in Chicago, with Bishops John Boylan and Albert Zuroweste serving as co-consecrators.

=== Bishop of Peoria ===
Pius XII appointed Cousins as the fourth bishop of Peoria on May 21, 1952. He was installed at St. Mary's Cathedral in Peoria on July 2, 1952. During his tenure as bishop, Cousins established five new parishes and six new grade schools.

=== Archbishop of Milwaukee ===
Cousins was appointed as the eighth archbishop of Milwaukee by Pope John XXIII on December 18, 1958. From 1962 to 1965, Cousins attended the Second Vatican Council in Rome, during which he sat on the Commission on Communications Media and on the Lay Apostolate.

During the American civil rights movement in the 1960s, some groups in the archdiocese pressured Cousins to curb the activism of some priests. Most of these complaints centered on Reverend James Groppi, who led many civil rights marches and protests in Chicago. In 1967, Cousins stated his support for open housing, the movement against housing discrimination against minorities, and other objectives of Groppi. However, Cousins rejected some of his tactics.

=== Retirement and legacy ===
On September 17, 1977, Pope Paul VI accepted Cousins' resignation as archbishop of Milwaukee. William Cousins died in Milwaukee on September 14, 1988, at age 86.

In recent years, allegations have surfaced that Cousins was involved in the cover-up of child sexual abuse cases in the Milwaukee diocese. One notable case was that of Reverend Lawrence Murphy, whom Cousins allowed to relocate to the Diocese of Superior in 1974 after he received reports that Murphy sexually abused children. In March 2019, the archdiocese announced that it was removing Cousins' name from its buildings and institutions. That same month, the Cousins Catholic Center was renamed the Mary Mother of the Church Pastoral Center.

== See also ==
- Catholic Church in the United States
- Historical list of the Catholic bishops of the United States
- List of Catholic bishops of the United States
- Lists of patriarchs, archbishops, and bishops

Catholic Church titles
Preceded by Albert Gregory Meyer	Archbishop of Milwaukee; 1958–1977	Succeeded by Rembert George Weakland
Preceded by Joseph Henry Leo Schlarman	Bishop of Peoria; 1952–1958	Succeeded by John Baptist Franz
Preceded by –	Auxiliary Bishop of Chicago; 1948–1952	Succeeded by –
