= List of Wisconsin Badgers men's basketball head coaches =

This is a list of head men's basketball coaches at the University of Wisconsin–Madison:

Name	From	To
James C. Elsom	1899	1904
Emmett Angell	1905	1908
Haskell Noyes	1909	1911
Walter Meanwell	1912	1917
Guy Lowman	1918	1920
Walter Meanwell	1921	1934
Bud Foster	1935	1959
John Erickson	1960	1968
John Powless	1969	1976
Bill Cofield	1977	1982
Steve Yoder	1983	1992
Stu Jackson	1993	1994
Stan Van Gundy	1994	1995
Dick Bennett	1996	2000
Brad Soderberg^{#}	2000	2001
Bo Ryan	2001	2015
Greg Gard	2015	present

# Denotes interim head coach.
