= Geraldine Moodie =

Canadian photographer (1854–1945)

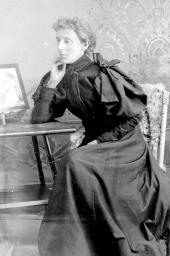
- Self portrait by Moodie
- Born: Géraldine Fitzgibbon; 31 October 1854; Toronto, Canada West
- Died: 4 October 1945 (aged 90)
- Known for: photographer

Geraldine Moodie (31 October 1854 – 4 October 1945) was a Canadian photographer who pioneered in capturing photos of early Canadian history. She is best known for her work with indigenous peoples in Northern Canada. Moodie is one of Canada's first professional female photographers. She opened photography studios in Battleford, Saskatchewan (1891), Maple Creek (1897), and Medicine Hat, Alberta (1897).

== Biography ==
Géraldine Fitzgibbon was born in Toronto, Ontario, Canada (which was Canada West at the time) on 31 October 1854 to Agnes and Charles Fitzgibbon. She was the granddaughter of author, Susanna Strickland Moodie. She was distantly related to Catherine Parr Trail. She married John Douglas Moodie, a distant relative of hers, in England in 1878.

The newly married couple returned to Canada, first moving to western Canada, where they briefly farmed in Manitoba, before moving to Ottawa. In 1885, her husband received a commission with the North-West Mounted Police (NWMP). The Moodies together had six children. Moodie began practicing amateur photography while raising children, primarily taking photos of plant life.

In 1895, Moodie opened a photography studio in Battleford, Saskatchewan, becoming the first woman in the region to do so; she often photographed the area's Indigenous communities. Living in rural Canada at the turn of the twentieth century, she found herself living in a world of male dominance and a lack of women with notable social status. Despite this adversity, she was far more successful and influential than her metropolitan counterparts.

== Career ==
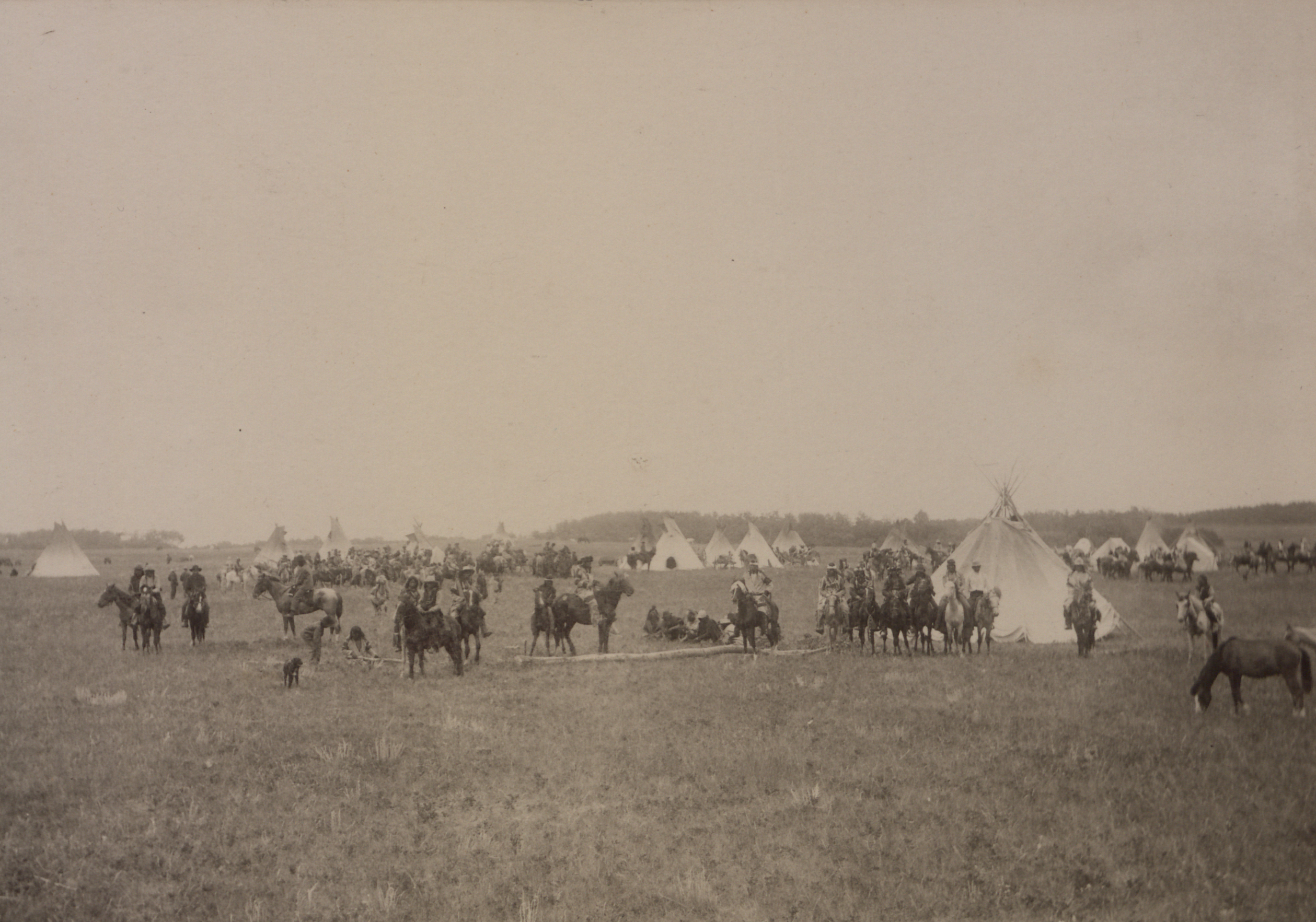
Photo taken by Moodie. "Raising the centre pole of the sundance tent", 1899

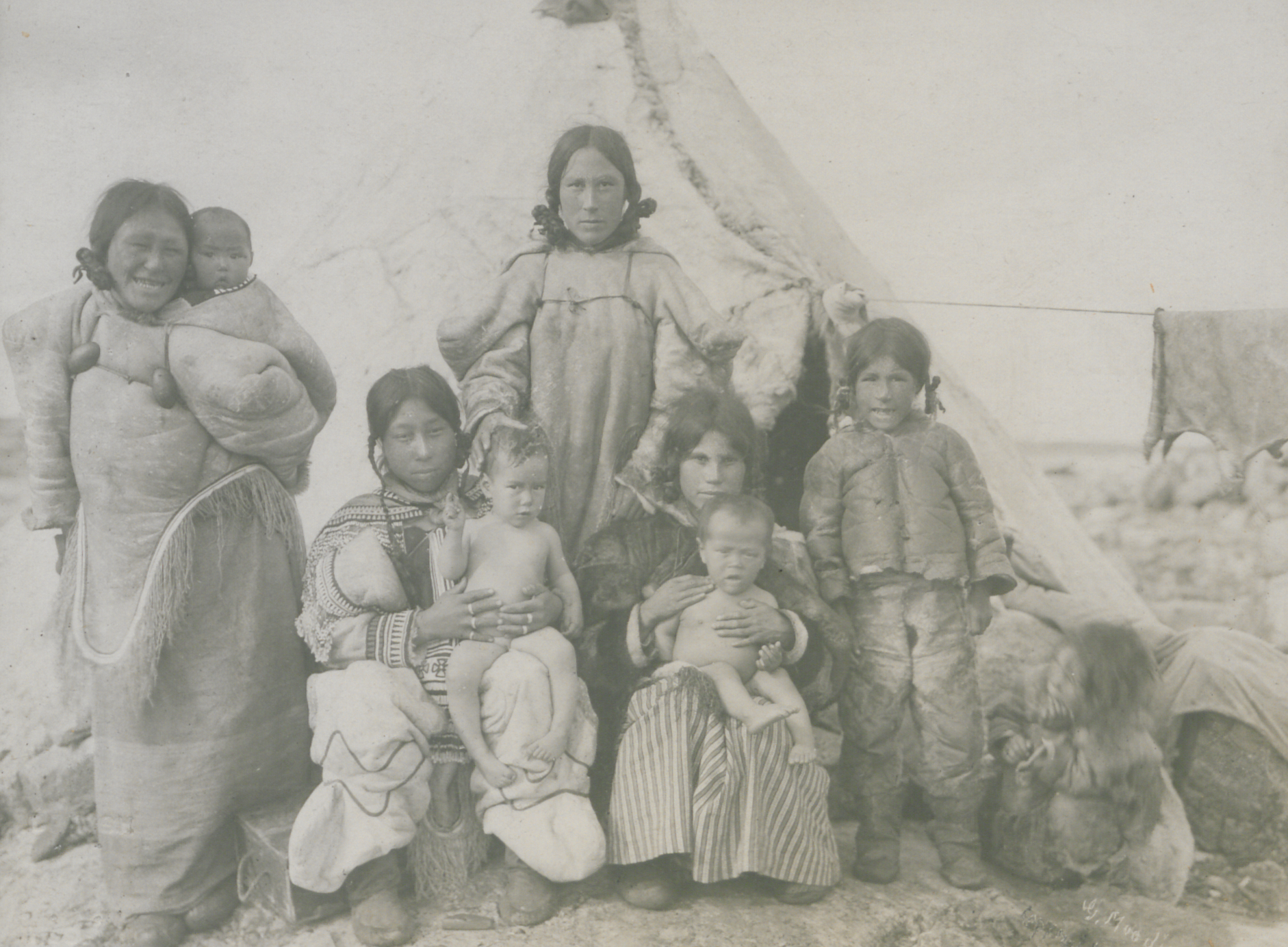
Some of her most notable women features Inuit, especially mothers and children

In addition to portraits, she took images of the mounted police, ranching, and wildflowers. She frequently accompanied her husband, John Douglas Moodie, on his travels, photographing the Innu people in the area of Hudson Bay (1904–1909). Moodie captioned her photographs with the names of her Indigenous subjects in Cree and Inuktitut, unlike the majority of her contemporaries.

She also took photographs around the city of Regina (1910–1911). Many of her photographs were in connection with her husband's work on the Canadian Pacific Railway, accompanying his reports to Prime Minister Wilfrid Laurier and CPR officials.

In her writings, she mentions needing to modify her techniques because of the glare of the snow and the harsh weather.

Her work was part of a 2017 exhibition, See North of Ordinary, The Arctic Photographs of Geraldine and Douglas Moodie, at the Glenbow Museum.

== Legacy ==
Moodie died in 1945 at the age of 90 and was buried in Burnsland Cemetery in Calgary, Alberta, Canada. Moodie's photographs are in museum permanent collections including, Glenbow Museum in Alberta, Canada; the British Museum in London, England; and others.

A stamp depicting Moodie's photograph, Koo-tuck-tuck, was issued on 22 March 2013 by Canada Post as part of their Canadian Photography series. The image shows a traditionally dressed Inuk woman.

== Publications ==
- Bassnett, Sarah; Parsons, Sarah (2023). Photography in Canada, 1839–1989: An Illustrated History. Toronto: Art Canada Institute. ISBN 978-1-4871-0309-5.
- White, Donny (1998). In Search of Geraldine Moodie. Regina, Canada: University of Regina Press. ISBN 978-0-88977-110-9.
- White, Donny (1999). Geraldine Moodie, An Inventory. Regina, Canada: University of Regina Press. ISBN 978-0-88977-099-7.

== See also ==
- Edward S. Curtis, American photographer whose work focused on the American West and on Native American peoples
- Felipe Lettersten, sculptor who cast sculptures of indigenous people
- Photography by indigenous peoples of the Americas
- Salvage ethnography
