= David Moores =

British football executive (1946–2022)

David Richard Moores

Honorary Life President of Liverpool F.C.
- In office 6 February 2007 – 22 July 2022

Chairman of Liverpool F.C.
- In office 18 September 1991 – 6 February 2007
- Preceded by: Noel White
- Succeeded by: Tom Hicks & George N. Gillett, Jr.

Personal details
- Born: 15 March 1946 Liverpool, Lancashire, England
- Died: 22 July 2022 (aged 76) Liverpool, Merseyside, England
- Spouses: Kathy Anders (m. 1976; died 1977) Marge Walmsley (m. 1983; died 2022)
- Profession: Football executive, chairman

David Richard Moores (15 March 1946 – 22 July 2022) was a British football executive, chairman of Liverpool F.C. from 1991 to 2007 and later the club's honorary life president.

== Liverpool F.C. ==
He became chairman of Liverpool F.C. on 18 September 1991. He owned 17,850 shares which represented 51% of the club. His uncle, Sir John Moores, was chairman of Everton F.C., although he was a small shareholder. John Moores created Littlewoods and made the Moores family one of the wealthiest in the UK. Littlewoods was sold in 2002 for £750m.

The family owned their stake in Liverpool F.C. for over 50 years. However, Moores increasingly sought external investment to help the club develop a new ground, and ended up selling it in 2007, to American investors Tom Hicks and George Gillett, in preference to Sheikh Mohammed and DIC. The deal turned sour soon after.

In 2010, Moores said that "significant shareholders like Granada and Steve Morgan were insistent the board of Liverpool F.C. should accept the Gillett and Hicks offer and left me in no doubt about my legal duty to accept the offer".

In a letter to The Times in May 2010, Moores admitted that he "hugely regrets" selling Liverpool to the American duo. Moores called on Gillett and Hicks to step aside and find a suitable buyer for the club. Moores wrote: "I call upon them now to stand back, accept their limitations as joint owners, acknowledge their role in the club's current demise, and stand aside, with dignity".

Under the chairmanship of Moores, Liverpool had a turbulent period between 1991 and 1994 under manager Graeme Souness. When Moores sacked Souness in January 1994, it was the first time a Liverpool manager had been sacked since 1956. Moores said at the time that the decision to sack Souness was made because "the results have been well below what is expected by the club and its supporters."

Under Moores, Liverpool went through their most barren spell for three decades. Though they won the most club competitions over the sixteen years, this excluded the most prized English Premiership. In 2005, Liverpool won a fifth UEFA Champions League after defeating AC Milan in the final.

After the departure of Moores, Kenny Dalglish returned to the manager's position amid rumours that he had wanted to return in the mid-1990s, but was frustrated by the hesitancy and inconsistency of the decision-makers at Liverpool. Dalglish returned as manager in January 2011 but left the club at the end of the 2011–12 season.

== Personal life ==
Moores's first wife Kathy Anders was a beauty queen and model, who became Miss England in 1974. After just 18 months of marriage, Anders died in a car crash in September 1977, aged 26, when Moores' Jaguar car overturned into a ditch on a quiet country road in Lancashire. Moores went to hospital with serious head injuries. It was the second family tragedy that year for the Moores family. Five months earlier in April 1977, Moores's elder brother Nigel died in a car crash in the South of France.

Moores was married to wife Marge in 1983 until her death in 2022. Moores was the heir to the Littlewoods Business empire. Lady Grantchester, daughter of Sir John Moores was the family head which was ranked joint 32nd in the 2009 Sunday Times Rich List with assets worth £1.2 bn.

Moores died at the age of 76 on 22 July 2022, just weeks after Marge's death. In October 2025, Moores was honoured at Liverpool's Kirkby training ground - a development he had spearheaded as Chairman - with the unveiling of a plaque in his memory; one of the Academy training pitches was also named in his honour.
