= Adrien Voisin =

American sculptor (1890–1979)

Adrien A. Voisin
- Born: Adrien Alexandre Voisin; Islip, New York, U.S.
- Died: May 8, 1979 (aged 88); Palos Verdes Estates, California, U.S.
- Resting place: Golden Gate National Cemetery
- Other names: Adrien Alexander Voisin, Adrien Alex Voisin
- Education: Yale School of Art, Beaux-Arts de Paris, École nationale supérieure des arts décoratifs, Académie Colarossi
- Occupations: Visual artist, poet, art conservator
- Known for: Sculptural busts of Native Americans and wild animal sculptures, architectural sculpture, public art memorials

Adrien Alexandre Voisin (1890–1979) was an American sculptor. He is known for his bronze work and for being one of the lead architectural sculptors at Hearst Castle.

== Early life and education ==
Adrien Alexandre Voisin was born in 1890 in the town of Islip in Suffolk County, New York, to parents from France. He was raised in Newport, Rhode Island. Voisin first learned the art of taxidermy and apprenticed as a woodcarver. In his early career he studied art under Elijah Baxter Jr. and William Sergeant Kendall at the Yale School of Fine Arts (now Yale School of Art).

He continued his art studies in France at the Beaux-Arts de Paris; the École nationale supérieure des arts décoratifs; and at Académie Colarossi. He also worked under Jean Antoine Injalbert and Antonin Mercié in France. While studying at Beaux-Arts de Paris, Voisin was using the Fonderie Valsuani an art bronze foundry, when he met the sculptor Alexander Calder, who was a few years older. Calder strongly disliked Voisin's work which he wrote about in his journal.

While in France during World War I, he served first in the American Volunteer Motor Ambulance Corps; and later served in the 49th Infantry Regiment in the United States Army. After the war he moved to California "for his health", as he had been exposed to mustard gas.

== Career ==
While living in southern California around 1919, he fulfilled multiple architectural commissions for sculptural works, including work on Hearst Castle. In 1927, he did architectural commission work for the Oriental Theatre in Portland, Oregon for an interior sculpture similar to a Khmer sculpture at Angkor Wat.

In 1929, he moved to Montana, to "live among the Indians" with the Blackfeet tribe. While living in Montana he completed bust sculptures of John Two Guns White Calf, Chief Bad Roads, and Mountain Chief (Ninastuko). One of his pupils was Blackfeet artist Albert Racine. Voisin returned to Paris in 1930 to exhibit his Native American bronze cast sculptures, which won him awards. A year later in 1931, he moved to Oregon.

In 1933, Voisin moved to San Francisco, where he purchased the Albion Castle, formally the home of the Albion Ale And Porter Brewing Company and a natural occurring mineral water spring. Over the span of almost 20 years he worked to restore the Norman-style stone building, using the aid of old photographs. In 1964, the property was purchased by the San Francisco Mountain Springs Water Company in order to use the springs. Voisin was allowed to remain living on the property beyond that date as a clause of the sale.

In 1971, the Gonzaga University in Spokane received 53 sculptures for their Pacific Northwest Indian Center (now known as the Northwest Museum of Arts and Culture). At the time of the donation, the center had planned an entire Voisin Gallery wing dedicated to his work.

== Death and legacy ==
Voisin died on May 8, 1979, in Palos Verdes Estates, California. He was preceded in death by his wife Frances Maude Voisin (née Vahuy) in 1965, and they are both buried in Golden Gate National Cemetery.

Voisin's work was part of the Bill and Dorothy Harmsen Art Collection at the Denver Art Museum, however in December 2004 the work was donated to the Colorado Community College System.

Voisin created notable portrait busts, included busts of Benjamin Franklin Irvine (1935), editor of The Oregon Journal; John Two Guns White Calf, a Piegan Blackfeet chief; and Vachel Lindsay, poet. He created public memorials including the Father McQuade Memorial and Fairfax Whelan Memorial Fountain.

== See also ==
- Chemical weapons in World War I
- Salvage ethnography
- Felipe Lettersten
