= Robert R. Bruno Jr. =

American artist, inventor, and businessman

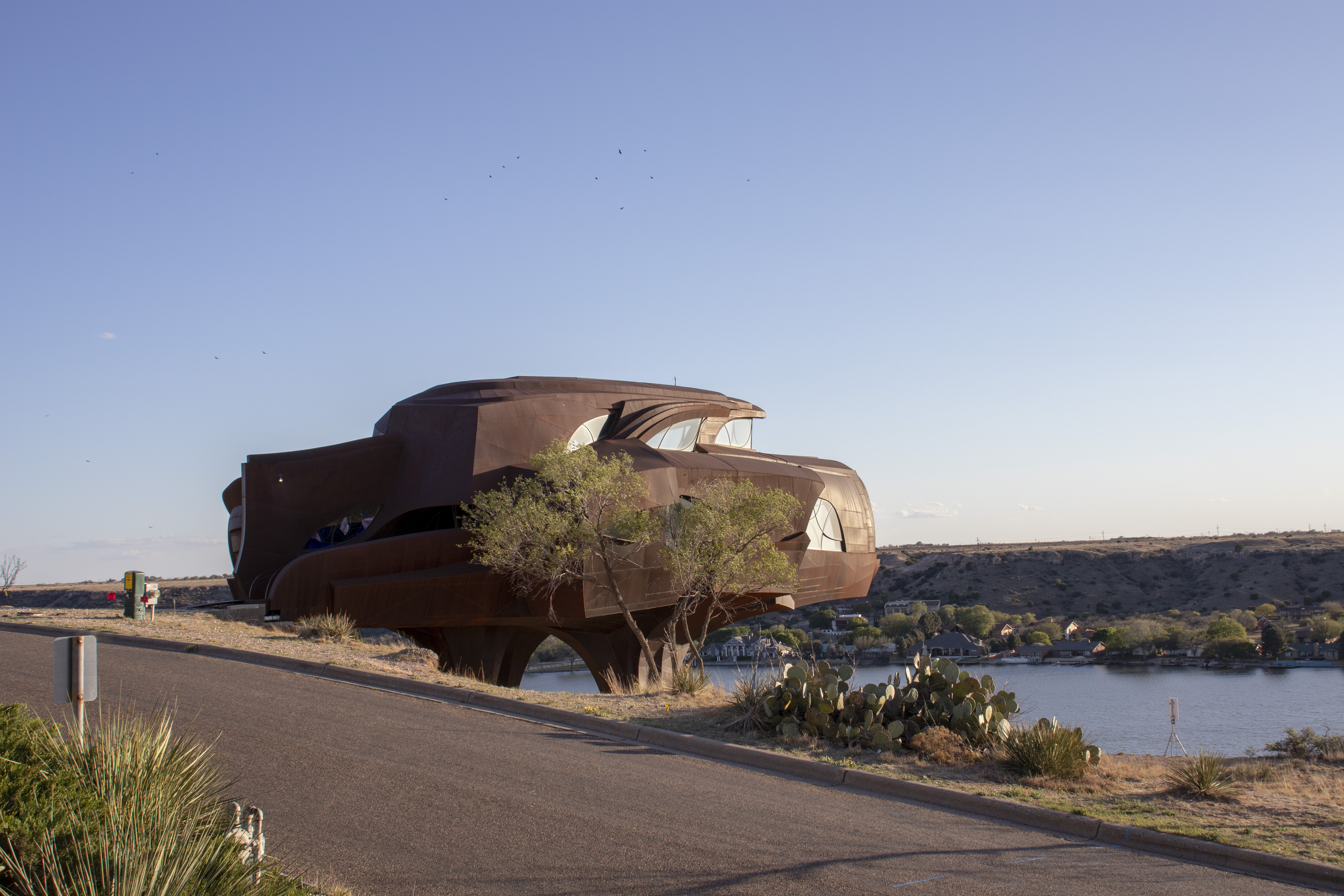
- Born: January 30, 1945; Los Angeles, California
- Died: December 9, 2008 (aged 63); Lubbock, Texas
- Monuments: Bruno Sculpture Plaza, TTU
- Education: Dominican College
- Occupations: Sculptor, artist, businessman
- Organization(s): Founder of P&R Irrigation
- Partner: Patricia Mills
- Children: Christina Bruno

Robert R. Bruno Jr. (January 30, 1945 – December 9, 2008) was an American artist, inventor, and businessman. In 1982, he designed and created one of the first solar-powered surge irrigation systems for row crops and founded P&R Surge Systems with his wife Patricia Mills. As an artist, he designed jewelry, furniture, and numerous sculptures both large and small. He is perhaps most widely recognized for the artistic steel house that sits on the edge of the jagged caprock escarpment that overlooks Yellow House Canyon in the residential community of Ransom Canyon a few miles east of Lubbock, Texas.

== Biography ==
Robert R. Bruno was born January 30, 1945, in Los Angeles, California. He was the son of Robert R. Bruno Sr. and Delores Puig and he had two sisters, Kathleen and Diane. He spent his early years shuttling between divorced parents in the United States and Mexico.

He attended Dominican College in Racine, Wisconsin, a now-defunct Catholic college, and continued to graduate school at the University of Notre Dame. At Dominican College, he began working with steel and completed numerous steel sculptures, some of which were installed in the backyard of his grandparents’ home in Vista, California.

At Dominican College he met Patricia Mills, a Catholic student on track to become a nun. They were married and soon moved to Lubbock, Texas, so that he could teach art and design at the School of Architecture at Texas Tech University. They had one child, a daughter named Christina. He died in Lubbock Texas on December 9, 2008 age 63

== Business career ==
During the 1970s, Bruno taught at Texas Tech while his wife worked at the High Plains Underground Water District, an organization charged with protecting and conserving precious groundwater resources across a large portion of the Llano Estacado.

Prior to the development of center pivot irrigation, cropland was typically watered by furrow irrigation, a rather inefficient method that resulted in considerable water losses due to evaporation and uneven infiltration. In 1979, an improved method of “surge irrigation” was developed by Stringham and Keller (1979). Learning of this new technology, Robert Bruno developed a surge valve system and the couple formed an irrigation company called P&R Surge Systems (the name being derived from their first initials). The company was successful and provided additional financial support for his art.

== Art ==
While teaching at Texas Tech University, Bruno completed a large steel sculpture that later became the inspiration for the Steel House at Ransom Canyon. It is in front of the Architecture Building.

Bruno began construction of the Steel House in 1973. This 2,200 sq ft (200 m^{2}) three-level house was constructed of numerous pieces of scrap steel carefully welded together forming an enormous curving form. It is estimated to weigh 110 tons and rests on four hollow legs anchored to the eastern rim of Yellow House Canyon. The steel house has many large smoothly curving windows, some composed of stained glass while others provide a panoramic view of Lake Ransom Canyon, 150 ft (46 m) below. It remained unfinished at his death; there were to have been a library and an aquarium inside the steel legs.

In 1991, Mark Lawson asked him to design another house to occupy a nearby vacant lot in Ransom Canyon. This house would be constructed of stone and tile instead of steel. Bruno, Rick Denser (general contractor), Manfred Kaiter (master stone mason), and Lawson started work on the rock house in 1991. It was inspired by the work of Antoni Gaudi.

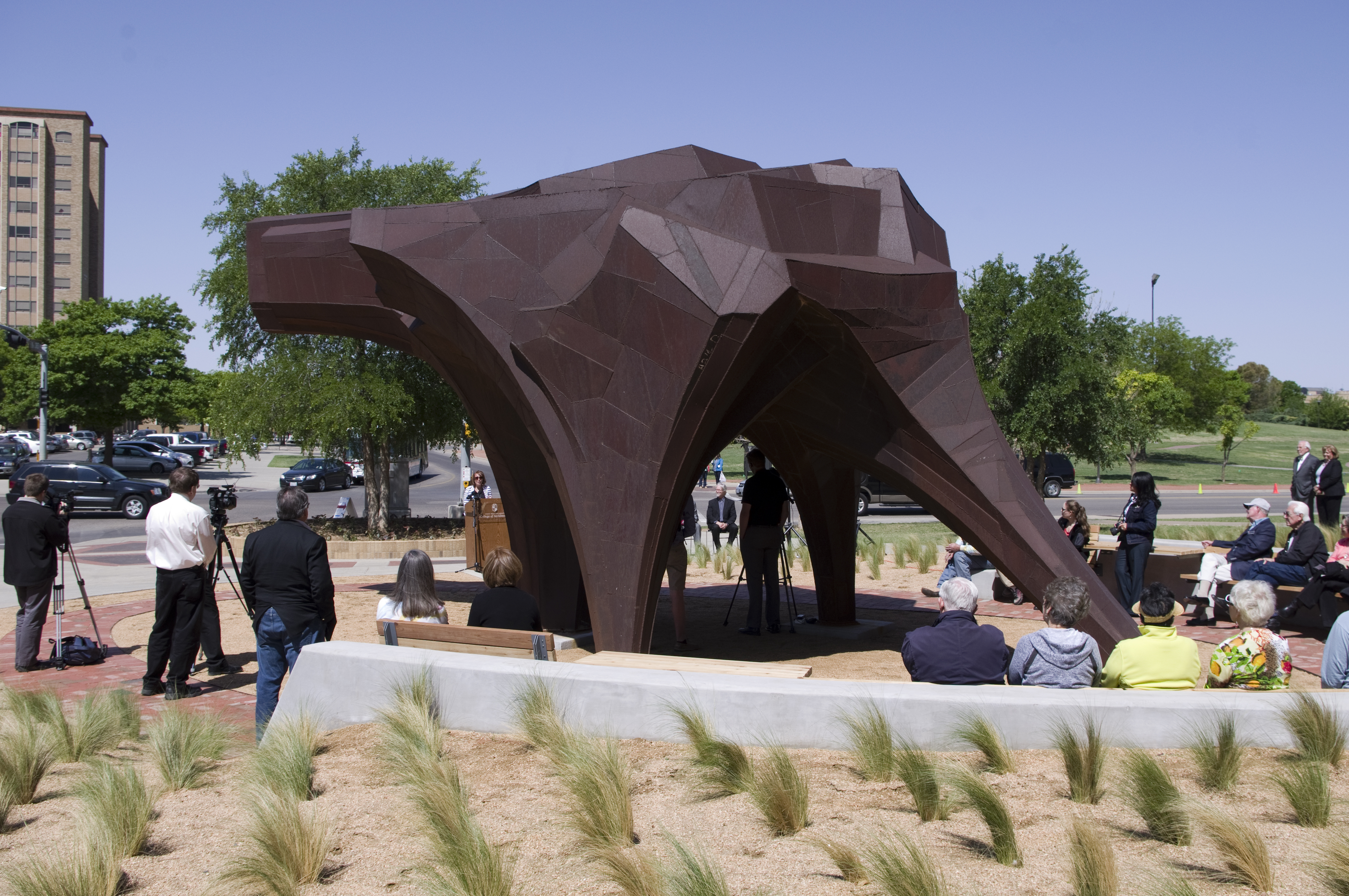
Dedication of the Robert Bruno Sculpture and Plaza at Texas Tech University, April 20, 2015

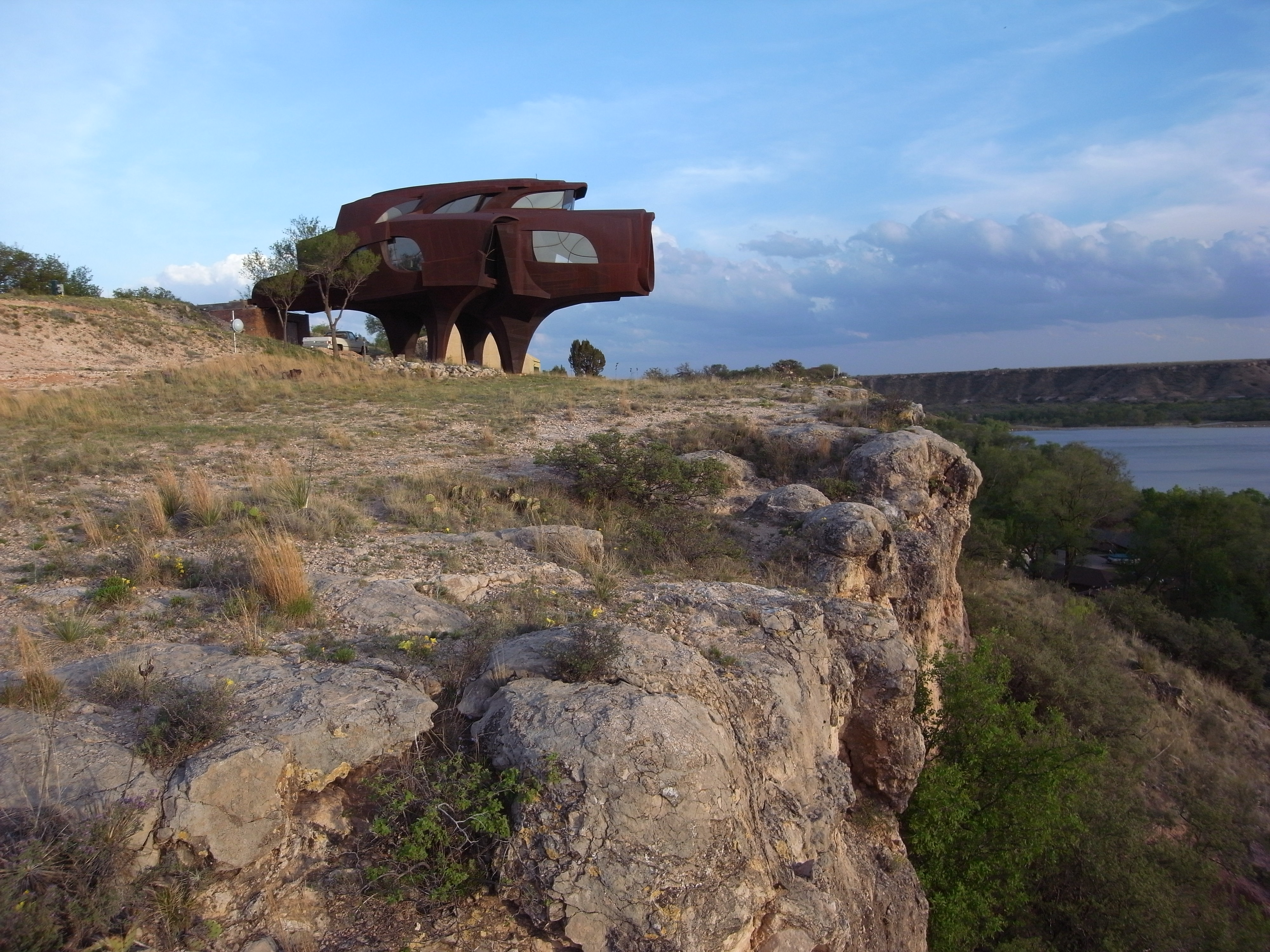
Robert Bruno's Steel House overlooking the rim at Ransom Canyon

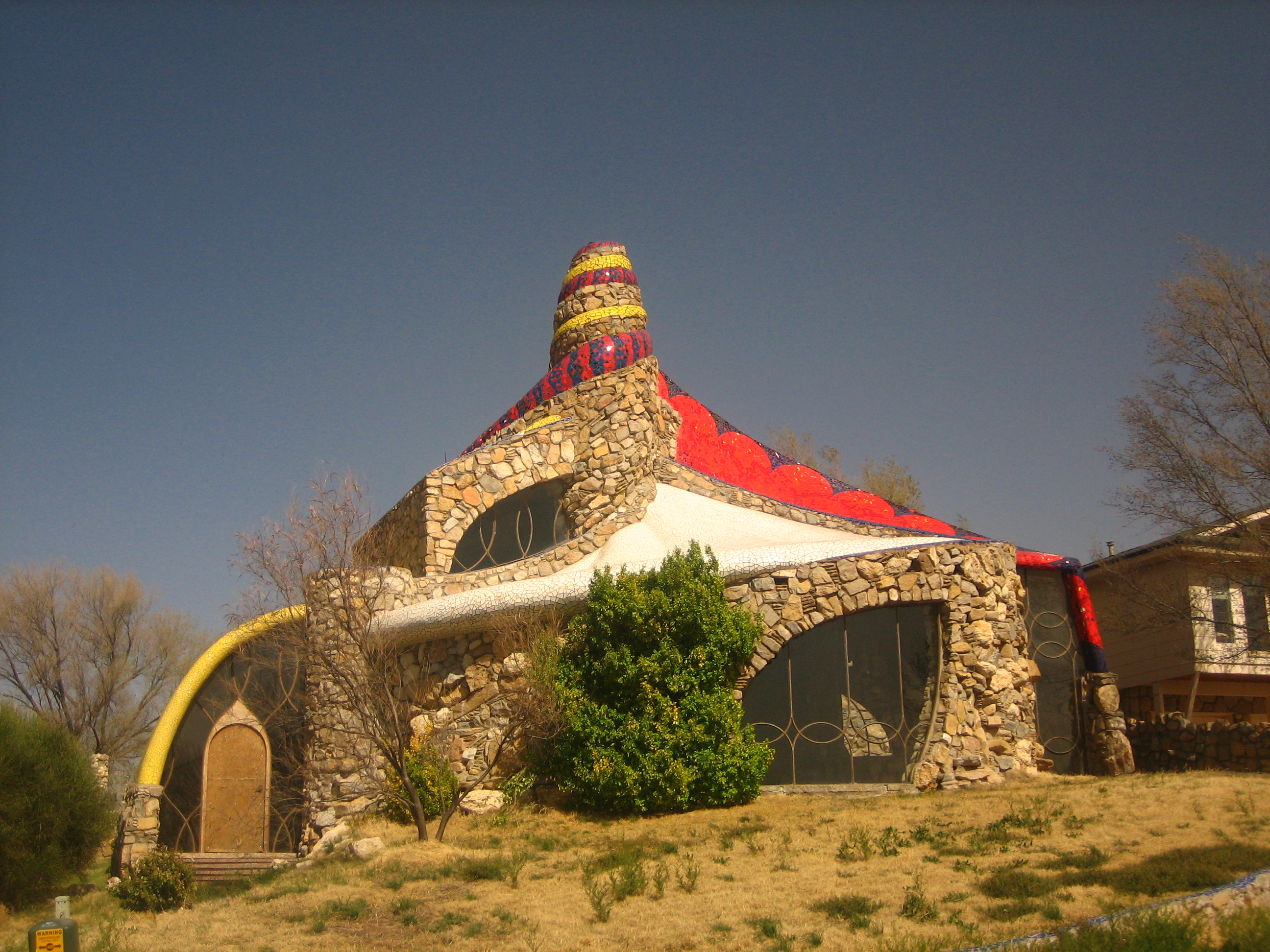
The Lawson Rock House in Ransom Canyon
