= George N. Gillett Jr. =

American businessman (1938–2026)

Chairman, Liverpool Football Club
- In office February 6, 2007 – October 15, 2010 Serving with Tom Hicks
- Preceded by: Moores family
- Succeeded by: John W. Henry

Personal details
- Born: George Nield Gillett Jr. October 22, 1938 Eau Claire, Wisconsin, U.S.
- Died: September 22, 2026 (aged 87) Denver, Colorado, U.S.
- Education: Amherst College; Dominican College of Racine
- Profession: Businessman

George Nield Gillett Jr. (October 22, 1938 – September 22, 2026) was an American businessman. Originally from Wisconsin, he lived in Vail, Colorado.

== Early life and career ==
Gillett graduated from Lake Forest Academy in 1956. He attended Amherst College and was a 1961 graduate of Dominican College of Racine, Wisconsin. Gillett's first job following college was with Crown Zellerbach as a regional sales manager.

His career continued in the 1960s in marketing and management consulting, initially with McKinsey & Co. A sports fanatic since childhood, by 1966, he was business manager and partner of the Miami Dolphins. In 1966, he purchased a 20% interest in the Miami Dolphins NFL franchise for $1 million. He sold this interest in 1968 for $3 million, and used some of the proceeds to purchase the nearly defunct Harlem Globetrotters and later started Globetrotters Communications, a nationally syndicated radio group. He reinvigorated the Globetrotters by an intense marketing effort that included a popular cartoon series.

In 1978, Gillett bought Packerland Packing Co. With the successful venture of Packerland, Gillett then diversified into radio and television with the start of Gillett Communications Company. At its peak, Gillett Communications owned network affiliates, the majority of which were CBS, in many of the country's major television markets.

In 1979, he launched Gillett Communications by buying three small television stations. Three years later he bought WSM-TV in Nashville, renamed WSMV. In 1984, Gillett acquired Appleton-based Post Corporation's eight television stations, 22 newspapers and associated plants; the non-broadcast assets were sold to Thomson Corporation and other buyers. In 1986, he bought out the two A.S. Abell stations as part of a spin-off resulting from the acquisition of A.S. Abell by Times Mirror Company.

In 1985, Gillett acquired Vail Associates' Vail and Beaver Creek ski resorts. He would often ride chairlifts and greet guests, and launched a massive installation of high-speed detachable chairlifts. Gillett also supported major alpine ski events at a time when most ski areas in the United States declined to host international races, starting with the 1989 World Alpine Ski Championships, and through his support hosted the 1999 World Alpine Ski Championships.

Gillett acquired majority control of the television assets of Storer Communications in April 1987 from the investment firm Kohlberg Kravis Roberts, and represented a valuation of nearly 15 times cash flow for the group. KKR maintained 45-percent minority ownership. To meet regulatory approval, Gillett's existing station group was spun off to Busse Broadcasting, a company formed by Gillett employees. Gillett's purchase was financed by junk bonds through KKR raised prior to Black Monday, which quickly placed Gillett in a 10:1 debt-to-profit ratio. Rumors began circulating of Gillett selling off one or several of his stations, while Gillett was reportedly interested in buying the Seattle Seahawks. One of the Storer stations, WJW-TV, was frequently the subject of sale rumors due to their ratings strength and stability.

WSMV was sold off in early 1989, leading Gillett to boast it shored up his company's finances but the firm missed an October 1989 loan payment, prompting three creditors to ask the United States Bankruptcy Court in Delaware that SCI Television be placed in involuntary Chapter 7 bankruptcy while SCI offered a debt for equity exchange. This exchange offer was agreed to within hours of a deadline placed by the Delaware court. Bondholders acquired a 39-percent stake in SCI, while Gillett saw his ownership reduced to 41 percent and KKR's reduced to 15 percent; KKR also cancelled a $190 million debit note held on SCI. Gillett failed to meet a debt payment by August 1990, prompting S&P Global Ratings to lower the rating for Gillett Holdings from a C to a D. Gillett tried to sell his Baltimore station, WMAR-TV to Dillon, Read & Co.; while that sale attempt failed, a second attempt to Scripps-Howard proved successful.

Gillett's financial pressures continued to mount after the WMAR sale was renegotiated to a lower price and a Denver bankruptcy judge denied any further extensions on a Chapter 11 filing. The early 1990s recession also negatively impacted television station cash flow and advertising revenue, on top of Gillett's failure to divest assets prior to a decline in station valuation. Facing lawsuits from multiple creditors including Apollo Partners, Allstate and Fidelity Investments, Gillett Holdings filed for Chapter 11 on July 26, 1991. After reaching another agreement with bondholders, Gillett Holdings was restructured in January 1992, with Gillett as a minority owner but maintaining day-to-day operational control.

Investor Ronald Perelman, regarded as a corporate raider and the owner of Revlon and Marvel Entertainment, purchased majority control of SCI Television on February 17, 1993, pushing Gillett out entirely. The transaction came through a bankruptcy court-approved Chapter 11 reorganization: Perelman's holding company MacAndrews & Forbes made a $100 million investment in SCI, which was still burdened by $1.3 billion in debt, in exchange for 53 percent of its equity. WTVT, Gillett's station in Tampa, Florida, was also included. After the deal closed, SCI was folded into Perelman's New World Entertainment and renamed New World Communications.

== After junk bonds ==
Gillett walked away with $32.1 million to restart his business empire when Vail floated on the NYSE. In 1995, he repurchased Packerland undertaken by Booth Creek Management Corp., a company created to oversee the acquisitions and management of interests of the Gillett family from that point forwards, and of which Gillett remained chairman.

In 1996, he formed Booth Creek Ski Holdings Inc., acquiring or building a range of ski resorts in New Hampshire, California, Washington and Wyoming. He later bought Grand Targhee Ski and Summer Resort, together with several golf courses. Booth Creek continues to operate Sierra-at-Tahoe.

From 1997, he extended his meat interests by building Corporate Brand Foods America (which included ITC, Iowa Ham, Jordan Meats and Wright Bacon). Iowa Beef Processors (IBP) purchased the company for US$584 million in stock and assumed debt in 1999.

Gillett and Hicks, Muse, Tate & Furst then bought ConAgra's beef operations—Swift & Company—for US$1.4 billion in 2000. On July 12, 2007, JBS S.A., the largest beef processor in South America and one of the largest worldwide beef exporters, purchased Swift & Company in a US$1.5 billion all-cash deal. The acquisition made the newly consolidated JBS Swift Group the largest beef processor in the world.

In the meat business, Gillett also controlled:

- Petaluma Poultry – natural and organic chicken products
- Snowball Foods – food processor of turkey and chicken products
- Kings Delight – food processor of turkey and chicken products
- B3R Country Meats – processes fresh and frozen natural beef
- Coleman Natural Products – processes fresh and frozen natural pork products and lamb
- Gerhard's Napa Valley Sausage – a producer of gourmet sausage products made primarily from poultry.

== North American sports interests ==
In 2000, Gillett joined forces with Pat Bowlen and John Elway in a failed attempt to buy the Denver Nuggets of the NBA, Colorado Avalanche of the NHL, and Pepsi Center. On January 2, 2001, Gillett bought an 80% interest in the Montreal Canadiens and their home arena, Molson Centre, for US$185 million. Prior to that purchase, Gillett had shown interest in the Florida Panthers, New York Islanders, Ottawa Senators, and the Phoenix Coyotes. Gillett's bid initially raised fears that he might move the NHL's oldest franchise to the United States. However, after no other viable offers surfaced from Canadian interests, Molson agreed to Gillett's offer. Molson, however, maintained the right of first refusal should Gillett ever sell the team.

On August 6, 2007, Gillett bought a controlling interest of the NASCAR team Evernham Motorsports from founder Ray Evernham, thereby forming Gillett Evernham Motorsports. In January 2009, a merger was completed with fellow NASCAR team Petty Enterprises. As a result, GEM was renamed Richard Petty Motorsports. Gillett sold his share in the team after the 2010 season.

On March 27, 2008, Joey Saputo, chairman of USL First Division team Montreal Impact, confirmed talks with Gillett and Major League Soccer for a Montreal franchise. While a bid for a franchise was launched with Saputo and Gillett co-heading the venture, as a result of finances, however, the group would rescind the bid later that year on November 22.

On June 20, 2009, the Montreal Canadiens confirmed that Gillett had sold the team, along with the Bell Centre and the Gillett Entertainment Group, a Canadian-based sports and entertainment promoter, to the Molson brothers for a reported $550 million (Cdn). The deal was concluded on December 1, 2009.

== Liverpool F.C. ==
From October 2006, Gillett and fellow American Tom Hicks had been parties interested in a proposed takeover of Liverpool F.C. of the Premier League. In January 2007, Reports stated that Gillett had made another bid for Liverpool. On January 31, 2007, Dubai International Capital announced they had pulled out of the deal, giving Gillett the opportunity to buy the club from David Moores. On February 2, 2007, Gillett and Hicks reached a deal with the club's board, which was sealed on February 6, thought to be worth in the region of £435 million: £220 million to buy out existing shareholders (including approximately £44.8 million of debt), and £215 million for the new stadium proposed at nearby Stanley Park. The Board unanimously recommended that the club's shareholders accept this offer.

On January 22, 2008, a majority of Liverpool fans, at the game between Liverpool and Aston Villa, protested against Gillett and Hicks's running of the club, urging the pair to sell their shares in Liverpool F.C. to Dubai International Capital (DIC). Neither owner, nor their representative Foster Gillett were present at the game. Gillett was reportedly targeted by DIC to sell his shares. It was reported that he had fallen out with Tom Hicks and in the recent months kept silent over his dealing with the club. On March 7, 2008, it was reported that Gillett had agreed to sell 98 per cent of his Liverpool stock to DIC, but Hicks blocked the sale. In an interview on Prime Time Sports in Canada, Gillett revealed that he and his family had received death threats from angry Liverpool fans: "The fans don't want him [Tom Hicks] to have even one share of my stake in the club, based on what they are sending to me. As a result of that we [my family] have received many phone calls in the middle of the night threatening our lives, death threats. A number came to the office and my son, Foster, and daughter-in-law, Lauren, have received them." The relationship between Gillett and Hicks broke down some time prior to this, wh8ch led to the in-fighting at Anfield.

Sky Sports' website reported that former manager Rafael Benítez's relationship with Hicks and Gillett had become increasingly strained and he was fired on June 2, 2010, after a poor season which saw the club finish seventh in the Premier League, missing out on UEFA Champions League football for the following season.

As of October 15, 2010, Gillett had lost ownership of Liverpool F.C., and despite numerous attempts to prevent it, the club was sold to New England Sports Ventures (NESV), for a fee believed to be around £300 million which was far below his valuation of "between £600M and £1 billion (B)", by the Liverpool F.C. board of directors in a 3–2 vote.

As of November 2010, Gillett was personally named in a lawsuit filed by Mill Financial, seeking $117 million. Mill Financial, based in Springfield, Virginia, reportedly refinanced a loan used by Gillett to buy a big stake in Liverpool F.C. in 2007. Gillett's partner in the deal was Tom Hicks. Gillett and Hicks, dba Gillett Football LLC, lost control of Liverpool F.C. after they were unable to stop the Royal Bank of Scotland, which financed their original purchase of the team, from selling Liverpool F.C. The bank sold Liverpool F.C. to Boston Red Sox owner John W. Henry's New England Sports Ventures at a price that was lower than expected. At the same time the Liverpool issue was occurring, Gillett's Richard Petty Motorsports fell into financial trouble.

On January 11, 2013, Hicks and Gillett finally decided to drop their case in the English law courts against Sir Martin Broughton, Christian Purslow and Ian Ayre, the three directors on the board of Liverpool F.C. at the time of the sale of the club to NESV. They also agreed to drop their case against NESV and the Royal Bank of Scotland. The terms of the agreement are confidential, though it is believed that no monies were paid to Hicks or Gillett. Earlier in the week, Hicks and Gillett had lost a Court of Appeal bid to delay a High Court trial, so they could have more time to raise the monies needed to fund the multimillion-pound lawsuit.

As of 2016, Gillett was still paying £1.5 million per year in interest payments to Mill Financial, who lent him £50 million for his failed investment in Liverpool.

== Other interests ==
Other Gillett business interests included:

- Northland Services Inc. – a marine transportation company
- Great Northern Bark and Sierra Organics – landscaping and gardening products company
- Summit Automotive Partners, an auto dealership group

== Death ==
George Gillett died on September 22, 2026, at the age of 87.
