= Albert Racine =

Blackfeet artist (1907–1984)

Albert Batiste Racine
- Apowmuckon
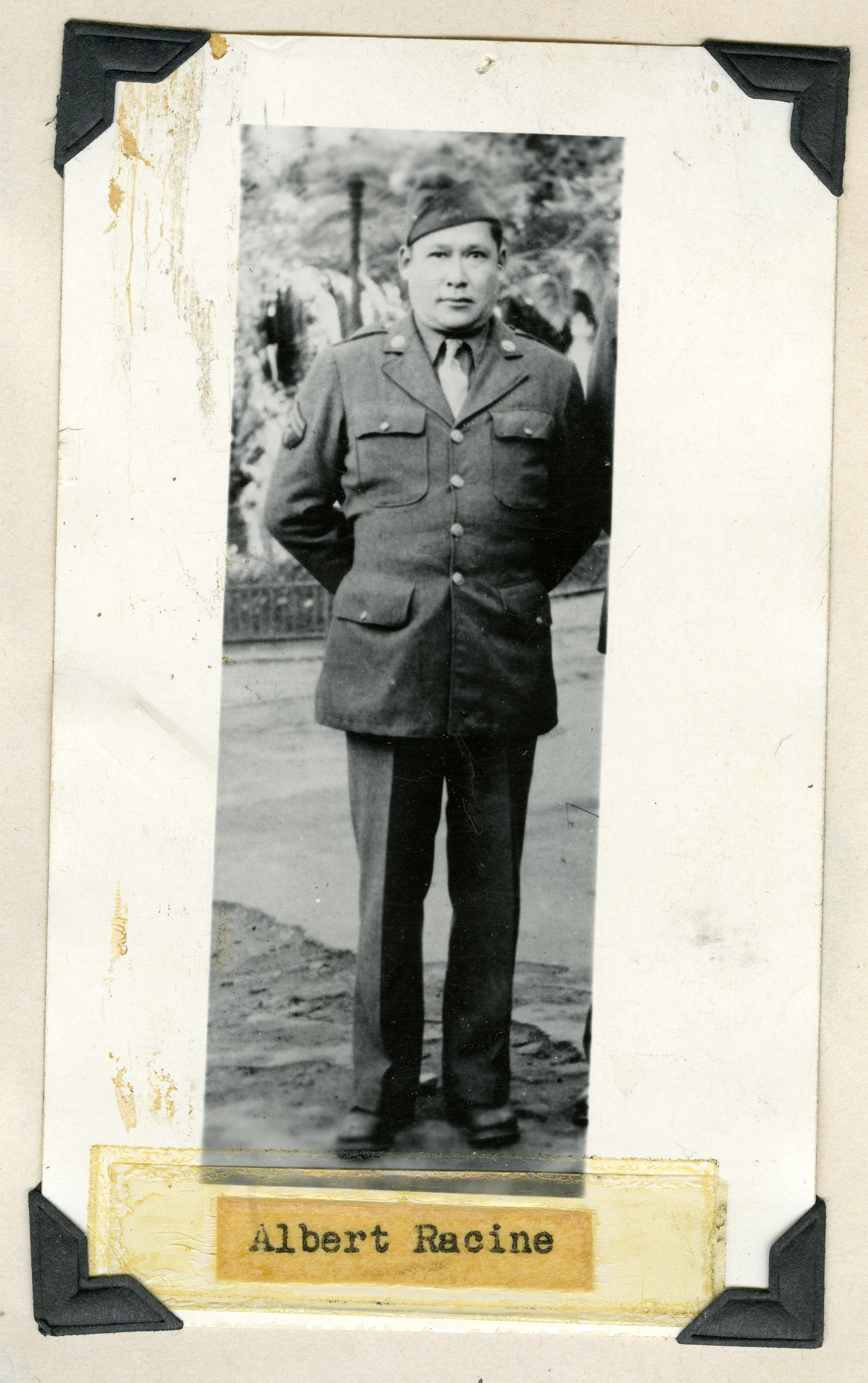
- Albert Racine in uniform during WWII
- Born: April 19, 1907; Browning, Montana, U.S.
- Died: 1984 (aged 76–77)
- Other names: Running Weasel
- Citizenship: Blackfeet Tribe, United States
- Known for: relief carving, sketching

Albert Batiste Racine, also known as Apowmuckon, or Running Weasel (April 19, 1907 – 1984) was a Blackfeet artist from Browning, Montana in the United States. He started his career as a painter, and by 1936 he was a sculptor. He is noted for his relief wood carvings depicting the life and culture of the Blackfeet.

== Biography ==
Racine was born in Browning, Montana, attending Browning Public Schools and the Haskell Institute in Lawrence, Kansas. Racine studied under German artist Winold Reiss at his summer school at Saint Mary's Lake, Montana. He also studied art under sculptors Adrien Voisin and John Louis Clarke; and was a student of Edward Everett Hale Jr., and Carl Hertig Sr.

Racine first exhibited his work in 1927 and in 1938 created a carving of da Vinci's The Last Supper for the Browning Methodist Church, beginning his career as a wood carver. Racine joined the United States Army in 1942 and served throughout World War II. As a student at Browning Public Schools, Racine developed an interest in the Blackfeet folk hero Napi, who featured in short plays staged at the high school. Racine created a signature sketch of Napi, whom he envisioned as a skinny figure with a potbelly, large hat, and mischievous smile. According to museum curator John C. Ewers, Napi was an amalgam of two well-known older Indians. During the war, Racine was deployed in North Africa and sent sketches of Napi in uniform back home to Montana. Variations of this sketch were featured on commercial signs in Browning as well as in his carvings and sketches.

For a few years, Racine operated the Blackfeet Indian and Western Art Gallery in Browning where he sold leatherwork and beadwork by local craftsmen alongside his own sculptures, carvings, and paintings. His work has also been displayed at Browning's Museum of the Plains Indian, operated by the Indian Arts and Crafts Board.
