= St. John's School for the Deaf =

Catholic school in Wisconsin, U.S.

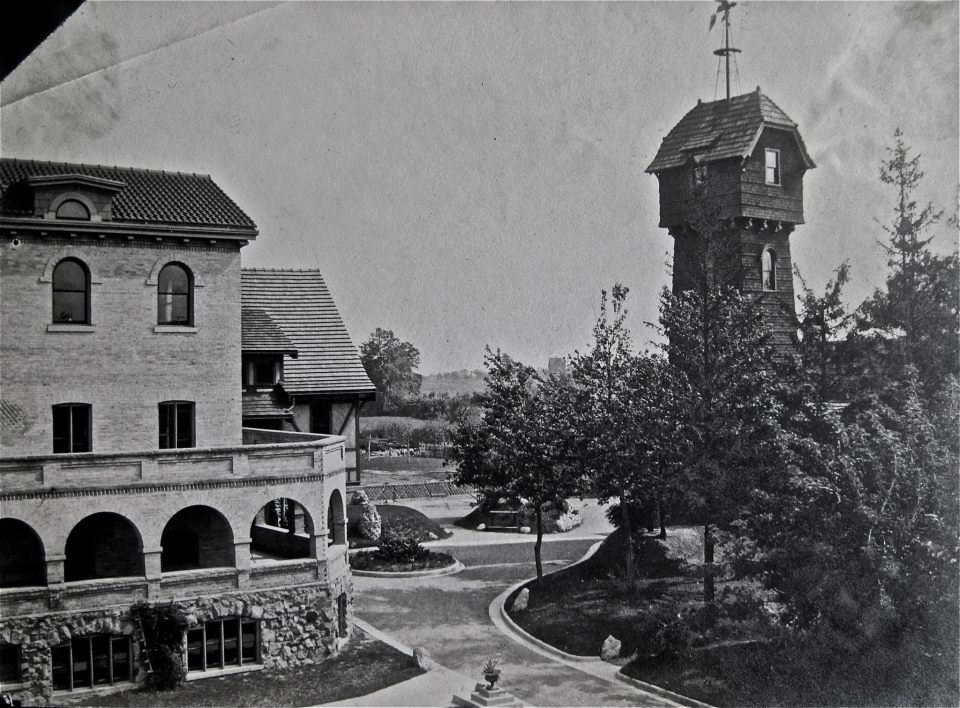

Location
- 3680 South Kinnickinnic Ave. St. Francis, Wisconsin 53235; United States

Information
- Type: Coeducational, boarding
- Religious affiliations: Roman Catholic, Sisters of St. Francis of Assisi
- Patron saint: St. John
- Established: 10 May 1876
- Status: Defunct
- Closed: May 1983
- Sister school: St. Rita School for the Deaf
- Oversight: Archdiocese of Milwaukee
- Director: Donald Zerkel (1983)
- Principal: Sr. Roberta Le Pine, OSF (1983)
- Faculty: 22 (1976)
- Grades: PreK-12
- Enrolment: 100 (1983)
- Language: American Sign Language
- Colors: Blue and green
- Athletics conference: Central States Schools for the Deaf
- Sports: Cheerleading, baseball, basketball, swimming
- Team name: Eagles
- Yearbook: Green Spirit
- School fees: $8,000 (1982-1983)

St. John's School for the Deaf was a Roman Catholic school for deaf children located in St. Francis, Wisconsin. Founded in 1876, the school served children from preschool through twelfth grade before closing in 1983. St. John became most famous for being the site of possibly upwards of 200 molestations at the hands of priest and serial child molester Lawrence C. Murphy who was on staff from 1950 until 1974.

== History ==
=== Catholic Deaf and Dumb Asylum (1876–1889) ===
On 10 May 1876, Theodore Bruener, Rector of the Catholic Normal School and Pio Nono College, a music-oriented teaching institution in St. Francis, established the Catholic Deaf and Dumb Asylum. It served 17 pupils in its first school year, with classes being held in the second floor of the Pio Nono gymnasium. Seeing remarkable growth, Bruener set out fundraising in order to construct a separate building for the school. Construction of the new structure was completed in the summer of 1879 and dedicated in December of that year. The finished building was a three-story, cream brick Italianate structure, surrounded by acres of forest, farmland and ornamental gardens. It could accommodate 60 students.

=== St. John's Institute for Deaf Mutes (1889–1938) ===
On 29 December 1879, Bruener was assigned elsewhere, and John Fiedl succeeded him for roughly a year. He was replaced by Charles Fessler, who led the school for nine years during a difficult period of financial stress and seemingly inevitable closure. On 15 August 1889, Matthias M. Gerend became St. John's fourth Director, and immediately set out to stabilize the school's finances. He changed the name to St. John's Institute for Deaf Mutes, and requested from Archbishop Michael Heiss permission and funding to construct workshops adjacent to the school in which students could produce altars, confessionals, baptismal fonts, statues, pulpits, cabinets and carvings. The archbishop approved this, and the workshops were finished in February 1890. The production of church furnishings soon proved hugely profitable, earning over $20,000 in the first year ($509,630 in 2015 dollars). The Sisters of St. Francis of Assisi, who staffed St. John's throughout its operation, still hold pews from the workshops in the chapel of their motherhouse in St. Francis. During that time, St. John's had three departments: School, Industrial and Domestic. The School Department taught students in the classics. The boys were taught by a lay teacher, Professor L.W. Mihm, and the girls taught by the Franciscan Sisters. The Industrial Department included all sorts of trades, most famous for its church furnishings. The department included only boys and was taught by E. Brielmaier, an architect and altar-builder who was famous in the region at the time. The Domestic Department was for girls only. The Sisters of St. Francis of Assisi taught them cooking, sewing and other housekeeping skills.

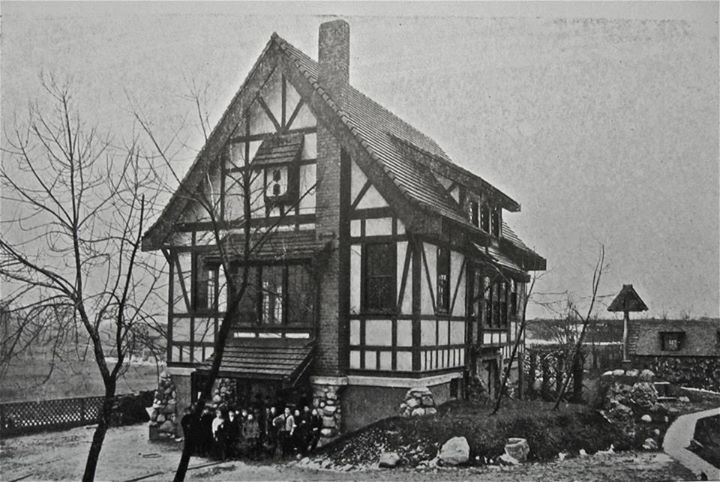
The Old Gym in the 1910s. The building was demolished in 1967.

In 1893, Gerend had a chapel constructed dedicated to Archbishop Heiss, who had left his entire estate to St. John's. Also constructed in the late 19th century was a Tudor-style gymnasium, later known as the Old Gym. Gerend, who was Swiss, had the building constructed using student labor to resemble the architecture of his home country, according to alumni. The gym was an early home to the school's basketball teams, held a classroom in its basement, and hosted movie showings on Saturday nights, according to alumni.

In 1895, St. John's Institute for Deaf Mutes became a fully independent school, and was no longer an entity within Pio Nono College.

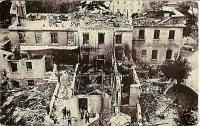
Fire damage of the main building in 1907

On July 31, 1907, the original St. John's Institute building was partially destroyed by a fire that broke out in the roof of the building. The fire was caused by a gas chandelier in the chapel. Luckily, only two Sisters and ten female students were in the building at the time, and were able to easily exit the building before the flames reached the lower floors. By the time the Milwaukee Fire Department put out the fire, the entire south wing of the building was destroyed, and the west wing was damaged, causing $35,000 in damage. As recorded in a Racine Daily Journal article from a day after the fire, Steven Klopper, the assistant director, commented on the lack of casualties of the fire:

We were lucky in having the fire occur as it did. Usually there are about seventy-five children in the institute. During the summer, most of them are away on vacations, and there are only about twenty boys and ten girls here now. The younger children had been dismissed for the day. Only a few of the larger girls were in the building when the fire started. Had it originated during school hours or at night, when the dormitories are filled, there might have been a serious loss of life.

The insurance covered all but $10,000 of the damage, and donations from charities and members of the public covered the rest of the loss, allowing St. John's to speedily erect a replacement school building.

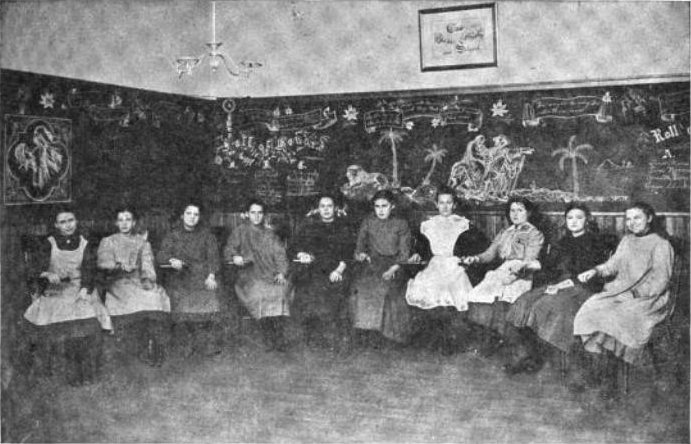
A girls' catechism class in 1920, originally published in Our Young People, a magazine for deaf youth published at St. John's

=== St. John School for the Deaf (1938–1983) ===
In 1938, Gerend, by then raised to the rank of monsignor, died, leaving St. John's with a new chapel, workshops, stable finances, and a faculty of eleven Sisters, multiple lay teachers and two assistant directors, Steven Klopper and Eugene J. Gelh. Gelh was promoted to Director following Gerend's death, and renamed the school St. John School for the Deaf. He continued the publication of Our Young People for a few years, but he became known mostly for his organization of retreats and missions. He also continued Gerend's work of stabilizing school finances. On 10 May 1963, after 54 years of service (including his entire priesthood) to St. John's and 27 years as director, Gehl died.

Following Gehl's death, Lawrence C. Murphy was appointed director, after serving 13 years as assistant director and the director of athletics. Murphy addressed in his tenure St. John's two pressing issues: the aging facilities and deaf education technology and the lack of a high school. He felt that he could address both issues at the same time by demolishing the old buildings and constructing new, larger ones that would have sufficient facilities to serve high school students.

Murphy commissioned plans for a new high school department that would contain a classroom and dormitory block and an adjacent athletic center containing a gym, swimming pool, theater, teen center and playroom. He presented them to Archbishop William Edward Cousins, who endorsed Murphy's efforts and provided archdiocesan funding for the project. That money as well as funding from the Knights of Columbus and the Christ Child Society provided all the school needed to proceed with construction. The new classroom building, built of red brick in a modern design, was completed just in time for the 1967–1968 school year. The old buildings, including the Old Gym, were demolished in June 1967. The athletic facilities were completed in 1973. The entire seven-year project cost $3 million.

In 1974, Murphy resigned because of "ill health", according to the Archdiocese of Milwaukee at the time. In reality, after years of sexual abuse of possibly near 200 pupils of St. John's, former victims had begun to step forward and report Murphy to Milwaukee and St. Francis police, the Milwaukee District Attorney and the Archdiocese. He was sent to live in his mother's house in the Diocese of Superior, and was never held accountable for his crimes, despite an ecclesiastical trial that was ended due to Murphy's poor health later in life.

After Murphy's resignation, the school switched to a dual-leadership system. The position of principal was created to oversee academic affairs, and the director position was now controlled the facilities, finances and other nonacademic affairs. Donald Zerkel, who had been the assistant director, became the director, and Sr. Roberta Le Pine, OSF, a faculty member, became the school's first principal. By 1976, St. John's had 113 students ranging in grade from preschool to twelfth grade, down from 158 in 1971. There were 22 faculty members, including nine Franciscan Sisters, 12 laypersons and Zerkel.

On 10 February 1982, Archbishop Rembert G. Weakland announced St. John School for the Deaf would close in May 1983 in a letter to parents of students. He cited the "ever-increasing expenses of the program" as the deciding factor in the decision. That year alone, the school was operating on a $300,000+ deficit, and would require more than $1 million to remain open for the next two years. In the 1980–1981 school year, the archdiocese contributed $250,000 to the school, compared to $450,000 for the 1982–1983 school year. In his letter, Archbishop Weakland wrote:

The excellence of the program at St. John's is unquestioned. However, the burden of continuing to support the program can no longer be borne by the Archdiocese of Milwaukee through the resources available to it.

The archbishop wrote that a decline in enrollment had taken a severe toll on the school's ability to pay its bills. He noted that medical advances and decreasing American birthrates had caused a decrease in the deaf and hearing-impaired population, as well as growing popularity among parents in mainstreaming deaf children.

For the last school year, there were 100 students in a school built to accommodate 225, 80 of them boarders.

Following its closure, the former school facilities became the St. John Center, a multi-use Roman Catholic center and home to the Archdiocese of Milwaukee's deaf ministry, which was led by William Key, a sign language–fluent priest.

== Sex abuse scandal ==
Lawrence Murphy taught at St. John from 1950 to 1974. He is believed to have molested up to 200 deaf boys before the mid-1970s. Local law enforcement agencies, including the Milwaukee Police Department, the St. Francis Police Department, and the Milwaukee County District Attorney were informed of the abuse in 1974 by adult graduates of the St. John, but expressed doubts about the credibility of the allegations and the statute of limitations, and did nothing.

Milwaukee Archbishop William Edward Cousins gave Murphy a leave of absence in 1974 and allowed him to move to his mother's house in Boulder Junction, Wisconsin, which is in the Diocese of Superior. Cousins did not tell the Bishop of Superior the reason Murphy was not living in Milwaukee.

In 1977, Rembert Weakland succeeded Cousins as Archbishop of Milwaukee. Weakland stated in a 2008 deposition, that he was aware of the accusations against Murphy in 1977, and prohibited him from saying Mass in Milwaukee, but otherwise did nothing, and gave no information about Murphy to the Diocese of Superior where Murphy was living. Weakland offered to transfer Murphy to the Diocese of Superior, but the offer was not accepted, and Murphy finally retired as a priest of the Archdiocese of Milwaukee in January 1993.

In December 1993, Weakland had Murphy evaluated by a psychotherapist. During the interview, Murphy admitted molesting boys at least up until 1974, including during the sacrament of penance, which is an offense under canon law. In July 1996, Weakland notified the Congregation for the Doctrine of the Faith and asked how to proceed. Although the Congregation for the Doctrine of the Faith at the time did not have jurisdiction over most incidents involving sexual abuse by priests, it did have authority over cases involving solicitation by priests during the sacrament of penance. Weakland stated that "[I] got an answer back saying yes. We could open the case", and the process against Murphy was begun in October 1996. Cardinal Tarcisio Bertone instructed Wisconsin bishops to convene a canonical trial, which could have resulted in a range of punishments, including laicization. A formal church trial was initiated but later dropped because Archbishop Weakland decided that a pastoral solution was more appropriate because Murphy was elderly and in poor health. Murphy had a massive stroke while gambling at a casino and died several months after he requested that the Vatican halt a canonical trial against him because of his ill health.

The Vatican responded to concerns by noting that they had not been informed of the allegations until 20 years after they were first raised; that Murphy died within two years of Vatican notification of the allegations; that police investigations into the allegations at the time did not result in any cases being heard; and that there was nothing in the Vatican's actions that would prevent civil cases from proceeding.

As of March 2010, there were four outstanding lawsuits against the Archdiocese of Milwaukee in the case.

== Publications ==
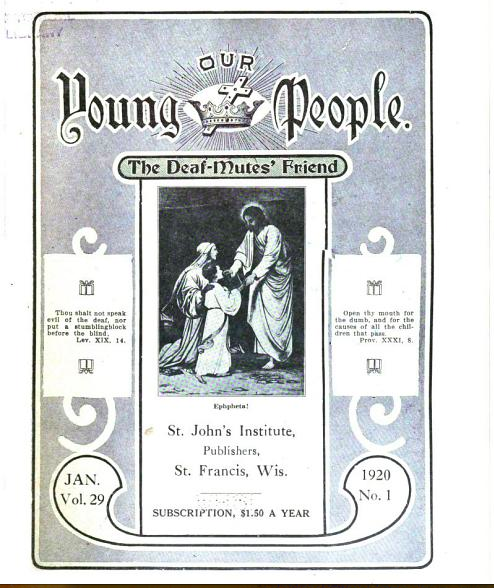
A January 1920 issue of Our Young People

The St. John's Institute for Deaf Mutes, under the direction of Matthias M. Gerend, began publishing a monthly magazine for deaf youth called Our Young People, which was published with the slogan, The Deaf-Mute's Friend. Its logo was a sun with a detailed crown in front of it, with a cross intersecting diagonally through the crown. It contained poems, personal accounts, short stories, and other articles relating to deafness, all with a Roman Catholic theme. It was produced from the around the turn of the twentieth century until the mid-1940s.

Gerend also published books for the financial benefit of the St. John's. Most of these books were sign language educational books, but another was In and about St. Francis: A Souvenir, a book discussing sightseeing in St. Francis, Wisconsin.

The St. John's Newsletter, quad-yearly publication featuring school news, was created and edited for many years by Lawrence C. Murphy.

The St. John School for the Deaf yearbook was known as the Green Spirit, and was published until the school's closing in 1983.

== Enrollment ==
Year	Enrollment	Faculty	
Year	Enrollment	Religious	Lay
1876	17	1	1
1877	-	2	2
1907	75	-	-
1949	82	-	-
1961	100	21	0
1968	161	11	-
1971	158	-	-
1976	113	10	12
1982	100		

== List of directors ==
Directors

1. Theodore Bruener (1876–1879)
2. John Friedl (1879–1880)
3. Charles Fessler (1880–1889)
4. Mattias M. Gerend (1889–1938)
5. Eugene J. Gehl (1938–1963)
6. Lawrence C. Murphy (1963–1974)
7. Donald Zerkel (1974–1983)

Principal

1. Roberta Le Pine, OSF (1974–1983)

== Notable alumni ==
- John Louis Clarke, Blackfoot wood carver

== Gallery ==
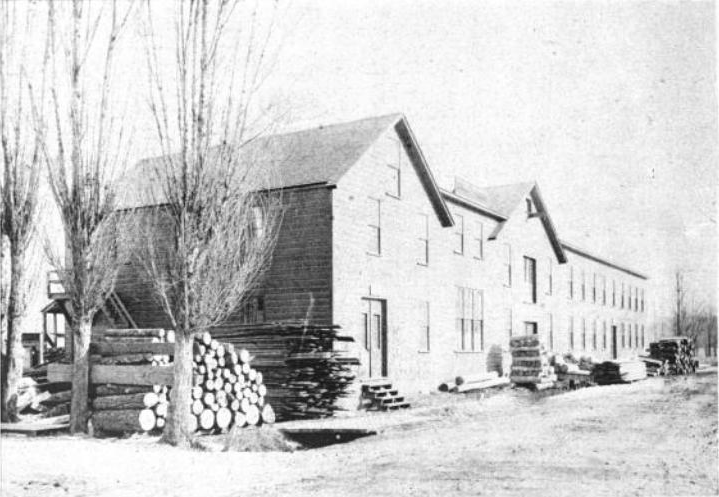

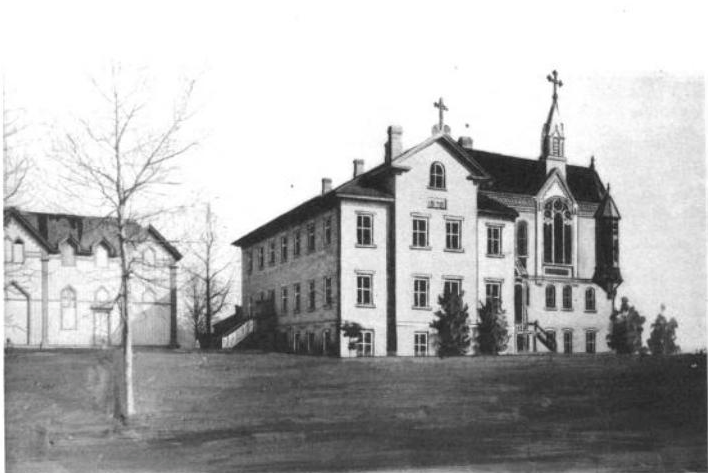

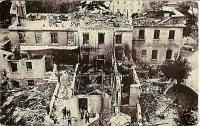

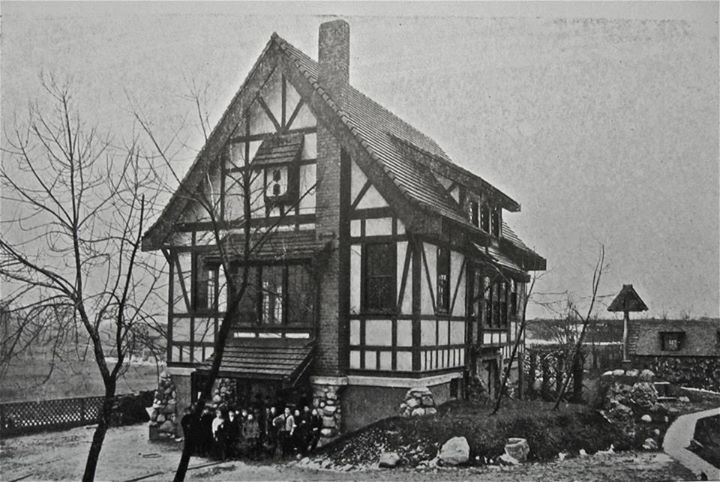

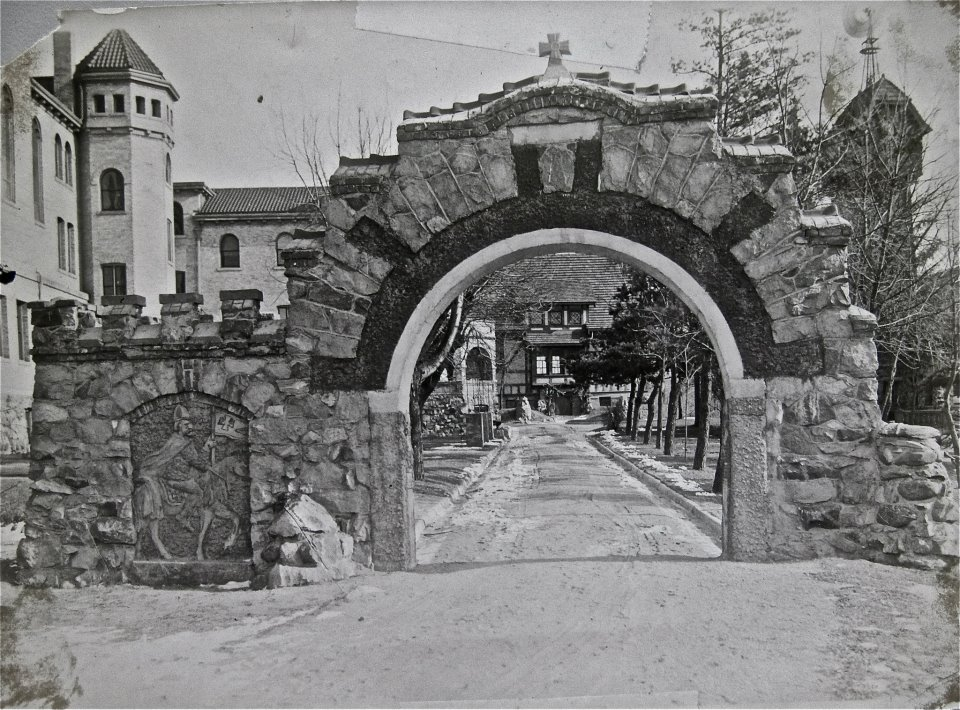

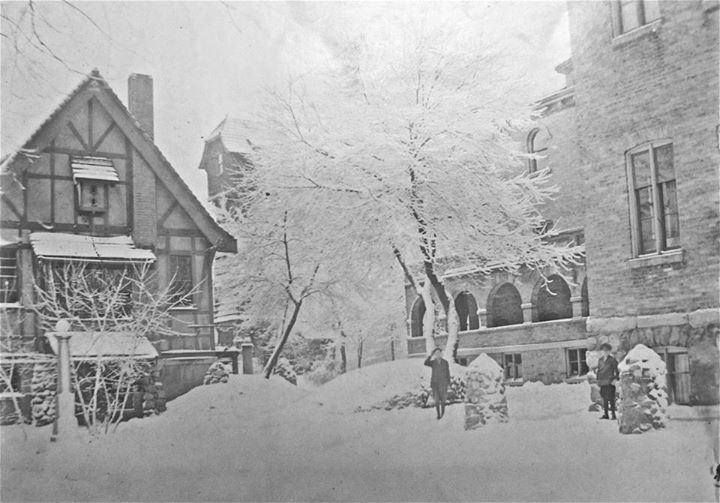

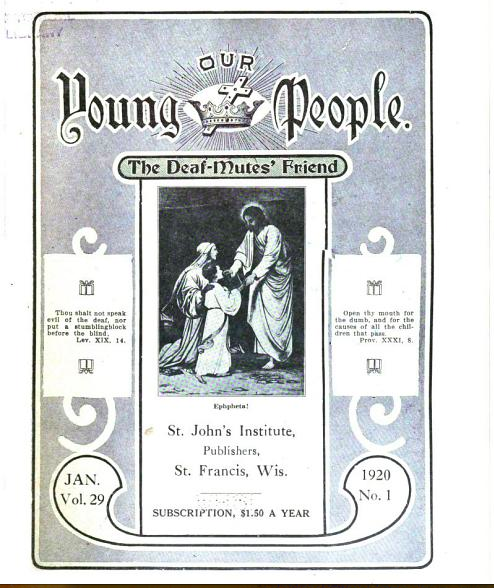

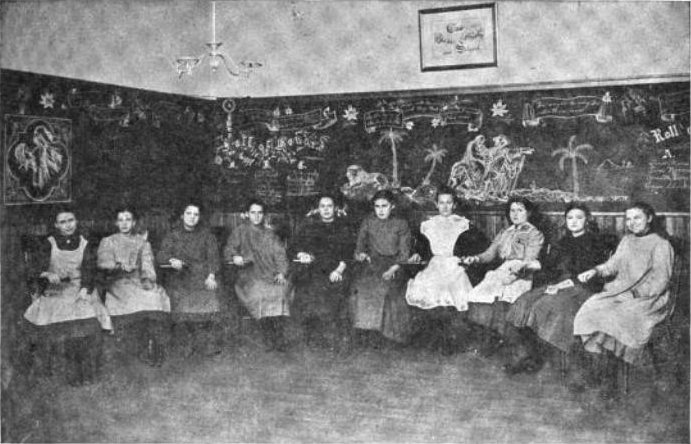

== In film and television ==
Christopher Hitchens and Bill Donohue discussed and debated the sexual abuse scandal at St. John's School for the Deaf in a March 2010 appearance on Fox News Channel.

The 2012 documentary film Mea Maxima Culpa: Silence in the House of God directed by Alex Gibney follows the story of sexual abuse at St. John's School for the Deaf and the protests against it years later by four of the victims.

== See also ==
- List of former schools in the Roman Catholic Archdiocese of Milwaukee
