= Salvage anthropology =

Approach to anthropological study

Salvage anthropology, related to salvage ethnography, is a term referring to the practice of collecting and documenting in the face of presumed cultural decline. In the late nineteenth and early twentieth century, salvage anthropology influenced collectors of all kinds, including those interested in music, material culture, and osteology. Ideas connected to salvage anthropology influenced how cultures were written about and documented through a wide range of publications and popular exhibitions.

== Origins of term ==
When the term was coined in the 1960s, it referred mainly to archeological efforts to find cultural information before an area was obliterated by the construction of reservoirs, power plants, or roads, or before land was leveled for irrigation. These projects were often conducted under time restrictions, based on when the area was slated for destruction.

Despite the origins of the term, "salvage anthropology" is most frequently used to describe Euro-American attempts to "preserve" Native American culture in the 19th and 20th centuries. While the term "salvage anthropology" did not emerge until later, a widespread belief in the eventual extinction of Indigenous societies drove widespread efforts to document, record, and collect.

== Vanishing race theory ==
Beginning in the Jacksonian Era, many Americans subscribed to the belief that Native Americans were "vanishing". Despite the fact that governmental actions, including the forced removal of the Cherokee from Georgia via the Trail of Tears, had much to do with the declining population of Native Americans in the Eastern United States, leading American thinkers shifted the causes of "disappearance" to the Indians' own destiny to give way to whites. In addition to the belief that Native Americans would physically vanish due to forced migration, disease, and war, Americans also held the belief that Indians would "culturally" vanish through contact with whites and forced assimilation. Because of this belief, Euro-Americans took on the responsibility of externally preserving the cultural memory and traditions of Native Americans, particularly through collecting tribal objects.

== Changing meanings of artifacts ==
Since Native Americans were erroneously thought to be going extinct, white American anthropologists did not trust them to preserve their own traditions within their communities and began an effort in the late nineteenth century to dispossess communities of spiritual and other items, which would be transplanted into museums. As Euro-Americans removed sacred objects from their communities, they placed spiritual items into an educational context. Although the collectors believed they were using these objects to showcase the memory of a "vanishing" people, the objects were taken from actual people, many of whom believed that public display was disrespectful and potentially harmful to viewers. Many Native Americans also believed that exhibiting sacred objects stripped the items of their spiritual power. By creating new meanings for the objects on display, in attempts to externally preserve a culture, anthropologists and collectors diminished the meaning that items held for the people who had created them.

== Collection methods ==
Nineteenth- and early-twentieth century salvage anthropology often was undertaken through disrespectful and disingenuous methods. Archeologists often removed artifacts and human remains from grave sites, paying little attention to whether they were actively being used to bury relatives of tribe members. As archeologists and anthropologists scrambled to preserve a "disappearing" culture, they disrupted memorialization of relatives and ancestors. By the late 1980s, it was estimated that museums, other institutions and private collectors possessed between 300,000 and 2.5 million bodies of Native Americans. Many objects were also obtained without the consent of their owners. Alanson Buck Skinner, who collected for the American Museum of Natural History from 1910 to 1914, was known as "The Little Weasel," because of his collection techniques. Skinner used deception to acquire objects from the Menomini, claiming that the objects would be held in a "sacred place" with many other Menomini objects. By thus removing objects from native cultures, American anthropologists took on the power to interpret and create narratives for the objects, rather than allowing them to remain part of Native cultural memory.
