= Albion Brewery =

San Francisco defunct brewery

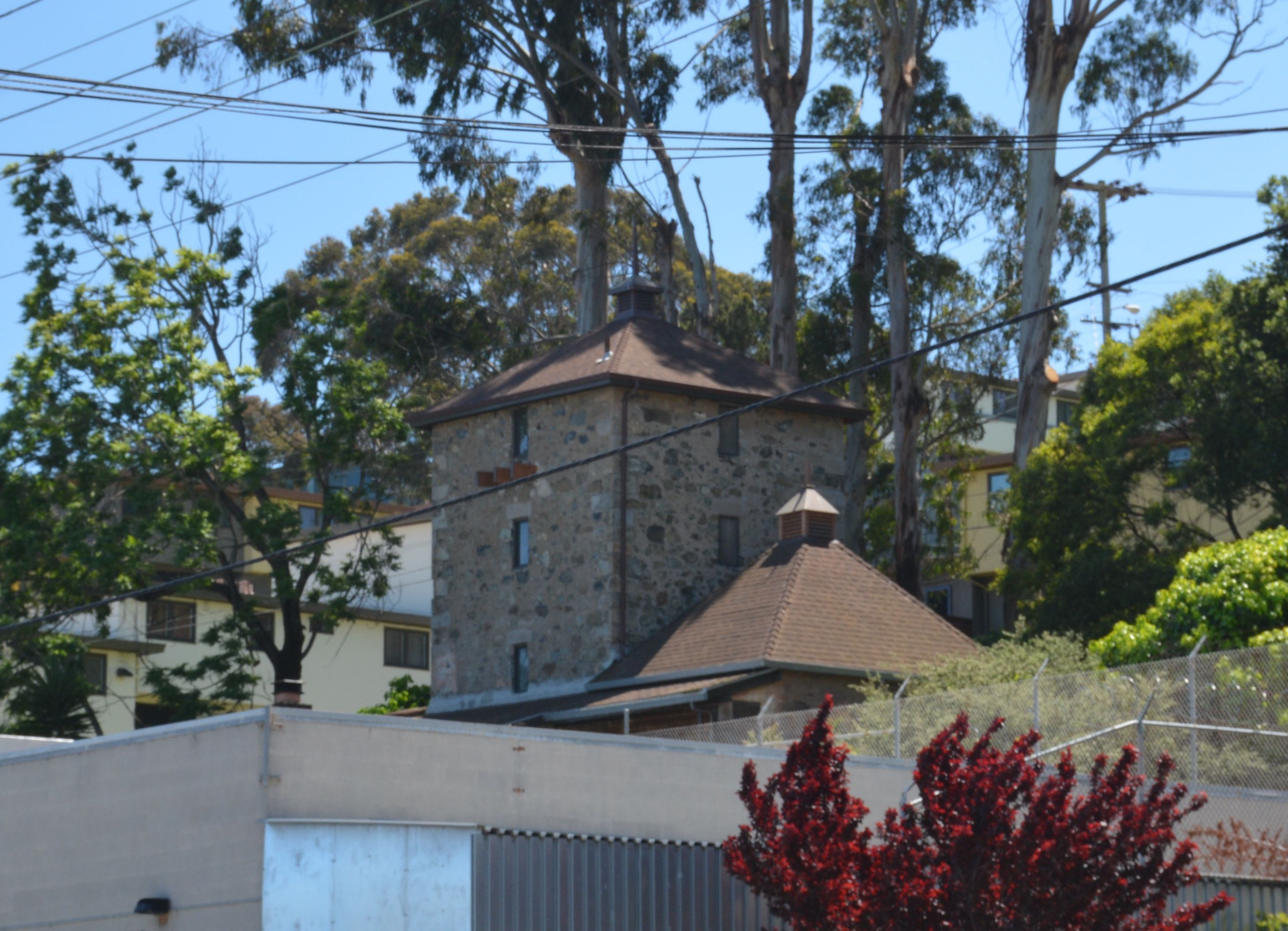

- Location within San Francisco County
- Alternative names: Albion Castle

General information
- Type: Light manufacturing, Home
- Location: 881 Innes Avenue; San Francisco, California
- Coordinates: 37.731569°N 122.375534°W
- Completed: 1870

Design and construction
- Architect: John Hamlyn Burnell

San Francisco Designated Landmark
- Designated: 5 April 1974
- Reference no.: 60

The Albion Brewery, also known as Albion Ale And Porter Brewing Company and the Albion Castle, is a defunct brewery in San Francisco, California in operation from 1875 until approximately 1919. The site of the former brewery is also the location of the Hunters Point Springs, at 881 Innes Avenue. This building and site is a San Francisco Designated Landmark, listed on April 5, 1974. The building is now privately owned and has hosted events.

== History ==
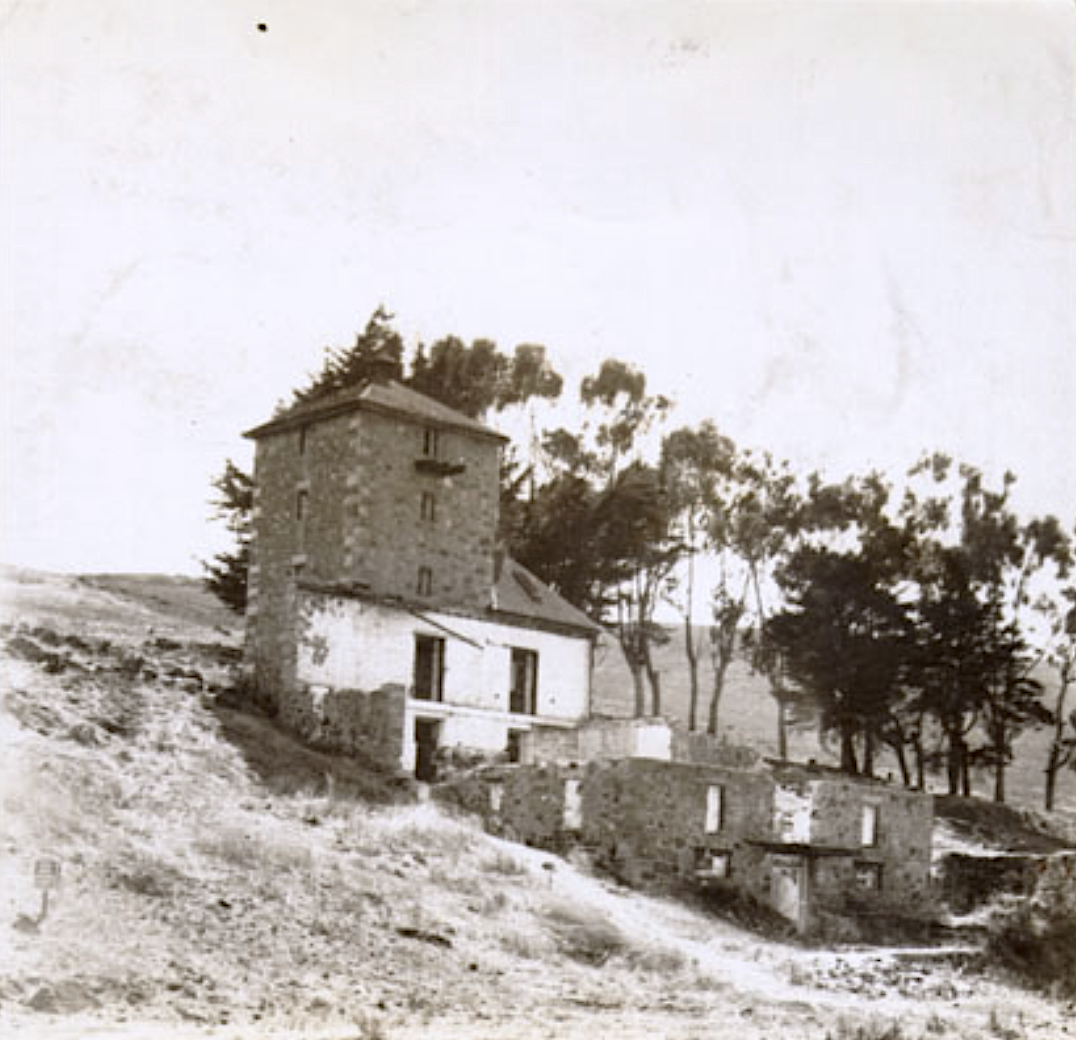
Ruins of the Albion Ale and Porter Brewery, c. 1920

=== Albion Ale And Porter Brewing Company ===
The name "Albion" is an ancient name for Britain, which was also used by Francis Drake when he arrived in nearby Point Reyes (then known as Nova Albion).

John Hamlin Burnell (c. 1828 –1890) had immigrated in 1849 to San Francisco, from East Hoathly, East Sussex, England. Burnell purchased the property because of the spring water aquifer; there were only two natural occurring aquifer in the San Francisco-area (according to a 1878 publication). The building was built in 1870 as the site for his brewery, on Hunter's Point Ridge near Innes Avenue and Griffith Street. An Ohlone settlement may have been in this location at one time. He built the building and hand carved the two 200-foot caverns.

In 1875, Burnell returned to England to marry Fanny Constable and bring her back to San Francisco. To create the beer, Burnell imported the hops and malt from England. The San Francisco Chronicle wrote in 1887 that the Albion beer was equal to Guinness in taste, however much cheaper.

He died in 1890, then the brewery was operated by his wife and later his brother Frederick Burnell. The brewery closed in 1919, due to the death of Fanny Burnell and the beginning of the Prohibition.

=== Albion Water Company and private residence ===
The building reopened in 1928 as the Albion Water Company under the leadership of Leonard Mees, selling bottled spring water in a space next door. Over time the building starts to need repairs.

In 1933, sculptor Adrien Voisin purchased the building to use as his home and art studio, over the span of almost 20 years he worked to restore it. Voisin added to the structure more living spaces, some of which had a touch of art deco-styling.

=== San Francisco Mountain Springs Water Company ===
In 1964, the property was purchased by the San Francisco Mountain Springs Water Company in order to use the springs. The San Francisco Mountain Springs Water Company supplied the city with jugs of water for water coolers. After the sale, Voisin was allowed to remain living on the property.

From 1998 to 2005, Eric Higgs, an artist and co-founder of citysearch.com had purchased the home. The building has changed hands many times.

The Albion Brewery building has been rumored to be haunted by a ghost in the form of a young, dark-haired woman; and was the filming location in 2019 for the television show Ghost Adventures.

== Architecture ==
The main building, a Norman-style stone castle sits above two 200-foot cistern caverns, capturing and holding up to 10,000 gallons spring water, from the Hunters Point Springs a naturally occurring aquifer.

There are conflicting stories on how the main building was constructed. One theory is he used English stonemasons and nearby "float rock" from Bayview Hill; another is that he used the limestone ballast found in English and French ships which was later replaced. The beer factory stood in front of the tower, however that has long since collapsed (possibly as early as in 1906).

The main building is a slender, four story tower with a kitchen, living room, dining room, and each floor contains an extra room that could be used for either a bedroom or a sitting area. The top of the tower has views of India Basin.

== See also ==
- List of breweries in California
- List of defunct breweries in the United States
- List of San Francisco Designated Landmarks
- New Albion Brewing Company
