= Dominican College of Racine =

Defunct college in Racine, Wisconsin, U.S

Dominican College of Racine was a college in Racine, Wisconsin.

Established in 1864 as St. Catherine's Female Academy, it was later known as St. Albertus Junior College (1935–1946), Dominican College (1946–1957), Dominican College of Racine (1957–1972), and College of Racine (1972–1974).

== History ==
It was founded in 1864 in Racine by the Sisters of the Order of St. Dominic as St. Catherine's Female Academy

- In 1888, a normal school was added to the academy to train young women of the community for the teaching profession.
- In 1924, St. Catherine's High School was built in Racine and the academy closed, but the normal school continued to operate until 1935 when St. Albertus Junior College replaced it.
- In 1935, accreditation was obtained from the University of Wisconsin
- In 1946, the school changed its name to Dominican College, added a fourth year of study, admitted full-time lay students for the first time and the State Department of Education granted approval for the school to confer Bachelor of Science degrees in Music and Education.
- In 1948, the first graduation ceremony was held with 6 graduates and a full-time advisory board was instituted.
- In 1955, the Congregation of St. Catherine of Sienna purchased 25 acres of lake frontage, five miles north of Racine, as a site for an expanded campus and
- In 1957, the school was incorporated as Dominican College of Racine, Incorporated and the following year, groundbreaking occurred at the new campus
- In September 1960, the school moved to the new campus with 363 full and part-time students and a faculty of 30 nuns, 2 priests and a lay business manager.
- In 1962, it was accredited by North Central Association of Colleges and Secondary Schools and purchased additional land
- In 1968, management of the college was transferred from the Dominican Sisters to an independent nondenominational board.
- In 1970, after Mount Saint Paul College in Waukesha, WI, closed its doors, it merged with Dominican College of Racine. (Mount St. Paul initially was founded for seminarians and then later accepted other students.)
- In 1970, the college also underwent a major administrative reorganization, involving restructuring of administrative positions and responsibilities, and replacement of the traditional academic departments with four broad divisions.
- In 1972, a program offering a Masters of Science Degree in Education was introduced, and the college changed its name to the College of Racine.
- In 1973, it joined the Union of Experimenting Colleges and Universities and introduced the Racine Plan, a year-round academic program of six short terms.

== Sports ==
In 63-64 Dominican's basketball team was known as the Shakespearean Players. When Paul Pryor was hired during the first part of 64–65, he began by changing the name to the Squires. The school started playing intercollegiate basketball in the 1964–1965 season. They continued to play under the name of the Squires In addition to basketball, the 1966-67 Squires also participated in intercollegiate golf, tennis and softball. By 1968, the school had changed its nickname to the Lakers.

During the 1973–1974 school year, Bill Cofield was hired as athletic director and basketball head coach, becoming the nation's first black athletic director and head coach at a predominantly white institution of higher learning.

Bo Ryan began his collegiate coaching career in 1973 as an assistant coach under Bill Cofield, the Dominican basketball team went 14-15 that year. During that same season, Ryan would earn the first of many Coach of the Year honors in his career as head coach of the Dominican baseball team.

== Notable faculty and alumni ==
=== Faculty ===
- Bill Cofield - American basketball coach and was the first African American head coach of a major sport in the Big Ten Conference
- Paul Pryor - National League Umpire
- Bo Ryan - Head Coach of University of Wisconsin–Madison Badgers men's basketball team

=== Alumni ===
- Robert R. Bruno Jr. - American artist, inventor, and businessman
- Marcel Dandeneau '60, '74 - Member of the Wisconsin State Assembly
- George N. Gillett, Jr. '61 - Businessman
- William D. Lutz '62 - American Linguist
- Rose Thering '53 - Roman Catholic Dominican Religious Sister, who gained note as an activist against antisemitism

== See also ==
- List of former schools in the Roman Catholic Archdiocese of Milwaukee
