= John Louis Clarke =

American artist (1881–1970)

- Cutapuis
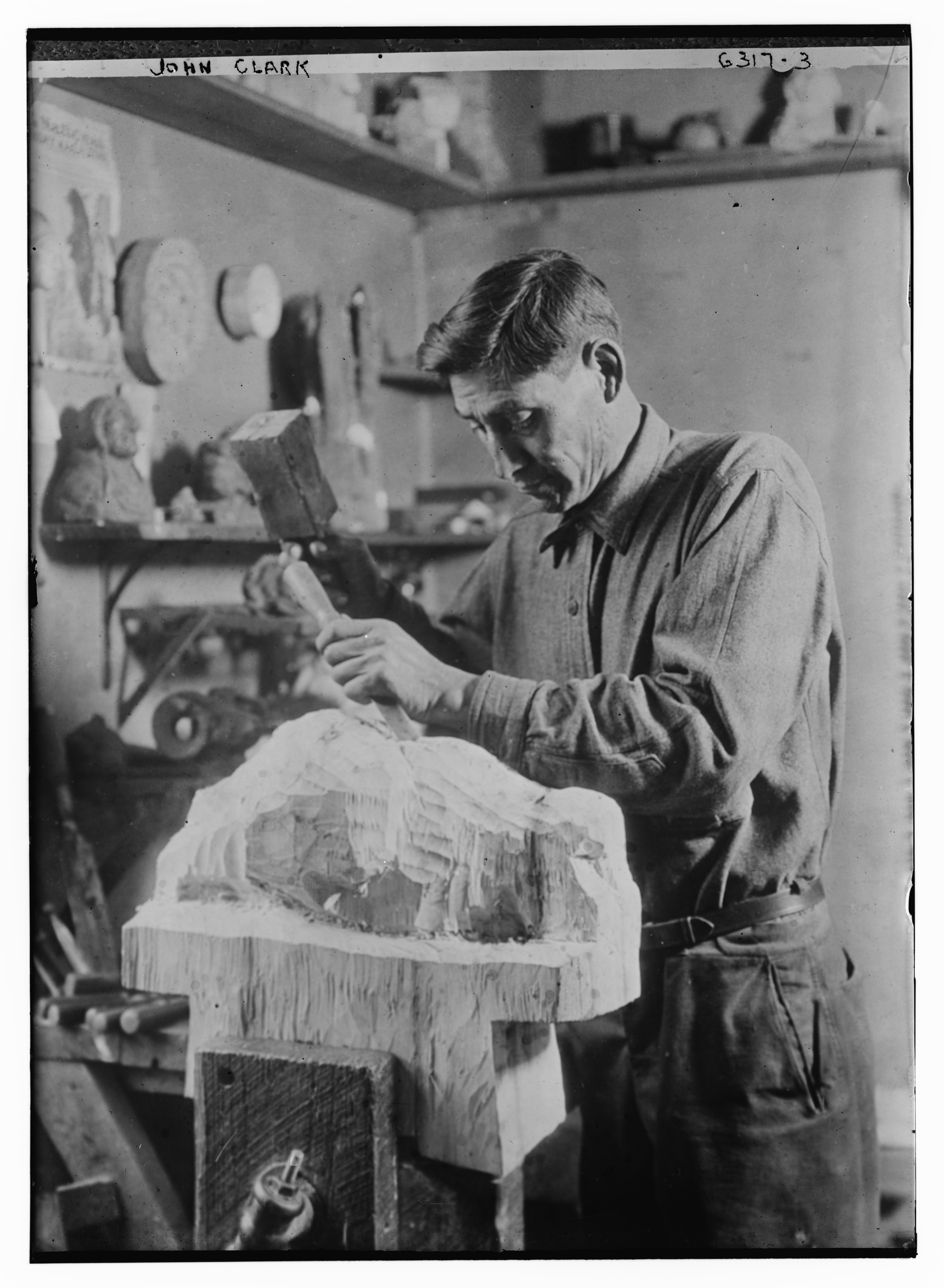
- Born: May 10, 1881; Highwood, Montana, U.S.
- Died: November 20, 1970 (aged 89); East Glacier, Montana, U.S.
- Other names: Cut-a-puis, "Man Who Talks Not"
- Citizenship: Blackfeet Tribe, United States
- Occupation: Artist
- Known for: Woodcarving, painting
- Spouse: Mary "Mamie" Simon
- Children: 1

John Louis Clarke ("Cutapuis"; May 10, 1881 – November 20, 1970) was a Blackfeet artist and woodcarver from East Glacier, Montana who was deaf and mute, he was noted for his wildlife carvings related to Glacier National Park. His Blackfoot name was "Cutapuis" (The Man Who Talks Not).

== Early life ==
John Louis Clarke was born in Highwood, Montana on May 10, 1881, to Horace J. Clarke and Margaret First Kill (daughter of Chief Stands Alone). Both of his parents were Blackfoot, and he was one of eight children. He was the grandson of Montana fur trader Major Malcolm Clarke. Malcolm Clarke was murdered by a band of Piegan Blackfeet at his Prickly Pear Creek ranch north of Helena, Montana on August 17, 1869, an event that led directly to the Marias Massacre in January 1870. During the 1869 raid on Malcolm Clarke's ranch, Horace, John's father was badly wounded.

At the age of two, scarlet fever left John deaf during an outbreak that killed four of his brothers. Because of his condition, he was given the Blackfoot name of "Cutapuis" or "Man Who Talks Not" at an early age. His education began in 1894 at the North Dakota School for the Deaf at Devils Lake, North Dakota. He also attended the Montana Deaf and Dumb Asylum at Boulder, Montana; the St. John's School for the Deaf in St. Francis, Wisconsin; and Fort Shaw Indian Boarding School in Fort Shaw, Montana. Although he learned wood carving in school, he never received any formal art education.

In 1888, while John was at school, the Clarke family moved to Midvale, Montana, which later became known as East Glacier Park Village. John's father Horace became a prominent Blackfoot tribal leader and was instrumental in the treaty and land sale that ceded Blackfoot lands to the United States federal government for the new national park. In 1918, he married Mary "Mamie" Simon, and together they adopted one daughter. His wife acted as a business partner and helped with sales.

== Career ==
John returned to live and work in East Glacier in 1912 to 1913. Glacier National Park had been created in 1910, and John Clarke began working as a guide for tourists in the eastern portions of the park. Clarke opened and operated an art studio up until his death in 1970, in what is now East Glacier Park Village, Montana. Notable art students included Albert Racine.

One of Clarke's sculptures was owned by Warren G. Harding and was displayed in the White House. In 1924, John D. Rockefeller purchased 4 of Clarke's sculptures. In 1940, Clarke was commissioned to create a pair of relief panels. When they were completed they each weighed more than a ton, today the two panels adorn the Blackfeet Hospital lobby. His work is in the collection at the Montana Historical Society and the [Montana Museum of Art and Culture] at the University of Montana in Missoula, Montana.
