= List of former schools in the Roman Catholic Archdiocese of Milwaukee =

This is a list of former schools in the Roman Catholic Archdiocese of Milwaukee.

== Colleges and universities ==
- Dominican College of Racine, Racine
- Holy Redeemer College, Waterford
- Mt. St. Paul College, Waukesha

== High schools ==
- Divine Savior High School, Milwaukee
- Don Bosco High School, Milwaukee
- Francis Jordan High School, Milwaukee
- Holy Angels Academy, Milwaukee
- Madonna High School, Milwaukee
- Mercy High School, Milwaukee
- Notre Dame High School, Milwaukee
- Pio Nono High School, St. Francis
- Sacred Heart High School, Milwaukee
- St. Benedict the Moor High School, Milwaukee

St. Benedict the Moor High School was established in 1935 by Fr. Philip Steffes, OFM Cap, the pastor of St. Benedict the Moor Parish, a mostly African American community. It served both boarding and day high school students, many of whom came from St. Benedict the Moor Elementary School, the other parish school. Demographic changes and the construction of an expressway during the 1960s caused the parish membership and its schools' enrollment to severely decline. St. Benedict the Moor High School closed in 1964.

- St. Bonaventure High School, Sturtevant
- St. Francis de Sales High School, St. Francis
- St. John's Cathedral High School, Milwaukee
- St. John School for the Deaf, St. Francis
- St. Mary's Academy, St. Francis

== Middle schools ==
San Juan Diego Middle School, Racine

== Elementary schools ==
- St. Adalbert School, South Milwaukee
- St. Agnes Elementary School, Milwaukee
- St. Albert School, Milwaukee
- All Saints School, Milwaukee (merger of St. Casimir and St. Mary Czestocowa Schools)
- Alverno Elementary School, Milwaukee
- St. Anne School, Milwaukee
- St. Barbara's Elementary School, Milwaukee
- St. Benedict the Moore Elementary School, Milwaukee
  St. Benedict the Moor Elementary School was established in 1912 by Fr. Stephen Eckert, OFM Cap, the pastor of St. Benedict the Moor Parish, a mostly African American community. It served both boarding and day high school students. By 1935, there were 141 boarders and 130 day students (99% of whom were not Catholic), and a faculty of 22 Racine Dominican Sisters. The boarding school program was ended in 1954 at the request of the nuns, who could no longer service it. Demographic changes and the construction of an expressway during the 1960s caused the parish membership and its schools' enrollment to severely decline. St. Benedict the Moor Elementary School closed in 1967 after losing half its property to the expressway.
- St. Boniface School, Milwaukee
- St. Casimir School, Milwaukee
  St. Casimir School was established by Fr. Giles Tarasiewicz, the first pastor of the newly created Polish St. Casimir Parish. He and other parishioners set out to address their largest concern: the lack of a parochial school to educate the parish's many youth. The building was designed by architect Henry Messmer and was constructed from 1893-1894. The building is three stories tall, built of cream brick in the Victorian Romanesque Revival style with a hip roof and asphalt shingles. It opened for classes in 1894, and also housed the School Sisters of Notre Dame, who taught at the school, as well as holding Sunday Masses in its gymnasium. The school population continued to increase in size along with the parish, so in 1910 two-story cream brick addition was added to the back of the building, designed by Herman J. Esser. Starting in the 1950s, the parish and school began seeing a decline in population. St. Casimir School was closed in the 1970s due to declining enrollment and a lack of teachers.
- St. Casimir School, Racine
- Corpus Christi Catholic School, Milwaukee
- St. Elizabeth Elementary School, Milwaukee
- St. Francis of Assisi School, Milwaukee
- St. Frederick Elementary School, Cudahy
- St. Gall's School, Milwaukee
- St. Hedwig School, Milwaukee
  St. Hedwig School was built in 1889 and was staffed by the School Sisters of Notre Dame until its closure.
- Holy Angels Elementary School, Milwaukee
- Holy Assumption School, West Allis
- Holy Cross School, Belgium
- Holy Family School, Cudahy
- Holy Name School, Racine
- Holy Redeemer School, Milwaukee
- Holy Rosary School, Milwaukee
- Holy Spirit Grade School, Milwaukee
- Holy Trinity School, Milwaukee
- St. John's Catholic Grade School, South Milwaukee
- St. John de Nepomuc Elementary School, Milwaukee
  St. John de Nepomuc Elementary School was established in 1927 and served the children of parishioners of the Bohemian and German-speaking St. John de Nepomuc Parish. It opened with four classrooms and was staffed by School Sisters of Notre Dame. This soon became too crowded, and in 1955, a new school building opened to hold the burgeoning number of pupils. By the 1980s, the St. John's was thriving, but the parish was struggling to pay its bills and was being subsidized by the school. In 1985 the Archdiocese demoted St. John's parish to a chapel, and closed the school for good.
- St. Joseph School, Cudahy
- St. Joseph School, Fond du Lac
- St. Lawrence School, Milwaukee
- St. Malachy School, Horicon
- St. Mary School, Fond du Lac
- St. Mary School, Sheboygan Falls
- St. Mary School, South Milwaukee
- St. Mary Czestochowa School, Milwaukee
- Mary, Queen of Martyrs School, Milwaukee
- St. Matthew School, Milwaukee
- St. Matthias School, Nenno
- St. Michael School, Milwaukee
- Mother of Perpetual Help School, Milwaukee
- Mother of Sorrows School, Little Kohler
- St. Nicholas School, Milwaukee
- Our Lady of Sorrows School, Milwaukee
- St. Patrick School, Fond du Lac
- St. Peter School, St. Peter
- St. Philip Neri School, Milwaukee
- St. Rita School, Milwaukee
- St. Rose of Lima School, Fredonia
- St. Rose School, Racine
- Sacred Heart School, Allenton
- St. Stanislaus School, Racine
- St. Stephen Martyr School, Milwaukee
- St. Sylvester School, South Milwaukee
- St. Thomas Aquinas School, Milwaukee
