= Dubai International Capital =

International investment arm of Dubai Holding

- Type: Subsidiary (international investment arm)
- Industry: Diversified Investments
- Founded: October 2004
- Founder: Sheikh Mohammed bin Rashid Al Maktoum
- Headquarters: Dubai, United Arab Emirates
- Key people: David Smoot (CEO)
- Website: www.dubaiic.com

Dubai International Capital (DIC) is the international investment arm of Dubai Holding, a global conglomerate and sovereign wealth fund of the government of Dubai and its ruling family. DIC invests private funds on behalf of Dubai Holding and several large third-party investors around the world with a mandate to build a portfolio of internationally diversified assets.

DIC, which was founded in 2004, invests in public and private equity through three divisions:

- Private Equity: Invests in mid-cap companies in Europe and North America with a focus on secondary buy-outs that include Travelodge, Merlin Entertainments, Doncasters, Mauser, Alliance Medical and Almatis.
- Emerging Markets: Manages a broad investment program across the Middle East and North Africa region, including LBOs, funds and co-investments, infrastructure, growth and development capital
- Public Equities: Focused on investment in Fortune 500 companies through its DFSA regulated US$1.5 billion Global Strategic Equities Fund. The fund has invested in global leaders such as Sony and EADS.

== Holdings ==
DIC's investments across its divisions include:

Private Equity:

- The Tussauds Group – purchased in 2005 from Charterhouse Capital Partners for £800 million ($1.5 billion). Subsequently, sold in March 2007 to Merlin Entertainments for £1.025bn, though DIC now has 18% in the combined company. The remaining stock DIC held in the combined company was sold in 2010.
- Doncasters Group Ltd – In May 2006, DIC acquired Doncasters Group Ltd. for £700 million. Doncasters is a British precision-engineering company with plants in Connecticut, Illinois and Georgia that make precision engineered components and systems for applications in a variety of industries.
- Travelodge – purchased the UK budget hotel group in 2006 for £675m (1.02bn euros). Travelodge is the fastest expanding hotel chain in Europe.
- Merlin Entertainments Group – In March 2007 DIC merged The Tussauds Group with Blackstone's Merlin Entertainments Group to create the second largest visitor attractions operator in the world after Disney. DIC received £1.025 bn cash and retained an 18% stake in the combined company. This stake was sold in 2010.
- Fastentech – In May 2007 DIC-owned Doncasters acquired FastenTech for US$500m in a bolt-on acquisition from Court Square Capital. FastenTech is a leading international manufacturer of industrial and aerospace-grade fasteners and has a strong presence in the US.
- Mauser Group – purchased the German industrial packaging company in June 2007 for €850m – one of the world's leading industrial packaging firms. Has been sold in August 2014.

Emerging Markets:

- Jordan Dubai Capital: A US$300 million private equity fund dedicated to investments in Jordan, launched in 2005.
- Ishraq: A US$150 million investment company focused on delivering the budget hotel concept across the Middle East, established in 2005.
- MENA Infrastructure Fund: Launched the US$500 million MENA Infrastructure as co-Anchor with HSBC and Waha Capital in 2006. It targets investments in the infrastructure and energy sectors across the Middle East and North Africa.
- Rivoli Group: In 2007, DIC acquired a substantial stake in the UAE-based luxury goods retailer.
- KEF Holdings: DIC acquired a 45% stake in the leading UAE-based foundry in 2008, catering mainly to the oil and gas industry.

Public Equities:

- Daimler AG: acquired a 2% stake for $1 billion in German carmaker Daimler, making it the company's third largest shareholder in 2005. It was divested in 2007.
- EADS: acquired a 3.12% stake for $838 million in Europe's largest aircraft and defense manufacturer and Airbus parent company. Has since been sold.
- Sony: acquired a 3% stake for $1.5 billion Has since been sold.

== English Premier League Team ==
On a number of occasions, DIC tried to buy into Liverpool F.C., in part because DIC chief Sameer al-Ansari is a LFC fan and season ticket holder:

- 3 December 2006: DIC and Liverpool revealed that DIC were in exclusive negotiations to potentially buy or invest in the football club. Liverpool later accepted an offer made by American tycoons, George Gillett and Tom Hicks.
- 22 December 2007: DIC looked to invest in the club alongside Gillett/Hicks, as the club's owners suffered financial difficulties. However, Hicks later dismissed holding any talks with DIC and even DIC making a bid for his share.
- 14 February 2008: reported that DIC have 'the outline of an agreement to purchase the Reds from George Gillett and Tom Hicks, and a deal could go through by mid-March' for a sum of around £500M. Gillett then announced that he was willing to sell his 50% stake alone to DIC.
- 10 March 2008: Hicks announced via the Liverpool website that he has terminated further discussions with DIC. Hicks was apparently not willing to allow DIC to be involved in football decisions.
- 15 September 2008: Premier League rivals Newcastle United linked with DIC. However, DIC have stated they are not planning a fresh bid for Liverpool, nor were they in talks with any other side from England's top flight.
