= Salvage ethnography =

Recording of practices of endangered cultures

Salvage ethnography is the recording of the practices and folklore of cultures threatened with extinction, including as a result of modernization and assimilation. It is generally associated with the American anthropologist Franz Boas; he and his students aimed to record vanishing Native American cultures. Since the 1960s, anthropologists have used the term as part of a critique of 19th-century ethnography and early modern anthropology.

== Etymology ==
The term "salvage ethnography" was coined by Jacob W. Gruber, who identified its emergence with 19th-century ethnographers documenting the languages of peoples being conquered and colonized by European countries or the United States. According to Gruber, one of the first official statements acknowledging that a major effect of colonialism was the destruction of existing languages and ways of life was The report of the British Select Committee of Aborigines (1837).

As a scholarly response, Gruber quotes James Cowles Prichard's address before the British Association for the Advancement of Science in 1839, referring to the Old Testament tale of Cain and Abel:

Wherever Europeans have settled, their arrival has been the harbinger of extermination to the native tribes. Whenever the simple pastoral tribes come into relations with the more civilised agricultural nations, the allotted time of their destruction is at hand; and this seems to have been the case from the time when the first shepherd fell by the hand of the first tiller of soil. Now, as the progress of colonization is so much extended of late years, and the obstacle of distance and physical difficulties are so much overcome, it may be calculated that these calamities, impending over the greater part of mankind, if we reckon by families and races, are to be accelerated in their progress; and it may happen that, in the course of another century, the aboriginal nations of most parts of the world will have ceased entirely to exist. In the meantime, if Christian nations think it not their duty to interpose and save the numerous tribes of their own species from utter extermination, it is of the greatest importance, in a philosophical point of view, to obtain much more extensive information than we now possess of their physical and moral characters. A great number of curious problems in physiology, illustrative of the history of the species, and the laws of their propagation, remain as yet imperfectly solved. The psychology of these races has been but little studied in an enlightened manner; and yet this is wanting in order to complete the history of human nature, and the philosophy of the human mind. How can this be obtained when so many tribes shall have become extinct, and their thoughts shall have perished with them?

== Conservation and art ==
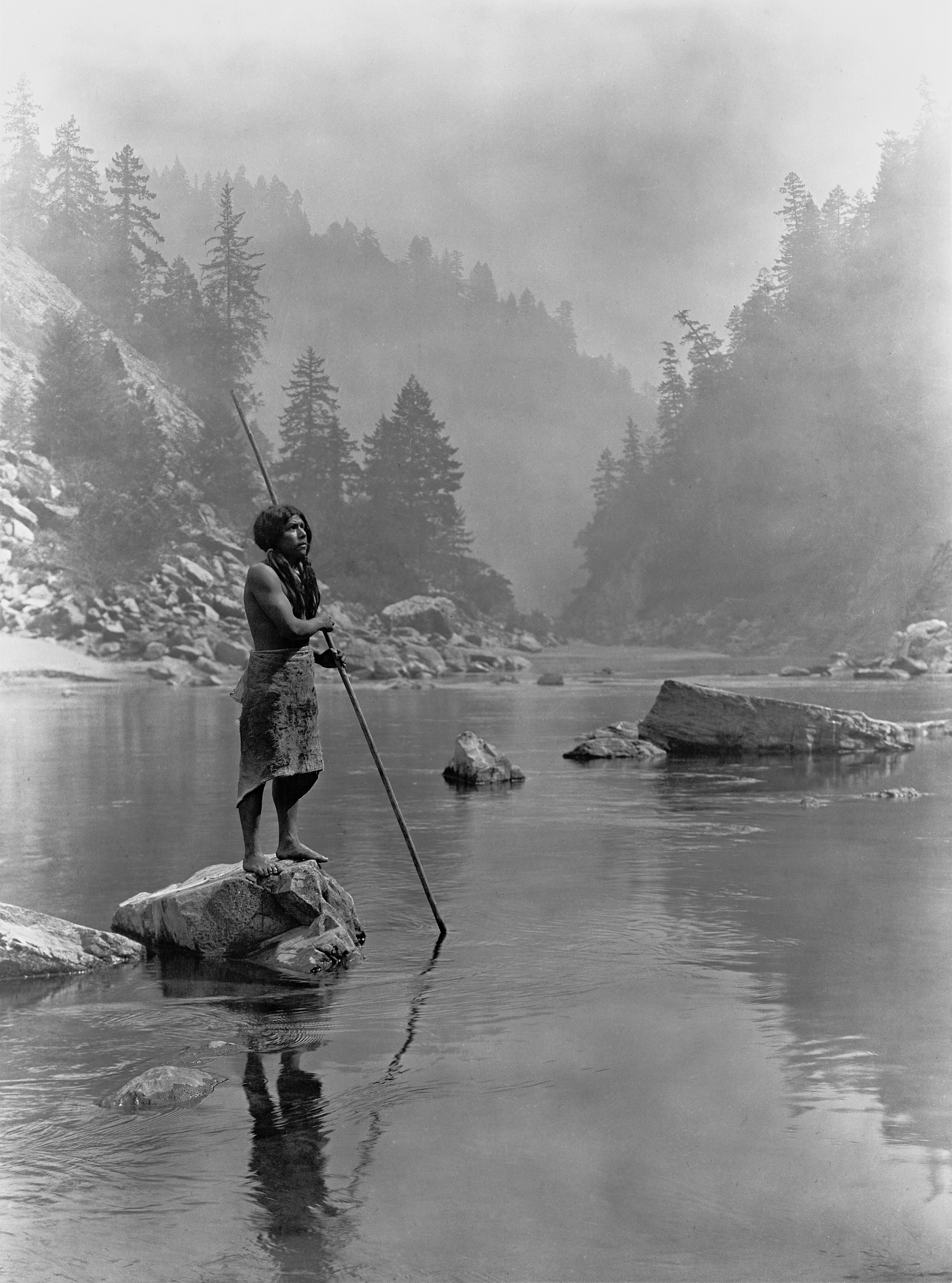
A Hupa fisherman. In the early 20th century, Edward Curtis traveled across America recording photographs of the disappearing lifestyle of American Indian tribes.

Frances Densmore (1867–1957), an influential ethnomusicologist, worked in the tradition of salvage ethnography. Densmore recorded the songs and lyrics of Native Americans in an attempt to preserve them permanently. Many of her original recordings, preserved on wax cylinders, are archived at the Library of Congress.

Artists compounded the work of professional anthropologists during this time period. Photographer Edward S. Curtis (1868–1952) was preceded by painter George Catlin (1796–1872) in attempting to capture indigenous North American traditions that they believed to be disappearing. Both Curtis and Catlin have been accused of taking artistic license by embellishing a scene or making something appear more authentically "Native American". Curtis notes in the introduction to his series on the North American Indian: "The information that is to be gathered ... respecting the mode of life of one of the great races of mankind, must be collected at once or the opportunity will be lost."

Salvage ethnography started to be applied methodically in visual anthropology as ethnographic film since the 1950s by filmmakers such as Jean Rouch in France, Michel Brault and Pierre Perrault in Canada, or António Campos in Portugal (early 1960s), followed by others (1970s).

Salvage ethnography is often taught in film and media studies courses as a style of filmmaking that captures a civilization or people's former way of living. The best example of this would be Robert Flaherty's Nanook of the North. In Nanook, Flaherty staged incidents and scenes that did not fairly represent the Inuit tribe's current way of life, but rather their "former majesty".

== See also ==
- Documentary film
- Ethnofiction
- Ethnographic film
- Nanook of the North – 1922 American silent documentary film
- Salvage anthropology – related to salvage ethnography, but often refers specifically to the collection of cultural artifacts and human remains, rather than the general collection of data and images.
- Visual anthropology – a subfield of social anthropology, of all visual representations such as dance and other kinds of performance, museums and archiving, all visual arts, and the production and reception of mass media.

=== Related people ===
- Elias Bonine – American photographer known for his portraits of 19th century Native Americans.
- George Catlin – American painter, author, and traveler, who specialized in portraits of Native Americans in the Old West.
- Edward Sheriff Curtis – American photographer and ethnologist whose work focused on the American West and on Native American peoples.
- Frances Densmore – American anthropologist, ethnomusicologist, and ethnographer focused on Native American music and culture.
- Germaine Dieterlen – French anthropologist and student of Marcel Marcel Griaule, known for her studies of the Dogon people of West Africa.
- Marcel Griaule – French anthropologist known for his studies of the Dogon people of West Africa.
- Alfred L. Kroeber – American cultural anthropologist.
- Felipe Lettersten – a Peruvian artist who believed he was preserving the Amazon rainforest cultures by casting sculptures of indigenous people.
- Frank Speck – American anthropologist (1881–1950)
- Robert H. Lowie – Austrian-born American anthropologist, focused on North American Indians.
- Geraldine Moodie – Canadian photographer who took early photos of Indigenous peoples in Northern Canada.
- Jimmy Nelson – British photojournalist and photographer known for his portraits of tribal and indigenous peoples.
- Jean Rouch – French filmmaker and anthropologist focused on Africa.
- Richard Sanderville – Piegan Blackfoot linguist and interpreter, focused on the salvage of the Piegan dialect of the Blackfoot language and assisted Hugh L. Scott in preserving Plains Indian Sign Language.
