= Bo Ryan =

American basketball coach (born 1947)

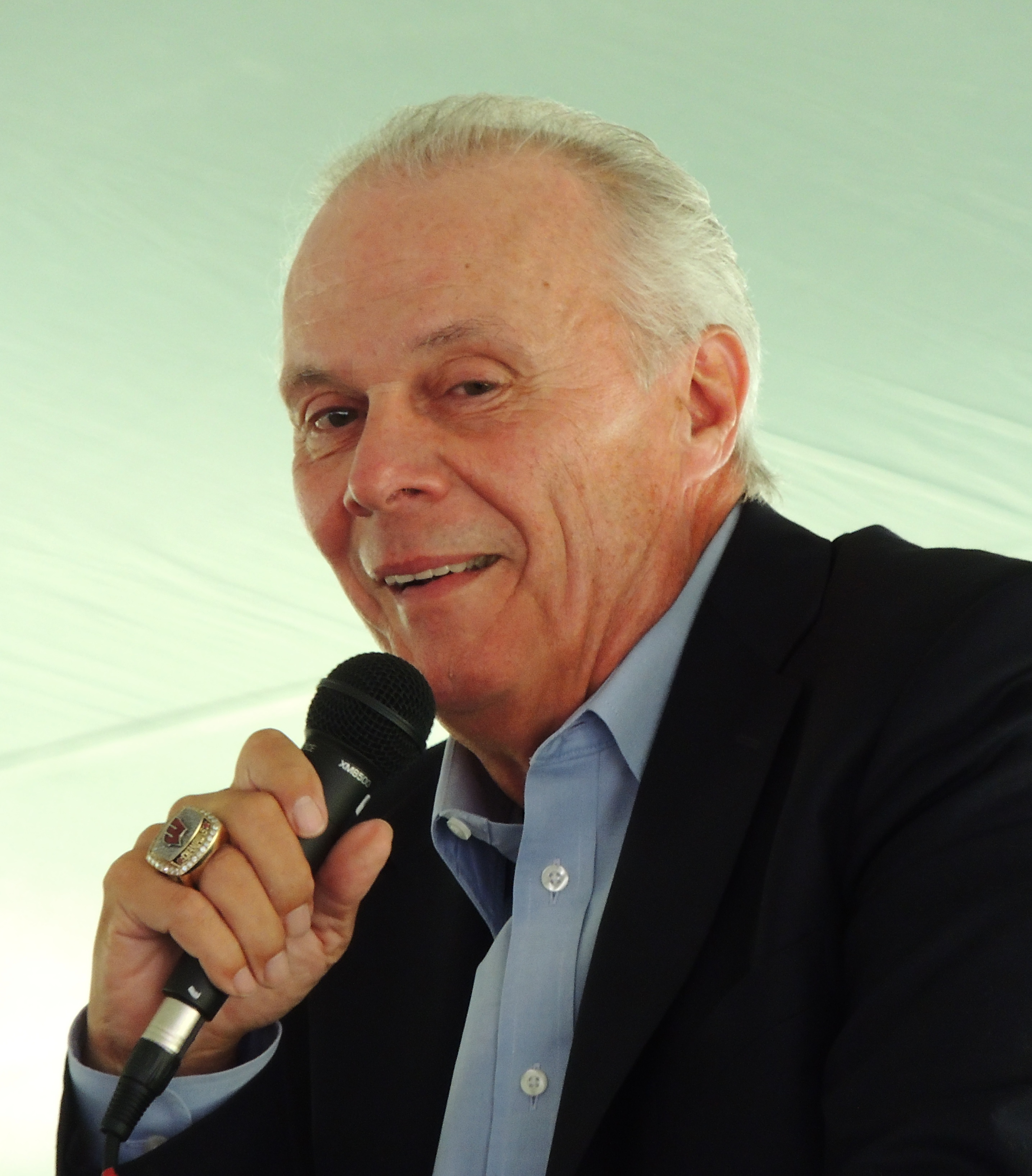
- Ryan in 2017

Biographical details
- Born: December 20, 1947 (age 78); Chester, Pennsylvania, U.S.

Playing career
- 1965–1969: Wilkes
- Position: Point guard

Coaching career (HC unless noted)
- 1972–1973: Brookhaven JHS
- 1973–1974: Dominican College of Racine (assistant)
- 1974–1976: Sun Valley HS
- 1976–1984: Wisconsin (assistant)
- 1984–1999: Wisconsin–Platteville
- 1999–2001: Milwaukee
- 2001–2015: Wisconsin

Head coaching record
- Overall: 747–233 (college)
- Tournaments: 25–14 (NCAA Division I)

Accomplishments and honors

Championships
- 4 NCAA Division III tournament (1991, 1995, 1998, 1999); 2 NCAA Division I Regional—Final Four (2014, 2015); 3 Big Ten tournament (2004, 2008, 2015); 4 Big Ten regular season (2002, 2003, 2008, 2015)

Awards
- Clair Bee Coach of the Year (2007); 4× Big Ten Coach of the Year (2002, 2003, 2013, 2015); Jim Phelan Award (2008); Adolph Rupp Cup (2007)
- Basketball Hall of Fame; Inducted in 2024 (profile)
- College Basketball Hall of Fame; Inducted in 2017

William Francis "Bo" Ryan Jr. (born December 20, 1947) is an American former college basketball coach. He was the head coach of the Wisconsin Badgers men's basketball team of the University of Wisconsin–Madison from 2001 to December 2015. Ryan served as the head men's basketball coach at the University of Wisconsin–Platteville from 1984 to 1999 and at the University of Wisconsin–Milwaukee from 1999 to 2001. His overall collegiate coaching record was 747–233. Ryan was inducted into the College Basketball Hall of Fame in 2017 and the Naismith Memorial Basketball Hall of Fame in 2024.

== Playing career ==
Ryan began playing basketball at a very young age. His father, Butch Ryan was already a legend in the area, coaching youth sports including basketball to under-privileged children in Chester, Pennsylvania. Butch taught him the skills to be a successful point guard, generally the position of the on-court team leader. He became a star basketball player, leading his high school team to a 25–1 record in his senior year. In addition to basketball, Ryan was a high school quarterback. The center snapping him the ball was Ted Cottrell, who later served as a defensive coach and coordinator for a number of teams in the NFL. Ryan lettered in football, basketball and baseball, and was president of his class. After high school, Ryan starred as a point guard at Wilkes College in Wilkes-Barre, Pennsylvania. His love for the game drove him to remain involved with the sport, choosing to delve into the coaching profession.

== Coaching career ==
=== Early years ===
After a playing career at Wilkes University, Ryan graduated in 1969, and began graduate work, attending Villanova University in Villanova, Pennsylvania.

Ryan's coaching career began in 1972 at Brookhaven Junior High School in Delaware County, Pennsylvania, where for one year he worked as a history teacher and basketball head coach.

In 1973, Ryan began his collegiate coaching career at Dominican College of Racine in Racine, Wisconsin. He won a Coach of the Year award as head baseball coach at Dominican while serving as an assistant basketball coach under Bill Cofield. In 1974, Dominican College closed down. Ryan then became head basketball coach at Sun Valley High School in Aston, Pennsylvania in 1974, where he was named conference coach of the year in 1976.

His success at Dominic College and Sun Valley led to a job as assistant head coach at the University of Wisconsin–Madison under head coaches Bill Cofield and Steve Yoder from 1976 to 1984.

=== Wisconsin–Platteville (1984–1999) ===
After his stint as an assistant, Ryan accepted the head coaching position at the University of Wisconsin–Platteville. From 1984 until 1999, Ryan's Platteville team posted a 352–76 overall record, an .820 winning percentage. Ryan guided the UW–Platteville Pioneers to four national championships (1991, 1995, 1998 and 1999). He also won eight Wisconsin Intercollegiate Athletic Conference championships and set a Division III scoring defense record in 1997, with his team only allowing 47.5 points per game.

During Ryan's tenure, UW-Platteville was the winningest NCAA men's basketball team of the 1990s (all divisions) with a 266–26 (.908) record.

On January 27, 2007, UW-Platteville officially honored Ryan's 15-year tenure by naming the playing surface at Williams Fieldhouse "Bo Ryan Court". Ryan, along with the 2007 Wisconsin Badgers team, attended the event.

=== Wisconsin–Milwaukee (1999–2001) ===
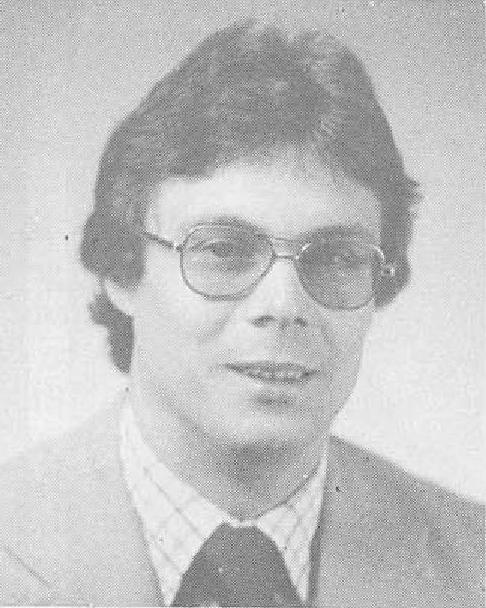
Ryan as an assistant for Wisconsin in 1977.

On the strength of his success at Platteville, Ryan was hired as head coach at the University of Wisconsin–Milwaukee for the 1999–2000 season. In his two seasons as coach, the team had its first back-to-back winning seasons in nearly a decade. Ryan also brought a 161 percent increase in home attendance at UWM, giving the program a new energy that continued into the tenure of his successor Bruce Pearl.

=== Wisconsin–Madison (2001–2015) ===
Following the Badgers' 2000 Final Four run, head coach Dick Bennett retired two games into the 2000–01 season. Assistant coach Brad Soderberg finished the season as interim head coach, but was not considered for the full-time job. The coaching search began to concentrate on Rick Majerus of the University of Utah (who was a Milwaukee native) and Bo Ryan. After Majerus pulled his name out of consideration, UW athletic director Pat Richter made the decision to hire Ryan as Wisconsin's 13th head coach.

Ryan's first season was much more successful than anticipated. The team was predicted to finish as low as ninth in the Big Ten in pre-season polls. The team, led by Kirk Penney, surprisingly finished in a four-way tie for the Big Ten regular-season title and received an invitation to the NCAA tournament. In the 2002–03 season, the Badgers won their first outright Big Ten regular season title in 56 years and advanced to the "Sweet Sixteen" in the NCAA Tournament. The Badgers won the Big Ten tournament Championship in 2004, led by Devin Harris, and once again received an NCAA Tournament invitation. In the 2004–05 season, Wisconsin advanced to the "Elite Eight" in the NCAA Tournament, losing to the eventual national champion North Carolina Tar Heels. On December 10, 2005, Ryan recorded his 100th victory as Wisconsin head coach by defeating in-state rival Marquette.

In the 2006–07 season, Ryan led the Badgers to the pinnacle of college basketball, helping them achieve their first top-five ranking and #1 ranking in the AP poll in the school's history. However, the Badgers' time atop the poll was short-lived as they lost their next game, against Michigan State before losing to Ohio State in a #1 vs. #2 matchup. The Wisconsin–Ohio State game on February 25, 2007, featured two teams ranked #1 in that week's national polls, with Ohio State securing the top ranking in the Coaches' Poll and clinching the regular season Big Ten title. The following week they rebounded with a 52–50 win at home over Michigan State and again defeated Michigan State in the Big Ten tournament, before losing the Big Ten tournament championship game to Ohio State. In 2007, Ryan was named the winner of the Clair Bee Coach of the Year Award. A year later, the Badgers notched their most wins ever in Big Ten play (16) en route to a school-record 31 wins.

On December 12, 2009, Ryan recorded his 200th victory as Wisconsin head coach by defeating in-state rival Marquette, 72–63 at the Kohl Center.

On January 24, 2010, Ryan recorded his 100th Big Ten Conference victory by defeating Penn State, 79–71 at the Kohl Center. With that victory, Ryan became the 2nd fastest coach to reach that milestone, tying Ryan with Branch McCracken who both needed 140 games to reach the 100th conference victory. The only coach to reach the 100th conference win faster was Bob Knight, who only needed 131 games.

On March 9, 2012, in the 2012 Big Ten Conference men's basketball tournament quarterfinals the Badgers defeated the Hoosiers, giving Ryan his 266th win at Wisconsin and vaulting him past Bud Foster to become the winningest coach in school history.

On December 4, 2013, Ryan won his 300th game at Wisconsin during a 48–38 victory over Virginia becoming only the ninth Big Ten head coach to win 300 games.

On March 14, 2014, Ryan got the 700th victory of his head-coaching career during an 83–57 win over Minnesota in the 2014 Big Ten tournament. On March 29, 2014, during the 2014 NCAA Division I men's basketball tournament, Ryan reached his first Division I Final Four with a 64–63 overtime win over Arizona.

On January 8, 2015, the Badgers defeated Purdue 62–55 giving Ryan his 159th Big Ten victory, passing Walter Meanwell for most Big Ten conference victories in UW history.

On February 14, 2015, Ryan was named a finalist to be considered for election in the Class of 2015 for the Naismith Memorial Basketball Hall of Fame.

On April 6, 2015, after losing the 2015 NCAA Championship game to Duke 68–63, Ryan's immediate post game interview with CBS' Tracy Wolfson implied that the officiating was the reason for his team's loss. For the game, Duke was called for 13 fouls while the Badgers were called for 15.

Ryan has written three books: Bo Ryan: Another Hill to Climb, The Swing Offense, and Passing and Catching: the Lost Art. He led the Badgers to the NCAA Tournament in each of his 14 full seasons at Wisconsin; the team had only been to a total of seven NCAA Tournaments before Ryan's arrival (three of them under Bennett). He also owns all four of Wisconsin's 30-win seasons.

He coached the Badgers to the NCAA Final Four two years in a row, falling to Kentucky, 74–73, in the 2014 semifinals in Arlington, Texas, and to Duke, 68–63, in the championship game on April 6, 2015, in Indianapolis.

On June 29, 2015, Ryan announced that he would retire after the 2015–16 season, naming associate head coach Greg Gard, who had been on Ryan's staff at both UW-Platteville and Milwaukee, as his preferred successor. A month and a half later, Ryan announced he was "not totally sure" whether or not he would retire. On December 15, 2015, Ryan announced his retirement after a win against Texas A&M–Corpus Christi, effective immediately, and Gard took over for the rest of the season.

== Personal life ==
Ryan and his wife, Kelly, have five children: Megan, Will, Matt, Brenna and Mairin. Ryan also has 10 grandchildren: Aoife, Imogen, Maeve, Owen, Liam, Callen, Roen, Remi, Finn and Ryan.

Shortly after the Badgers' loss in the 2015 NCAA title game, there was speculation Ryan would retire when he and his wife put their home in Madison up for sale. At a charity fundraiser, he explained that they had chosen to downsize now that their children were all adults and out of the house, and had bought a condo near the Badgers' home of the Kohl Center. The house was ultimately purchased by new Wisconsin football head coach Paul Chryst.

In 2016, Ryan admitted to having an affair with a massage therapist. An investigation ensued concerning whether Ryan improperly used school resources during the course of the tryst. He was eventually cleared.

== Head coaching record ==
Record table
Season	Team	Overall	Conference	Standing	Postseason
Wisconsin–Platteville Pioneers (Wisconsin Intercollegiate Athletic Conference) (1984–1999)
1984–85	Wisconsin–Platteville	9–17	4–12	7th	
1985–86	Wisconsin–Platteville	16–11	8–8	5th	NAIA First Round
1986–87	Wisconsin–Platteville	14–11	6–10	T–5th	
1987–88	Wisconsin–Platteville	24–5	14–2	1st	NAIA Third Round
1988–89	Wisconsin–Platteville	24–5	13–3	3rd	NAIA Third Round
1989–90	Wisconsin–Platteville	26–3	15–1	1st	NAIA Third Round
1990–91	Wisconsin–Platteville	28–3	13–3	2nd	NCAA Division III Champion
1991–92	Wisconsin–Platteville	27–4	13–3	2nd	NCAA Division III Third Place
1992–93	Wisconsin–Platteville	24–4	13–3	T–1st	NCAA Division III Elite Eight
1993–94	Wisconsin–Platteville	23–5	13–3	2nd	NCAA Division III Sweet 16
1994–95	Wisconsin–Platteville	31–0	16–0	1st	NCAA Division III Champion
1995–96	Wisconsin–Platteville	23–3	15–1	1st	NCAA Division III First Round
1996–97	Wisconsin–Platteville	24–3	14–2	1st	NCAA Division III Second Round
1997–98	Wisconsin–Platteville	30–0	16–0	1st	NCAA Division III Champion
1998–99	Wisconsin–Platteville	30–2	15–1	1st	NCAA Division III Champion
Wisconsin–Platteville:		353–76 (.823)	188–52 (.783)		
Milwaukee Panthers (Horizon League) (1999–2001)
1999–00	Milwaukee	15–14	6–8	T–4th	
2000–01	Milwaukee	15–13	7–7	5th	
Milwaukee:		30–27 (.526)	13–15 (.464)		
Wisconsin Badgers (Big Ten Conference) (2001–2015)
2001–02	Wisconsin	19–13	11–5	T–1st	NCAA Division I Round of 32
2002–03	Wisconsin	24–8	12–4	1st	NCAA Division I Sweet 16
2003–04	Wisconsin	25–7	12–4	T–2nd	NCAA Division I Round of 32
2004–05	Wisconsin	25–9	11–5	3rd	NCAA Division I Elite Eight
2005–06	Wisconsin	19–12	9–7	T–4th	NCAA Division I Round of 64
2006–07	Wisconsin	30–6	13–3	2nd	NCAA Division I Round of 32
2007–08	Wisconsin	31–5	16–2	1st	NCAA Division I Sweet 16
2008–09	Wisconsin	20–13	10–8	T–4th	NCAA Division I Round of 32
2009–10	Wisconsin	24–9	13–5	4th	NCAA Division I Round of 32
2010–11	Wisconsin	25–9	13–5	3rd	NCAA Division I Sweet 16
2011–12	Wisconsin	26–10	12–6	4th	NCAA Division I Sweet 16
2012–13	Wisconsin	23–12	12–6	T–4th	NCAA Division I Round of 64
2013–14	Wisconsin	30–8	12–6	T–2nd	NCAA Division I Final Four
2014–15	Wisconsin	36–4	16–2	1st	NCAA Division I Runner-up
2015–16	Wisconsin	7–5			
Wisconsin:		364–130 (.737)	172–68 (.717)		
Total:		747–233 (.762)			
National champion Postseason invitational champion Conference regular season champion Conference regular season and conference tournament champion Division regular season champion Division regular season and conference tournament champion Conference tournament champion

== See also ==
- List of college men's basketball coaches with 600 wins
- List of NCAA Division I men's basketball tournament Final Four appearances by coach
