= Felipe Lettersten =

Swedish sculptor (1957–2003)

- Born: June 11, 1957
- Died: November 11, 2003 (aged 46)
- Known for: Sculptor

Felipe Tomas Lettersten (1957–2003) was a Peruvian-born Swedish sculptor. Starting in 1986, Lettersten started preserving the Amazon rainforest cultures by casting sculptures of indigenous people. He wanted to educate the Western world on respecting Indian cultures. His cast sculptures are often placed on pedestals. Lettersten was known to makes three copies of a sculpture, sending one to the tribe as a gesture of respect, the second was sold and the third copy exhibited.

Lettersten's work Sons of Our Land features approximately 300 statues of various indigenous tribes of Peru, Brazil, Venezuela, and 76 of these statues are located at the Amazon Regional Museum (Museo Regional Amazónico) in Malecón Tarapaca, Iquitos Peru. In 2014, Lettersten had 19 life-sized bronze statues from the exhibition Sons of Our Land (Os Filhos da Nossa Terra) were shown at Cultural Centre of the Peoples of the Amazon (Centro Cultural dos Povos da Amazonia) in Manaus, State of Amazonas, Brazil. Museo de las Américas in San Juan, Puerto Rico has Lettersten's work in El Indio en América, an exhibition within the permanent collection featuring life-sized bronze and fiberglass statues of 22 different indigenous tribes.

== See also ==
- Edward S. Curtis, American photographer whose work focused on the American West and on Native American peoples.
- Jimmy Nelson, photojournalist and photographer known for his portraits of tribal and indigenous peoples.
- Adrien Voisin, American sculptor whose work focused on the Blackfeet people
- Photography by indigenous peoples of the Americas
- Salvage ethnography
