= Bill Cofield =

American basketball coach (1939–1983)

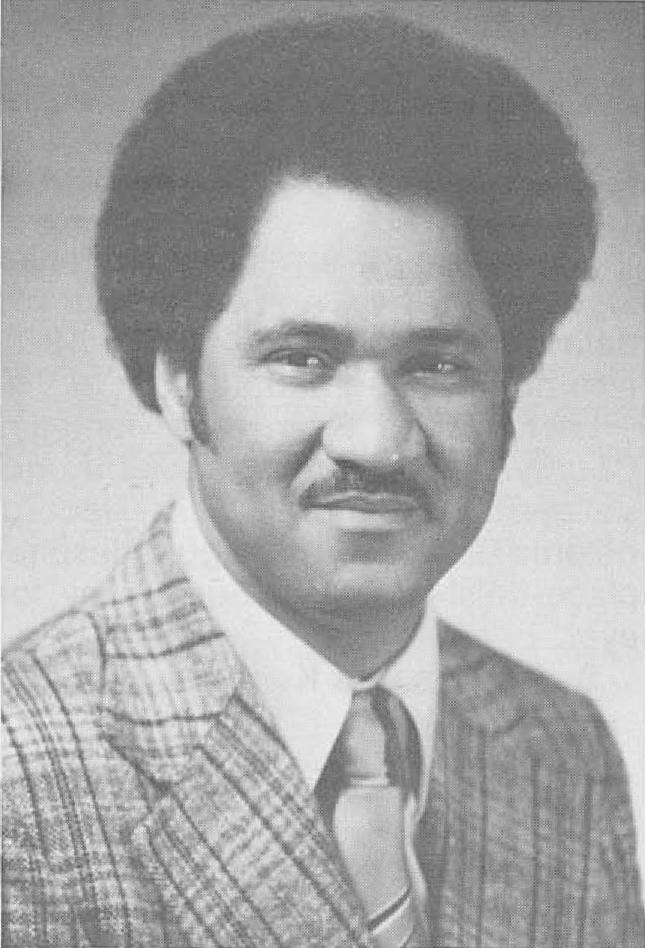
Cofield circa 1976

William Lawrence Cofield (September 21, 1939 – June 20, 1983) was an American basketball coach. He was the first black basketball head coach of a Big Ten Conference team, coaching Wisconsin from 1976 to 1982.

== Background ==
Cofield was born and raised in Carrier Mills, Illinois. He played college basketball at Casper Junior College in Casper, Wyoming and at McKendree University in Lebanon, Illinois, where he earned a Bachelor of Arts degree in physical education in 1963. He received a master's degree in physical education from the University of Kentucky in 1967.

== Career ==
Cofield's first coaching assignment was at H. E. Davis Junior High School in Cleveland, Ohio in 1963. After two years he was named to coach East Technical High School in Cleveland, as an assistant coach where the team went 20–1 in 1965–66.

Cofield's first year of collegiate coaching came at Kentucky State University, where he spent one year as an assistant before being named to head the Lincoln University of Pennsylvania team. His two-year record of 38–12 included two conference championships and NAIA playoff berths.

Cofield moved to Prairie View A&M University in Prairie View, Texas, where he posted a 57–48 record over four years. His 1972–73 squad went 19–8, placing second in the Southwestern Athletic Conference.

Cofield became the nation's first black athletic director and head coach at a predominantly white institution of higher learning by accepting both positions at the College of Racine in 1973. There, Cofield hired Bo Ryan as his assistant coach. Following a 14–15 season, the school closed. Cofield joined the University of Virginia staff, where he served as an assistant under head coach Terry Holland for two seasons.

Cofield signed a five-year contract to become the head coach at Wisconsin on March 16, 1976, succeeding John Powless who had resigned one month prior on February 11 during a Badgers' 14-game losing streak. He coached at Wisconsin for six seasons. His best team was his 1979–80 team, which posted a record of 15–14 and had future NBA players Wes Matthews and Claude Gregory on its roster.

Cofield is a member of the McKendree University Sports Hall of Fame. He died at age 43 from cancer in Madison, Wisconsin in 1983. He is buried at the Sunset Lawn Cemetery in Harrisburg, Illinois.

== Head coaching record ==
=== College ===
Record table
Season	Team	Overall	Conference	Standing	Postseason
Lincoln Lions () (1967–1969)
1967–68	Lincoln	19–3		1st	NAIA Participant
1968–69	Lincoln	19–9		1st	NAIA Participant
Lincoln:		38–12			
Prairie View A&M (Southwestern Athletic Conference) (1969–1973)
1969–70	Prairie View A&M	10–17			
1970–71	Prairie View A&M	14–12			
1971–72	Prairie View A&M	14–11			
1972–73	Prairie View A&M	19–8		2nd	
Prairie View A&M:		57–48			
Racine Lakers () (1973–1974)
1973–74	Racine	14–15			
Racine:		14–15			
Wisconsin Badgers (Big Ten Conference) (1976–1982)
1976–77	Wisconsin	11–16	7–11	T–7th	
1977–78	Wisconsin	8–19	4–14	T–9th	
1978–79	Wisconsin	12–15	6–12	T–8th	
1979–80	Wisconsin	15–14	7–11	8th	
1980–81	Wisconsin	11–16	5–13	9th	
1981–82	Wisconsin	6–21	3–15	10th	
Wisconsin:		63–101	32–76		
Total:		172–176			
National champion Postseason invitational champion Conference regular season champion Conference regular season and conference tournament champion Division regular season champion Division regular season and conference tournament champion Conference tournament champion
