= Saint Francis de Sales Seminary =

Catholic seminary in Milwaukee, Wisconsin

Coordinates: 42°58′49.1″N 87°51′55.3″W

- Motto: Vos estis sal terrae
- Motto in English: "You are the salt of the earth" (Matthew 5:13a)
- Type: Private; Seminary
- Established: 1845; 181 years ago
- Religious affiliation: Roman Catholic
- President: Most Reverend Jeffrey S. Grob
- Location: St. Francis nr Milwaukee, Wisconsin, United States
- Campus: Suburban
- Website: www.sfs.edu
- Henni Hall
- U.S. National Register of Historic Places
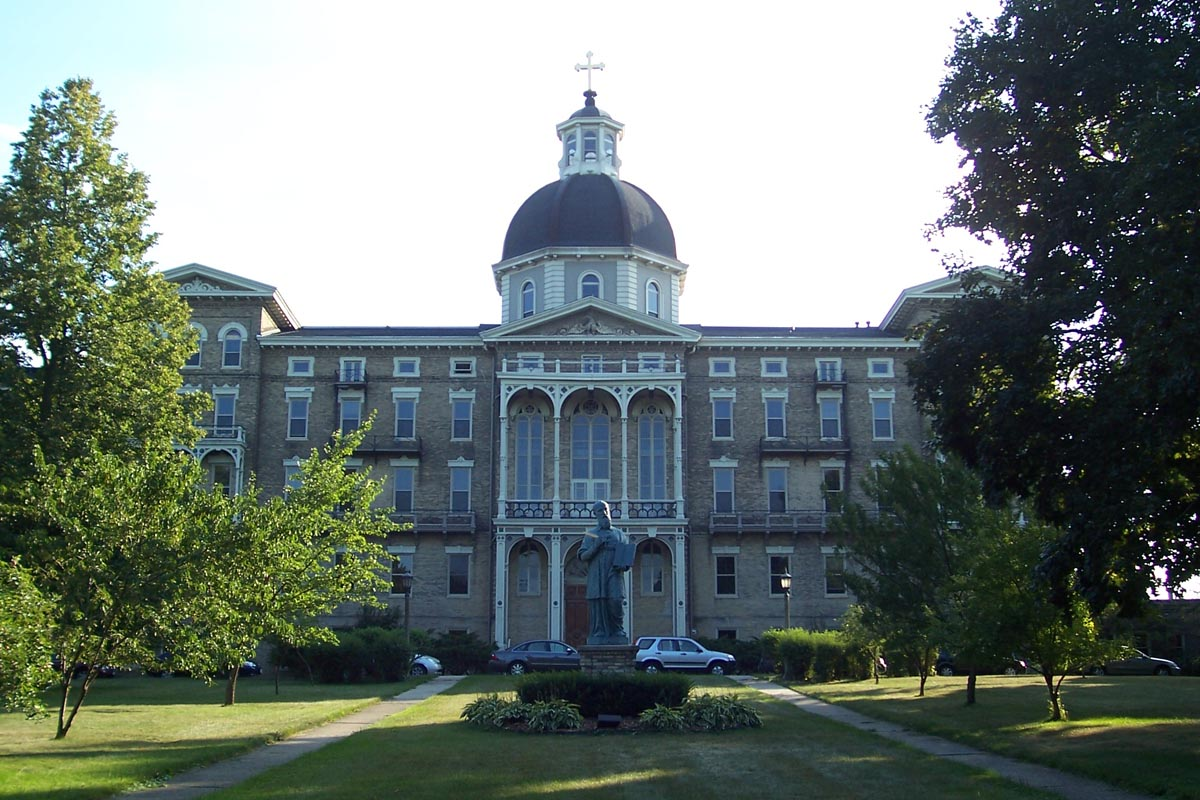
- Henni Hall
- Location: 3257 S. Lake Dr. St. Francis, Wisconsin
- Architect: Victor Schulte
- NRHP reference No.: 74000103
- Added to NRHP: July 24, 1974

Saint Francis de Sales Seminary is a seminary for the Roman Catholic Archdiocese of Milwaukee, located in the Milwaukee suburb of St. Francis, Wisconsin. On August 28, 2022, Very Reverend Luke N. Strand was installed as the 20th rector of the seminary by Most Reverend Jerome E. Listecki. Its main building, called Henni Hall, is listed on the National Register of Historic Places.

== Dedication ==
The seminary was dedicated to Francis de Sales, seventeenth-century Bishop and saint of the Roman Catholic Church.

== History ==
The seminary was founded in 1845 in the home of Archbishop John Henni, two years after the Archdiocese was established in Milwaukee. It is one of the original Roman Catholic seminaries in the United States and the oldest in continuous existence. It was founded to meet the demand for German-speaking priests in the Wisconsin Territory.

Henni Hall was dedicated on January 29, 1856 after a new location was chosen for the seminary along the south shore of Lake Township. The building was 4.5 stories tall, Italianate-styled, with a U-shaped floor plan. The gingerbread ornamentation was added at a later date. It was expanded in 1868 and again in 1875, and later renovated in 1989. Christ King Chapel within Henni Hall was consecrated in June 1861 by Archbishop Henni. Archbishop Michael Heiss and Fr. Joseph Salzmann, the first two rectors, are buried beneath the chapel. The seminary's Salzmann Library was erected in 1908 and now contains more than 89,000 volumes. The Miller Gymnasium, a gift from the estate of Ernest G. Miller, was dedicated in 1927.

In late 2024, the seminary launched a $75 million capital campaign titled "Zeal for the Lord's House" to fund a comprehensive campus restoration. The project involves major infrastructure and structural repairs to Henni Hall, including the restoration of its dome and roof. Additionally, Kiley Hall is being renovated to serve as a new formation center with a 250-seat lecture hall. Due to the scale of the construction, the seminary's students moved to temporary quarters at the nearby Mary Mother of the Church Pastoral Center in early 2025, with an expected return to the main campus in late 2026.

Over the past 170 years, Saint Francis de Sales Seminary has graduated over 4,000 priests and over 400 deacons and lay ministers. Until 1941, it had included a minor seminary component, but in that year those students were merged with the students at Pio Nino High School to form the new St. Francis de Sales Preparatory Seminary. Since 2006, the seminary once again focuses solely on priestly formation.

Church land accounts for a significant portion of the City of St. Francis. On the grounds of Saint Francis de Sales Seminary is a large undeveloped area known as the Seminary Woods which hosts a small cemetery and grotto honoring Our Lady of Lourdes. Archbishop Frederick Xavier Katzer is also buried here.

Forty-nine tall maple trees line the long road that leads up to Saint Francis de Sales Seminary. Planted by Austrian immigrant Siegfried Wegerbauer in the 1930s, their canopy now forms cathedral arches shading the path.

== Our Lady of Lourdes Grotto ==
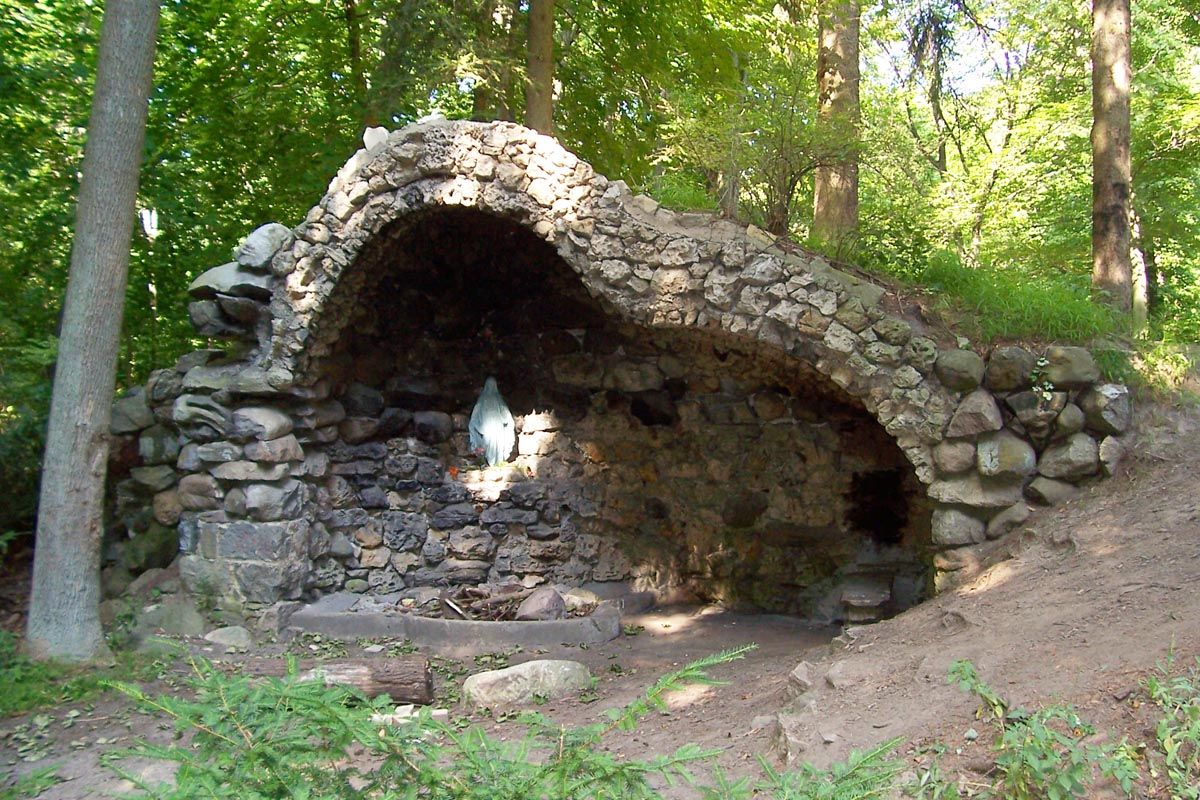
Our Lady of Lourdes Grotto

The Our Lady of Lourdes Grotto was built by German born Paul Dobberstein while training at the seminary in 1894. During his studies he contracted double pneumonia and promised the Blessed Virgin Mary he would build a grotto in her honor, once he recovered. This monument can be found in Saint Francis de Sales Seminary's wooded area. It is free for anyone to view.

Standing a mere ten feet tall, this grotto was Dobberstein's first attempt at grotto building. He used the knowledge and skills gained during its construction to build other grottos in Wisconsin and Iowa, including the massive Grotto of the Redemption found in West Bend, Iowa. It is believed to have inspired Mathias Wernerus (who also attended Saint Francis de Sales Seminary) to build the Dickeyville Grotto in Dickeyville, Wisconsin in 1930 and started the grotto building movement in America.

== Notable alumni ==
- Dismas Becker – Wisconsin legislator and civil rights activist
- Fabian Bruskewitz – Bishop of the Roman Catholic Diocese of Lincoln
- Solanus Casey – beatified priest
- Edward Joseph Dunne – Bishop of the Roman Catholic Diocese of Dallas
- Mariano Simon Garriga – Bishop of the Roman Catholic Diocese of Corpus Christi
- Augustus F. Gearhard – Deputy Chief of Chaplains of the U.S. Air Force
- Daniel Mary Gorman – Bishop of the Roman Catholic Diocese of Boise
- James Groppi – Civil rights leader, Roman Catholic Archdiocese of Milwaukee
- Francis J. Haas – Bishop of the Roman Catholic Diocese of Grand Rapids
- Jeffrey Haines – Auxiliary Bishop of the Roman Catholic Archdiocese of Milwaukee
- James Michael Harvey – Cardinal
- John Joseph Hennessy – Bishop of the Roman Catholic Diocese of Wichita
- Donald J. Hying – Bishop of the Roman Catholic Diocese of Madison
- Francis Johannes – Bishop of the Roman Catholic Diocese of Leavenworth
- Frederick Katzer – Bishop of the Roman Catholic Diocese of Green Bay
- Bernard B. Kroenke – Wisconsin legislator
- John Jeremiah Lawler – Bishop of the Roman Catholic Diocese of Rapid City
- Francis Peter Leipzig – Bishop of the Roman Catholic Diocese of Baker
- Thomas Mathias Lenihan – Bishop of the Roman Catholic Diocese of Cheyenne
- Joseph Patrick Lynch – Bishop of the Roman Catholic Diocese of Dallas
- Aloisius Joseph Muench – Cardinal
- Thomas Lawrence Noa – Bishop of the Roman Catholic Diocese of Marquette
- Joseph Perry – Auxiliary Bishop of Roman Catholic Archdiocese of Chicago
- Paul Peter Rhode – Bishop of the Roman Catholic Diocese of Green Bay
- Vincent James Ryan – Bishop of the Roman Catholic Diocese of Bismarck
- James T. Schuerman – Auxiliary Bishop of the Roman Catholic Archdiocese of Milwaukee.
- Augustine Francis Schinner – Bishop of the Roman Catholic Diocese of Superior
- Thomas Seery – Wisconsin legislator
- Richard J. Sklba – Auxiliary Bishop of the Roman Catholic Archdiocese of Milwaukee
- Paul Francis Tanner – Bishop of the Roman Catholic Diocese of St. Augustine
- John Henry Tihen – Bishop of the Roman Catholic Archdiocese of Denver
- Charles Daniel White – Bishop of the Roman Catholic Diocese of Spokane
- Paul Ssemogerere - Bishop of the Roman Catholic Diocese of Kasana-Luweero, in Uganda
