= Seminary Woods St. Francis =

Forest in Wisconsin

Seminary Woods
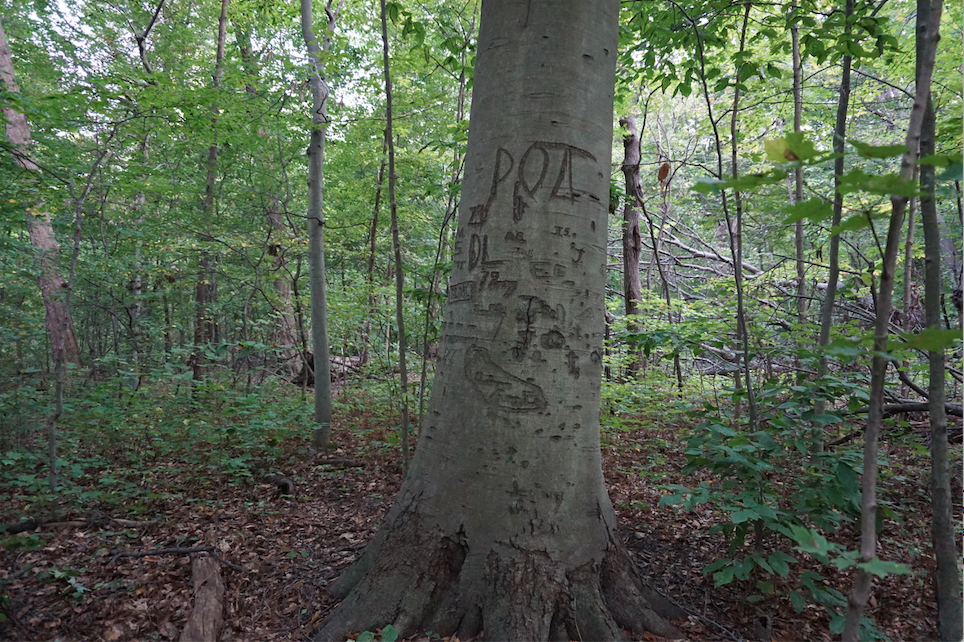
- One of the beech trees located in Seminary Woods with vandalism etched along its trunk. (St.Francis, Wisconsin)
- Interactive map of Seminary Woods
- Location: Saint Francis de Sales Seminary
- Nearest city: St. Francis, Wisconsin, US
- Coordinates: 42.982°N 87.8711°W
- Area: 68 acres (28 hectares)
- Created: 1855
- Operator: Saint Francis de Sales Seminary
- Website: http://www.mkeconservancy.org/seminary-woods.html

Seminary Woods is a historic woodland in St. Francis, Wisconsin, United States, on the grounds of Saint Francis de Sales Seminary. It is one of the last surviving beech-maple mesic forests in Wisconsin. The forest was founded in 1855 when the seminary moved to St. Francis from Milwaukee and the land that was originally purchased by the Lake Drive Franciscan Sisters became part of the newly established seminary. The forest consists of 68 acres (28 hectares) and is located near Lake Michigan. It attracts attention from naturalists for the forest's beech-maple composition and wild flowers that bloom in the spring. A striking feature of the forest is the seminary's cemetery that lies hidden among the trees at the center.

== History ==
In 1833, the Sisters of St. Francis of Assisi acquired the forest from members of the Indigenous Potawatomi tribe who were living in the area at the time. The woods would later become part of a seminary.

Two decades later, in 1855, the Saint Francis de Sales Seminary was built, and the forest owned by the Sisters became part of its property.

The forest has survived colonization and urbanization because its natural beauty led it to be used as a place for reflection by members of the seminary.

== Natural history ==
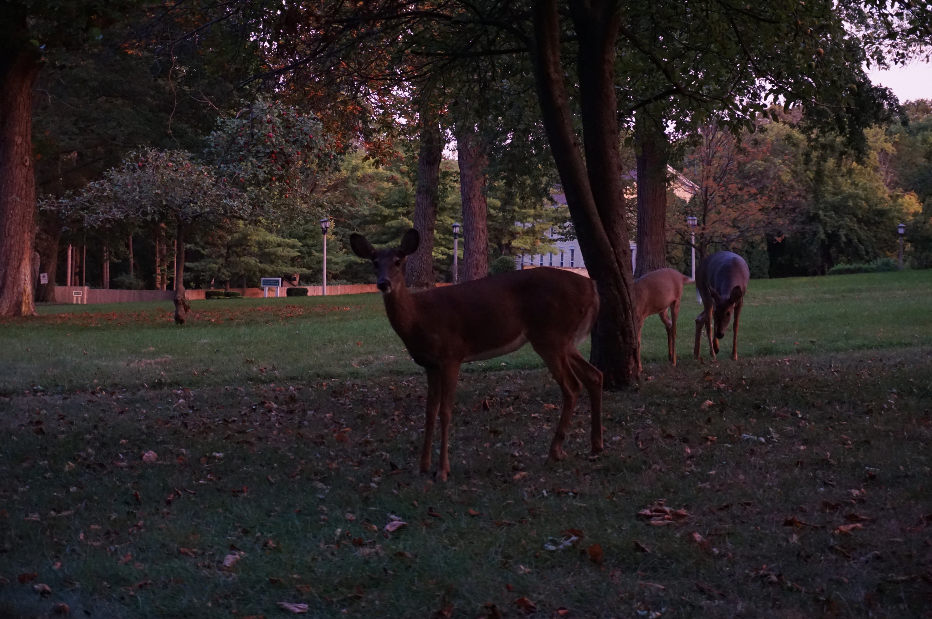
Deer in front of the Saint Francis de Sale Seminary. These deer live within Seminary Woods.

The forest obtained its distinct beech-maple forest from soil deposits made by glacial movement 11,000 years ago. Several species of wildflowers, wildlife, and trees are spotted in the forest. Mature trees found in the forest include basswood, sugar maple, beech, red oak, and paper birch. The forest also has a small stream that flows into nearby Lake Michigan. Wildflowers include trillium, white trout lily, yellow trout lily, bloodroot, the endangered blue stemmed goldenrod, and hepatica. Wildlife found in the area include great horned owls, white tailed deer, coyotes, and migratory birds.

Trees
Common name	Scientific name
American beech	Fagus grandifolia
American basswood	Tilia americana
Sugar maple	Acer saccharum
Red oak	Quercus rubra
Paper birch	Betula papyrifera

Fauna
Common name	Scientific name
Great horned owl	Bubo virginianus
White-tailed deer	Odocoileus virginianus

Plants
Common name	Scientific name
Tri flower	Trillium sp.
White trout lily	Erythronium albidum
Yellow trout lily	Erythronium americanum
Hepatica or liverwort	Hepatica sp.
Bloodroot	Sanguinaria sp.
Blue-stemmed goldenrod	Solidago caesia

== Invasive species ==
The Wisconsin Department of Natural Resources has declared Seminary Woods an area in need of protection from invasive species because of its natural environment and historical significance.

Although the forest does contain invasive species, they are low in number.

Invasive species
Common name	Scientific name
Common buckthorn	Rhamnus cathartica
Garlic mustard	Alliaria petiolata
Bell's honeysuckle	Lonicera × bella

== Structural remains ==
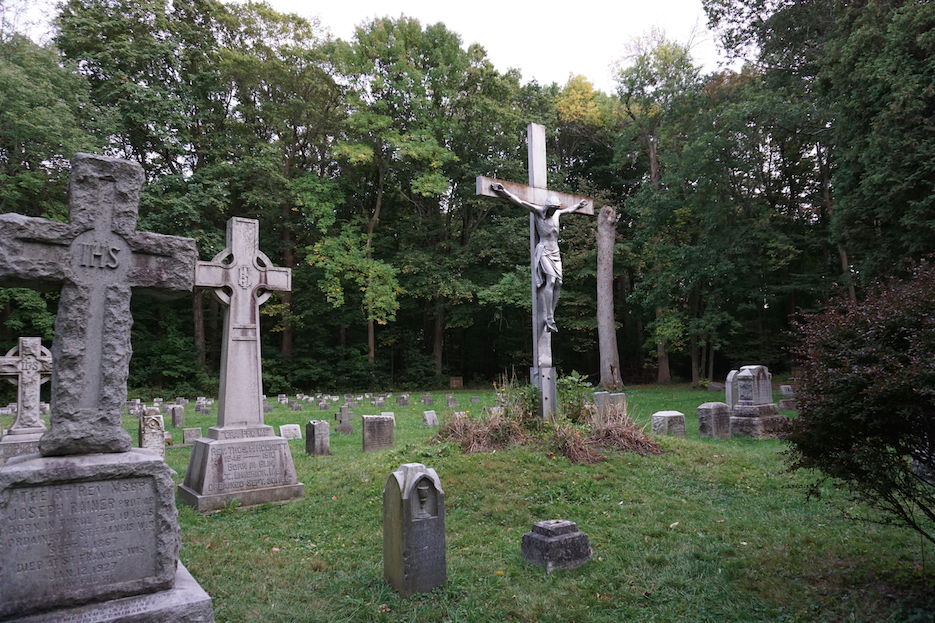
Seminary cemetery.

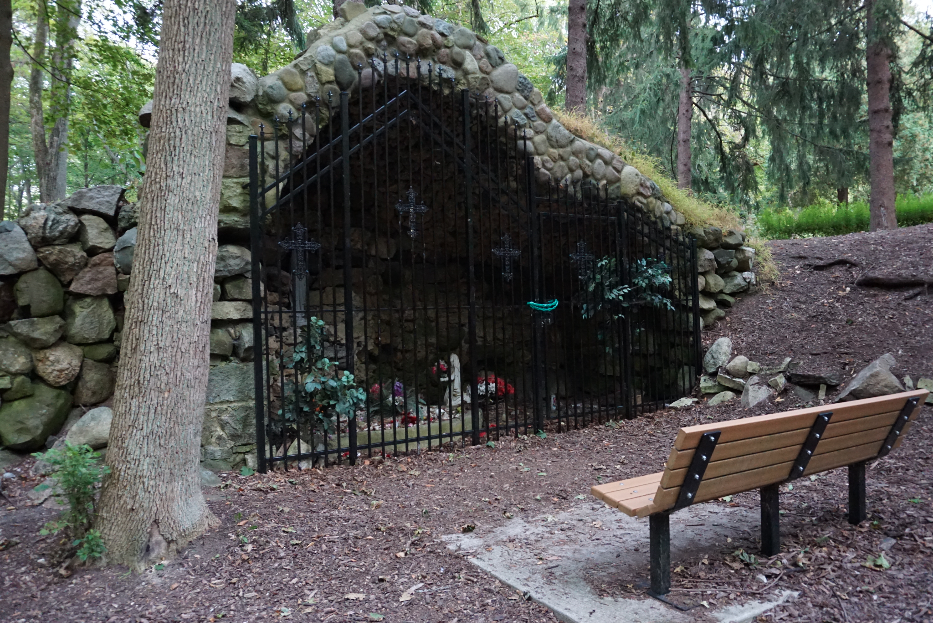
Our Lady of Lourdes Grotto.

The forest has the remains of previous structures, a grotto, and a cemetery that is the final resting place for individuals who were affiliated with the seminary.

=== Seminary cemetery ===
The cemetery is located towards the middle of the forest. Multiple pathways within the forest lead to the cemetery. The cemetery contains burials of sisters of St. Francis, archbishops, and children from St. Aemilian's orphanage.

=== Our Lady of Lourdes Grotto ===
The 10-foot (3 m) grotto found in the forest near the cemetery honors Our Lady of Lourdes and was built in 1894 by Paul Dobberstein.
