= Dickeyville =

Dickeyville may refer to a place in the United States:

- Dickeyville, Indiana, an unincorporated community
- Dickeyville, Wisconsin, a village in Wisconsin
  - Dickeyville Grotto, a shrine and grotto in Wisconsin
- Dickeyville Historic District, a historic district in Baltimore, Maryland
