= Grotto of the Redemption =

- The Shrine of the Grotto of the Redemption
- U.S. National Register of Historic Places
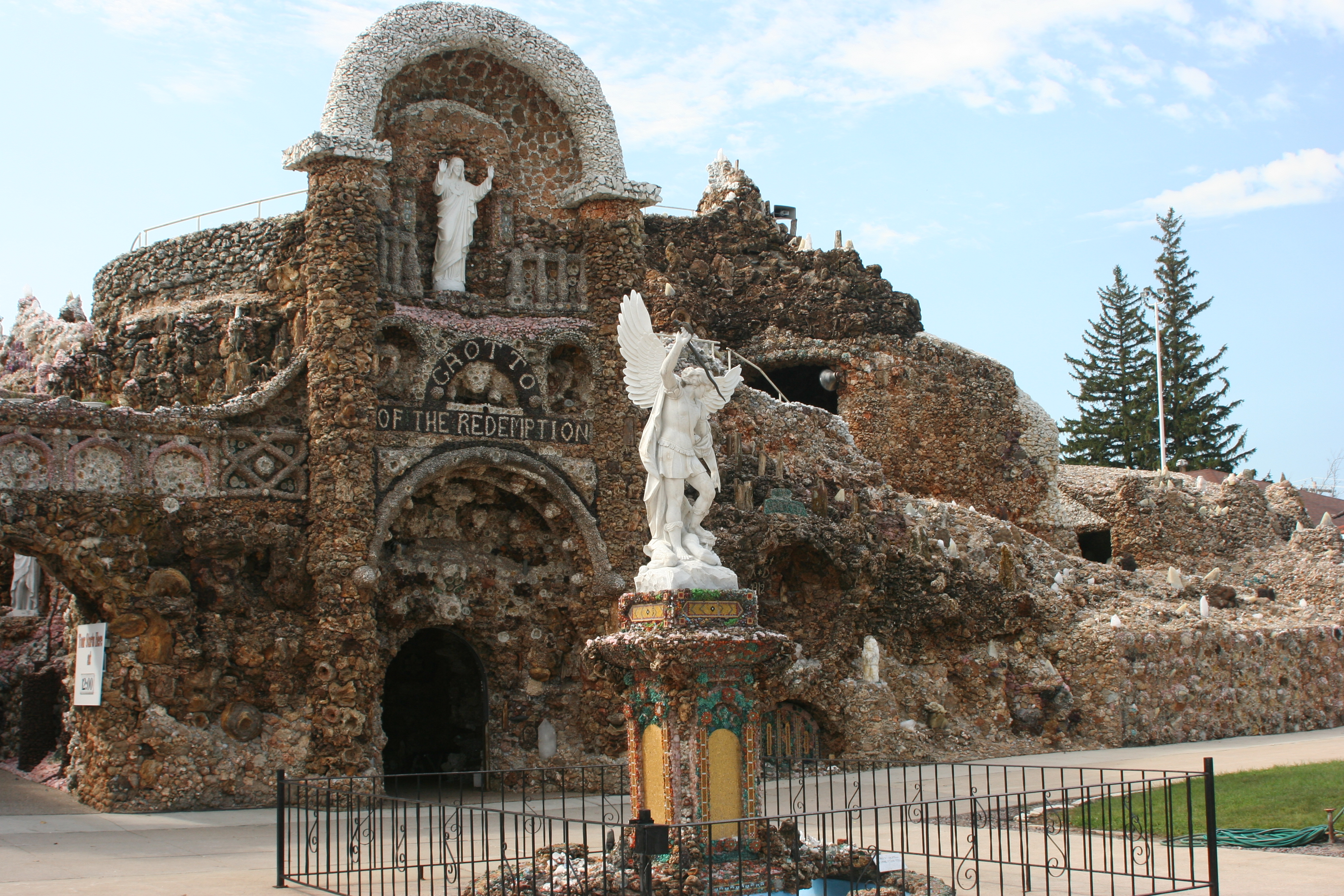
- The main entrance on the north side of the Grotto of the Redemption

- Location within Iowa Location within the United States
- Location: 300 N. Broadway; West Bend, Iowa
- Coordinates: 42°57′50″N 94°26′44″W
- Architect: Paul Dobberstein; Father Paul Matthias
- Architectural style: Landscape Architicture
- NRHP reference No.: 00001679
- Added to NRHP: February 23, 2001

The Shrine of the Grotto of the Redemption is a religious shrine in West Bend, Iowa, in the Roman Catholic Diocese of Sioux City. A conglomeration of nine grottos depicting scenes in the life of Jesus, it contains a large collection of minerals and petrifications and is believed to be the largest grotto of its kind.

It is also "considered to be the world's most complete man-made collection of minerals, fossils, shells, and petrifications in one place." The estimated value of the rocks and minerals which make up the Grotto is over $4,308,000. Over 100,000 people visit each year.

It includes a museum with precious and semiprecious stones from throughout the world, and photos and artifacts about the construction of the shrine.

== History ==
Father Paul Dobberstein was a German immigrant ordained in 1897. He became critically ill with pneumonia and promised to build a shrine to the Virgin Mary if she interceded for him. After his recovery, he began stockpiling rocks and precious stones. Construction of the Grotto began in 1912 and continued year round for 42 years.

Father Dobberstein used the knowledge and skills gained during construction of his first grotto honoring Our Lady of Lourdes while training at St. Francis Seminary in St. Francis, Wisconsin. His method was to set fancy rocks and gems into concrete. In 1946, Father Louis Greving began helping Dobberstein with the construction. The Grotto covered an area the size of a city block when Dobberstein died in 1954. Matt Szerensce helped contribute the work until his retirement in 1959. The Grotto was maintained by Deacon Gerald Streit from 1994 until his retirement in the early 2000s.

Father Dobberstein's works inspired Mathias Wernerus (who also attended St. Francis Seminary) to build the Dickeyville Grotto in Dickeyville, Wisconsin, in 1930, starting the grotto-building movement in America.

On August 1, 2015, the Grotto was raised to the status of a diocesan shrine by R. Walker Nickless, Bishop of Sioux City, becoming the diocese's first designated religious shrine.

== In popular culture ==
The Grotto of the Redemption is featured in the David Lynch film The Straight Story.

== Gallery ==
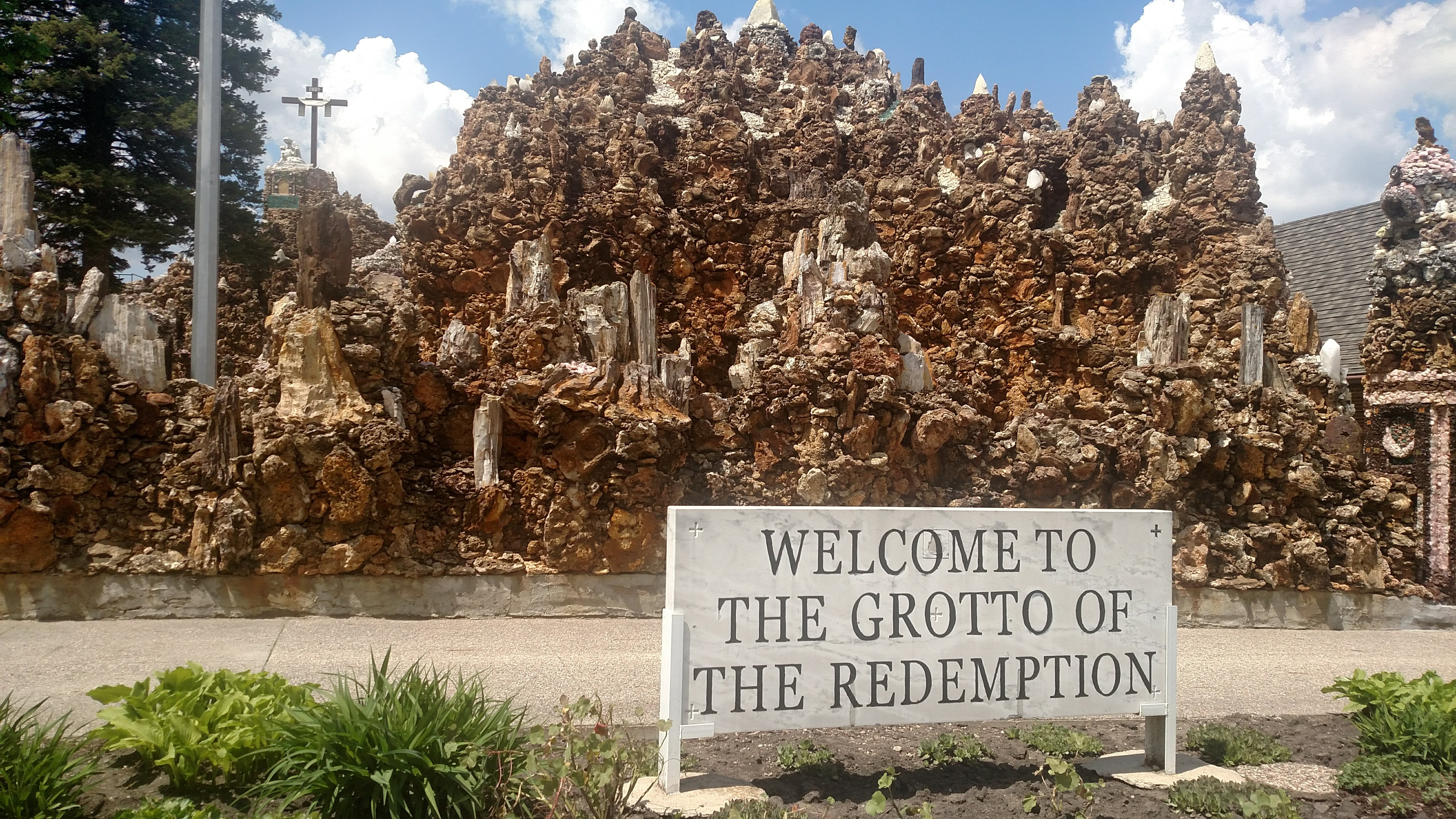
Entrance sign

View of Lower Arcade: Small Stations of the Cross

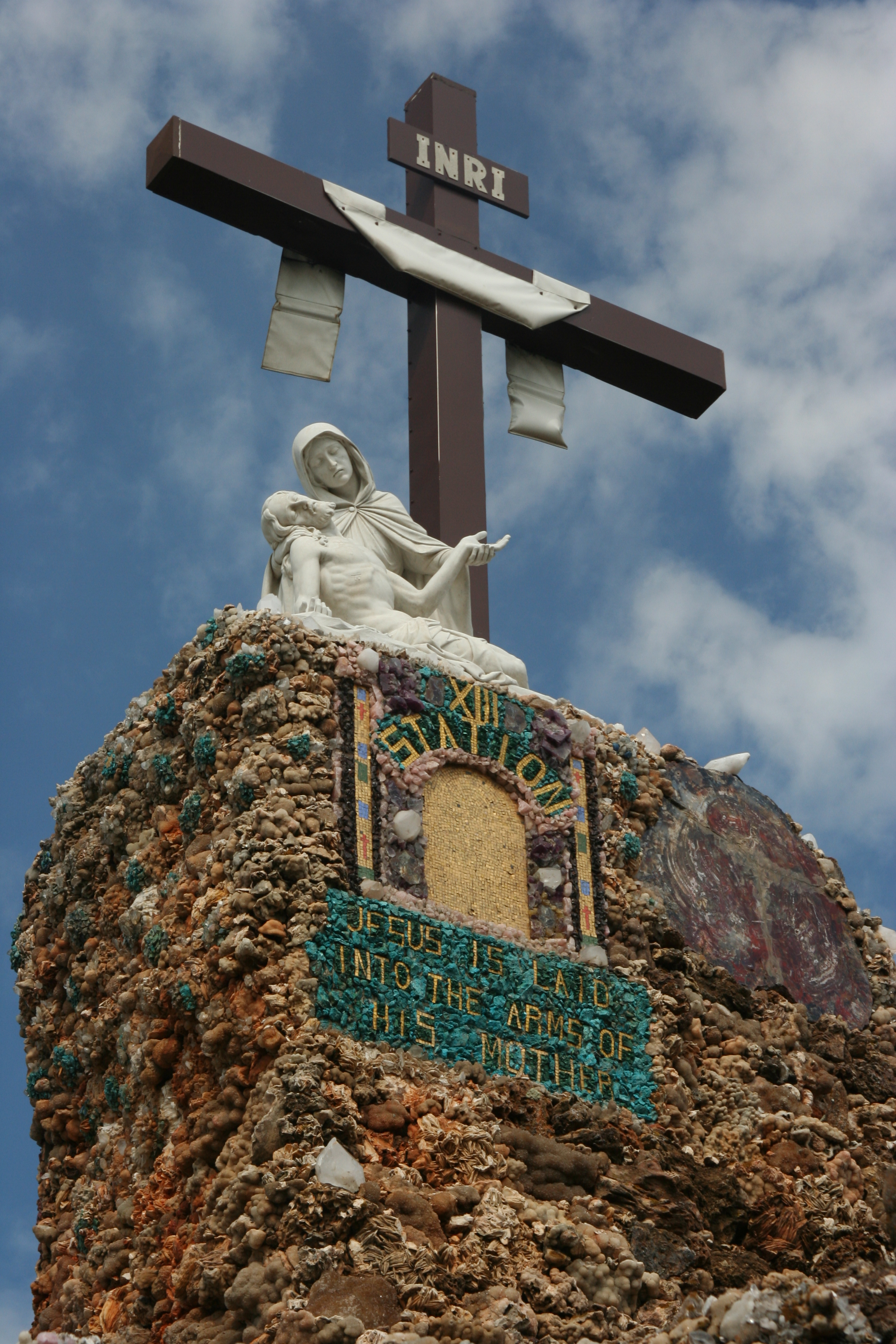
Station 13

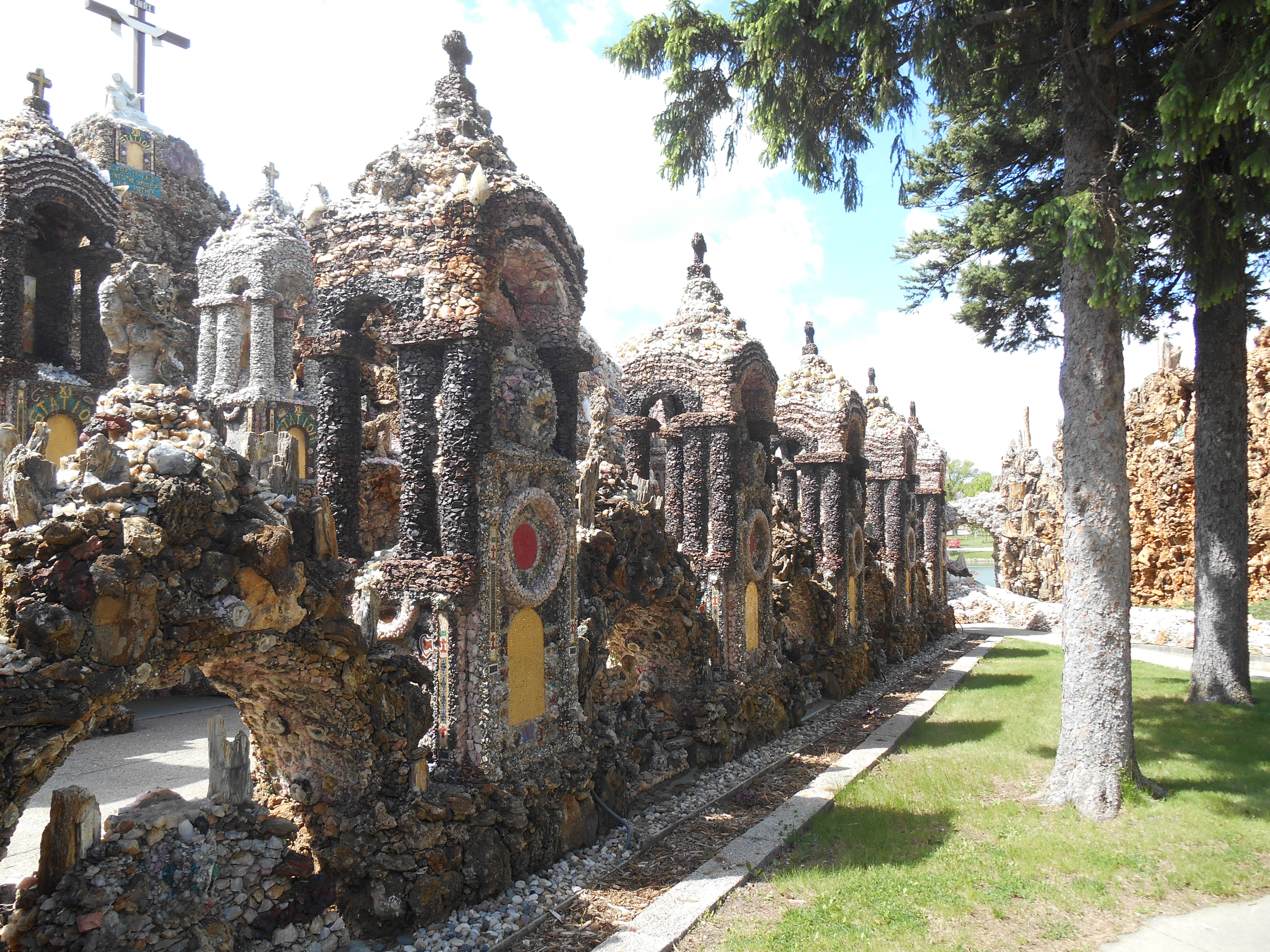

== See also ==
- Our Mother of Sorrows Grotto Historic District in Cedar Rapids, Iowa
