= Butter Braid =

Danish pastry maker

Butter Braid is a registered trademark of Country Maid, Inc., an American maker of Danish pastry products. The pastry is made with buttery dough folded into a braid pattern, then filled with fruit and other cream fillings. An icing packet or marinara packet is included with the frozen pastry.

Butter Braid brand pastries have been sold by fundraising dealerships in the fundraising industry since 1991. They are not currently sold in retail.

Butter Braid pastries are manufactured in an automated, SQF-Certified facility.

== History ==
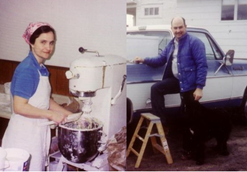
Ken and Marlene Banwart, founders of Country Maid, Inc. and Butter Braid pastries

These braided pastries were first sold at a farmer's market in West Bend, Iowa by Ken and Marlene Banwart. In the winter of 1990, the week before Christmas, the Banwarts received 60 calls from people who wanted to purchase their braided pastries. As demand for the product grew, the Banwarts began to freeze their pastries and let them rise overnight instead of baking them fresh every day.

In May 1991, Ken and Marlene created the Butter Braid brand name for their braided pastries and formed the company, Country Maid, Inc. Butter Braid pastries were then produced and marketed on a larger scale. It was also at this time that they began incorporating various fillings into the pastry.

Butter Braid braided pastries are still produced by Country Maid, Inc. in West Bend, Iowa.

== Fundraising ==
In 2002, the decision was made to remove Butter Braid pastry products from retail stores. The company decided to make the Butter Braid pastries a fundraising-only brand. Butter Braid pastry fundraisers feature high per-item profit, short turnaround time, and online ordering.

Since 1991, Butter Braid pastry products have helped raise over $267 million for nonprofits across the United States. The fundraising brand works with more than 15,000 fundraisers a year.

Butter Braid fundraising began selling online through My Fundraising Place in 2019. More than 4,000 fundraisers ran through the platform in its first year of operation.

Butter Braid brand products are represented by over 75 independent dealers across the United States. Each dealer services an exclusive territory and carries a unique product and flavor lineup.

== Pastry products ==
The frozen pastries are made with yeast, granulated sugar, pastry flour, eggs, water, and butter. Though Butter Braid pastries were originally made solely from pastry dough, many different fillings have been incorporated into the product over the years.

The pastries are kept frozen until they are ready to be baked. The freezing process preserves the yeast. When set out to thaw, the pastry rises significantly. This causes the braided profile to expand the layers of dough to separate and become flaky when baked.

=== Flavors ===
As of 2020, the flavors of pastries produced include:

- Apple with white icing
- Bavarian Creme with chocolate icing
- Blueberry & Cream Cheese with white icing
- Cherry with white icing
- Cinnamon with white icing
- Cream Cheese with white icing
- Four Cheese & Herb with marinara sauce
- Raspberry with white icing
- Strawberry & Cream Cheese with white icing

They also currently produce 2 flavors of pastry rolls:

- Caramel Rolls with caramel glaze
- Cinnamon Rolls with cream cheese icing

Retired flavors include:

- Double Chocolate with white icing

== Brand Information ==
The Butter Braid brand underwent a refresh in 2019, with updates being made to its packaging.

The brand's tagline is "Share the Good." This references the brand's decision to make their products available through fundraisers in order to help others raise money for various causes.

== Television ==
Butter Braid pastries and their parent company were featured on Discovery Channel's program "How It's Made." The braided pastry segment was aired on the Science Channel on November 21, 2014 at 8 p.m. CST. Country Maid was selected as a filming destination after making contact with the show's producers. "How It's Made" was looking to fill their production schedule for early 2014 with Iowa companies that produced some of the "most interesting things." The episode on Butter Braid pastries revealed the production process for manufacturing pastries.

The braided pastries were also showcased on "Manufacturing Marvels" on The Fox Business Network. Country Maid was showcased on Tuesday, September 22, 2015. The show documented the production process for the Butter Braid pastry, and the dealership opportunity the company offers.
