= Our Mother of Sorrows Grotto Historic District =

Historic district in Iowa, United States

- Our Mother of Sorrows Grotto; Historic District
- U.S. National Register of Historic Places
- U.S. Historic district
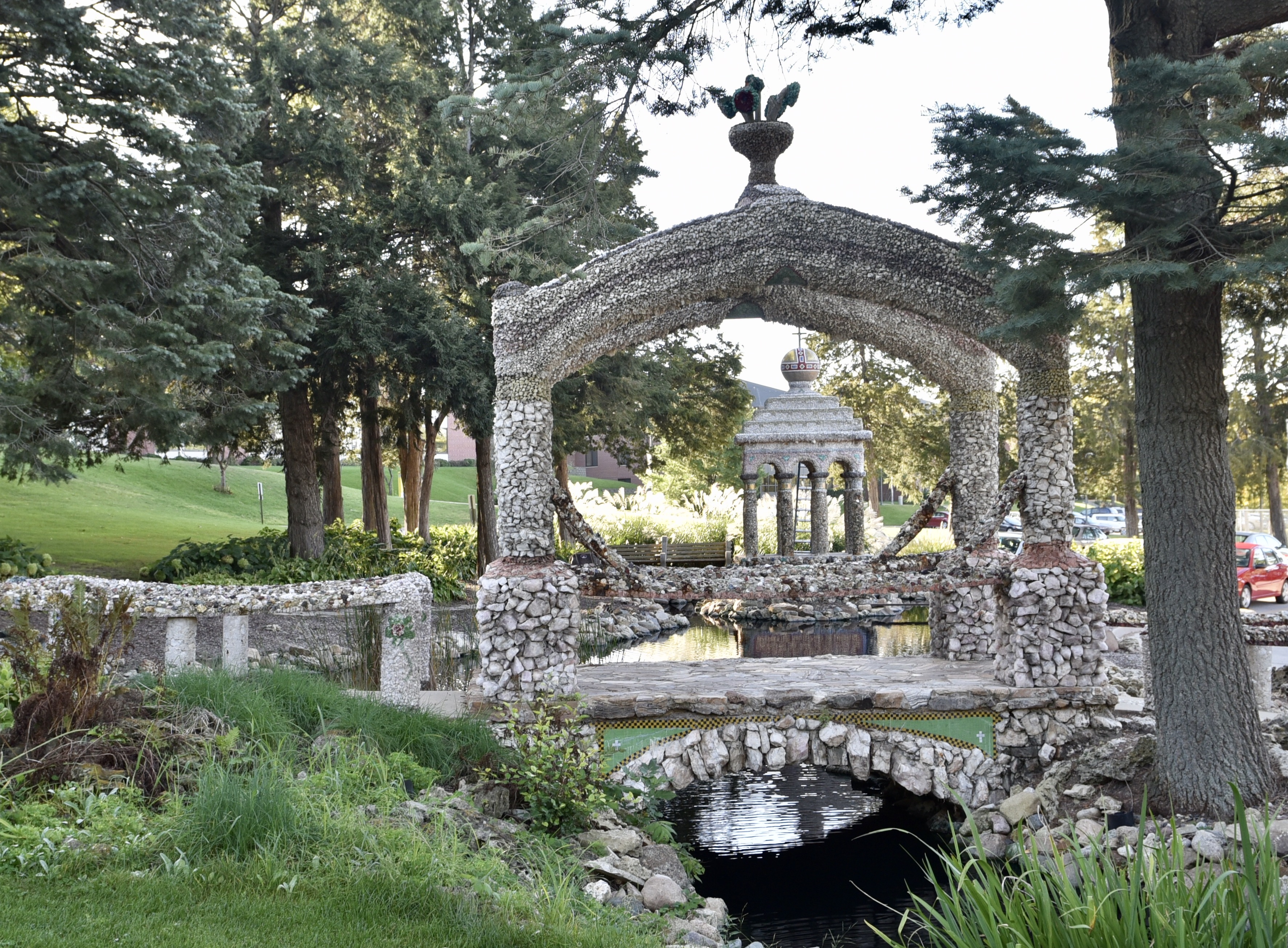

- Location within Iowa Location within the United States
- Location: 1330 Elmhurst Dr., NE; Cedar Rapids, Iowa
- Coordinates: 42°00′10″N 91°39′12″W
- Built: 1929-1941
- Architect: William H. Lightner
- NRHP reference No.: 14000213
- Added to NRHP: January 21, 2015

Our Mother of Sorrows Grotto Historic District is a nationally recognized historic district located on the Mount Mercy University campus in Cedar Rapids, Iowa, United States. It was listed on the National Register of Historic Places in 2015. It consists of a lagoon and five structures dedicated to the Virgin Mary. They include two arched entryways, a bridge, a ten-column structure representing the Ten Commandments, and a canopy enclosing a marble statue of the Virgin Mary. It was built by William H. Lightner, a self-trained architect, between 1929 and 1941. He utilized 12 tons of stone and 300 varieties of Italian mosaic glass that he acquired in his travels of more than 40,000 miles (64,000 km).

Popular in southern Europe, grottoes are natural or artificial caves that are places of spiritual reflection. In the United States, they are found primarily in the Midwest, and are created mostly by self-trained artists and builders.

When Lightner died in 1968, the Grotto fell into disrepair. Grants from the Smithsonian Institution’s American Heritage Preservation Project-Save Outdoor Sculpture (2001), the Iowa Arts Council (2011), and The National Endowment for the Arts (2014) were used to restore the structures. The Grotto is used for a variety of personal and communal events.

== See also ==
- Grotto of the Redemption in West Bend, Iowa
