= Mollie Jenson =

American sculptor

Coordinates: 44°52′10.57″N 92°26′39.97″W

Mollie Jenson (1890-1973) was an American sculptor from River Falls, Wisconsin. She was the creator of a series of folk art sculptures known collectively as Mollie Jenson’s Art Exhibit (also known as Mollie Jenson’s Zoo & Museum). Her work is an example of outsider art and vernacular architecture.

== Biography ==
Mollie Nelson was born in 1890, the daughter of a Norwegian farmer. She inherited her father's farm near River Falls, and lived there until 1959. She married Obert Jenson in 1911, and was the mother of six children. Her early artwork consisted of traditional craft items, including hooked rugs, quilts, paintings, horn furniture, and wood carvings.

Jenson completed her first outdoor sculpture, the ten-foot tall Dutch Windmill, in 1940. The Windmill was constructed of concrete embellished with tile mosaics, topped with electric lights and a blackface lawn jockey. Jenson’s 1941 Fireplace began as an outdoor hearth made of concrete, limestone, and ceramic pieces. Through continual additions, she expanded the structure into a cavern-like, elaborately decorated covered patio. Her last large-scale work was the Horseshoe, a diorama inspired by the Patriotism Shrine at nearby Dickeyville Grotto. The Horseshoe consisted of a semi-circular stone wall, decorated with curving concrete spires and deer antlers.

From 1938 to 1959, Jenson also operated a roadside zoo featuring 150 animals, including monkeys, peacocks, a lion, and a retired circus bear.

Following Jenson’s death, family members concerned with the safety of the structures demolished all but the Dutch Windmill.

== See also ==
- Dickeyville Grotto
- Paul Dobberstein
- Grandma Prisbrey's Bottle Village
