= St. Francis High School (St. Francis, Wisconsin) =

Location
- 4225 S. Lake Drive; St. Francis, WI; United States; 42°58′03.6″N 87°51′12.7″W

Information
- Type: Public Secondary
- Motto: "Jog it Up!"
- Established: 1962
- School district: Saint Francis School District
- Principal: Michael Lewandowski
- Teaching staff: 31.05 (FTE)
- Grades: 9–12
- Enrollment: 554 (2023–2024)
- Student to teacher ratio: 17.84
- Colors: Scarlet and white
- Mascot: Manny Mariner
- Yearbook: The Log
- Website: http://www.stfrancisschools.org

St. Francis High School is a public high school in St. Francis, Wisconsin serving grades 9 through 12. It is located along Lake Michigan. SFHS is the only high school in the Saint Francis School District.

== Academics ==
Classes available to St. Francis students include: English, mathematics, social studies, science, Spanish, music, art, business, health and physical education, technology education, school-to-work, and special education.

== Athletics ==
St. Francis High School was a junior varsity member of the now-defunct Braveland Conference for their inaugural school year, 1962-1963. When that conference split along geographic lines, the Mariners became charter members of the Parkland Conference for their first varsity season, along with all of the other Braveland schools south of I-94. They were the only school to stay in the Parkland Conference for its entire existence. When the Parkland dissolved following the 2005-2006 season, SFHS joined the Woodland Conference and was a member (of the Eastern Division). In 2014, St. Francis moved to the Midwest Classic Conference, their current home for interscholastic competition.

St. Francis High School's sports include: baseball, basketball, cross country, football, golf, soccer, softball, swimming, tennis, track and field, volleyball, wrestling, and cheerleading. The Mariners' cross-town rivals are the Cudahy High School Packers, who are members of the Midwest Classic Conference (Football Only) and the Woodland Conference.

== WIAA state championships ==
- 1975: Boys' cross country (Class B)
- 1976: Boys' basketball (Class B)
- 1976: Boys' track and field (Class B)
- 2009: Girls' Dance Team (D3)
- 2020: Poms and Dance Team (D1 Hip Hop)
- 2021: Poms and Dance Team (D1 Hip Hop)

=== Conference championships ===
Membership

- 1962-1963: Braveland Conference
- 1963-2006: Parkland Conference
- 2006-2009: Woodland Conference (Southern Division)
- 2009–present: Woodland Conference (Small Division)
- 1967-68: Baseball
- 1972-73: Baseball
- 1976-77: Boys' basketball
- 1976-77: Baseball
- 1980-81: Football
- 1980-81: Girls' basketball
- 1996-97: Football
- 2002-03: Football

=== Track and Field ===
The St. Francis High School boys track and field team program has consistently qualified athletes for sectional and state competition. It has produced numerous individual state champions and podium finishers in events ranging from sprints and distance races to jumps and throws. In 1976, it won the WIAA Boys Track and Field State Championship. The program has been, and continues to be, a competitive presence within the Wisconsin Interscholastic Athletic Association.

St. Francis High School Boys Track & Field State Champions
Athlete	Event	Mark/Time	Year
Burt Treweek	Long Jump	22′ 7.5″	1971
Phil Lacke	Pole Vault	13′ 0.25″	1973
Bob Lech	Pole Vault	13′ 0″	1976
Chuck Voltner	Discus	164′ 8″	1976
Chuck Voltner	Discus	161′ 6″	1977
Chuck Voltner	Shot Put	56′ 10″	1977
Curt Pronschiske	Discus	151′ 7″	1980
Joran Ball	400 m Dash	48.31	2025

St. Francis High School Girls Track & Field State Champions
Athlete	Event	Mark/Time	Year
Lynn Dusold	Shot Put	38′ 6″	1982
Lynn Dusold	Shot Put	43′ 10.5″	1983

=== Football ===
In 1994, St. Francis football had its first conference winning season since 1985. Since then, they have had 14 winning seasons, 12 playoff appearances, two conference championships and once finished as a state runner-up. As of the end of the 2007 season, the St. Francis Mariner football team has enjoyed eight consecutive playoff appearances, including a runner-up finish in the 2004 WIAA Division 4 Championship. The 2004 team was coached by SFHS alumnus Doug Sarver, who served as the team's head coach for 29 seasons and has been inducted into the Wisconsin Football Coaches Association Hall of Fame.

In 2019, Jeff Wallack was hired as the next head coach at SFHS-Wallack is the overall 7th head coach in the program's 64 year history. During Wallack's tenure, the Mariners have qualified for the WIAA playoffs 5 times. With the start of the 2025 season, the school improved their athletic facilities that included new stadium turf and rebranding the field as "Alumni Stadium" and in honor of Doug Sarver, renamed the field to "Sarver Field".

WIAA State Playoff Appearances 1996, 1997, 1998, 2000, 2001, 2002, 2003, 2004, 2005, 2006, 2007, 2008, 2014, 2015, 2016, 2017, 2018, 2019, 2022, 2023, 2024, 2025

=== Baseball ===
The St. Francis baseball program has been in existence since 1966 and participates in the Wisconsin Interscholastic Athletic Association summer season. The program has accumulated three conference championships, all in the Parkland Conference: in 1968, 1973, and 1977. The program offers baseball at the freshmen, junior varsity, and varsity levels.

=== Boys' basketball ===
St. Francis High School has offered boys' varsity basketball since the 1963-1964 school year. In 1976 the team won the state championship. Their first and only Parkland Conference championship was in 1977, when they finished the year at 15-5.

=== Girls' basketball ===
Due to the late onset of girls' basketball in the state of Wisconsin, St. Francis did not offer basketball to females until the 1976 season. The Mariners took their first regional championship in 1978-defeated Pewaukee 38-30. In their first and only trip to state (1981), they lost to Algoma in the Class B semi-finals by a score of 31-34. The team also won 2 more regional championships (1982 and 1983) as well as another Western Division championship in the Parkland Conference (1983).

=== Girls' volleyball ===
The Mariner volleyball program started in 1974. The team has qualified for the regional finals twice (in 1996 and 1998). St. Francis High School offers volleyball at the freshmen, junior varsity, and varsity levels.

== Controversy ==
In September 2024, Dimitri Kamolov, a part-time resource officer at St. Francis High School, was accused of felony invasion of privacy and felony attempt to capture an intimate representation without consent involving a student. According to criminal complaints, Kamolov allegedly used a hidden cellphone to record a student changing in a room. The student discovered the recording and reported it. An investigation by the Wisconsin Department of Justice led to the charges. On April 18, 2025, Kamolov pleaded guilty to the felony invasion of privacy charge; the other charge was dismissed but read in. His sentencing is scheduled for June 5, 2025. Following the allegations, Kamolov was placed on administrative leave, and the St. Francis Police Department initiated termination proceedings.

In May 2025, Jeff Wuerl, a junior varsity baseball coach at St. Francis High was arrested and subsequently charged with three counts of repeated sexual assault of a child, one count of third-degree sexual assault, and one count of causing mental harm to a child. According to the Milwaukee County Sheriff's office, Wuerl was taken into custody by the Milwaukee Police Department on May 25 and booked into the county jail. He was released from custody the following morning. May 26, after posting $10,000 bail. Following the arrest, the St. Francis Public School district immediately release Wuerl from all coaching responsibilities and issued a notice restricting him from school property and school-sponsored events. The district confirmed Wuerl, who was not a teacher at the school, is the subject of an ongoing investigation and that they were cooperating with law enforcement.

In 2025, the St. Francis School District was the subject of a legal complaint regarding alleged violations of Wisconsin's Open Meetings Law. The controversy began in June 2025, when members of the media were reportedly denied access to a school board meeting. Following a review by legal authorities, the district reached a settlement in July 2025 with the Wisconsin Newspaper Association. As part of the settlement agreement, the district did not admit to any wrongdoing but agreed to implement several procedural changes. These included updated training for board members and staff on public meeting requirements and a commitment to ensuring transparency and media access for all future public sessions.

== Notable alumni ==
- Daryl Stuermer (1952-), Genesis guitarist
- Jose Valdez (1986-), Former NFL and Canadian Football League lineman
- Doug Sarver (1956-), Wisconsin Football Coaches Association hall of fame member
