= Jeffrey S. Grob =

American Catholic priest (born 1961)

His Excellency, The Most Reverend Jeffrey Scott Grob
- Archbishop of Milwaukee
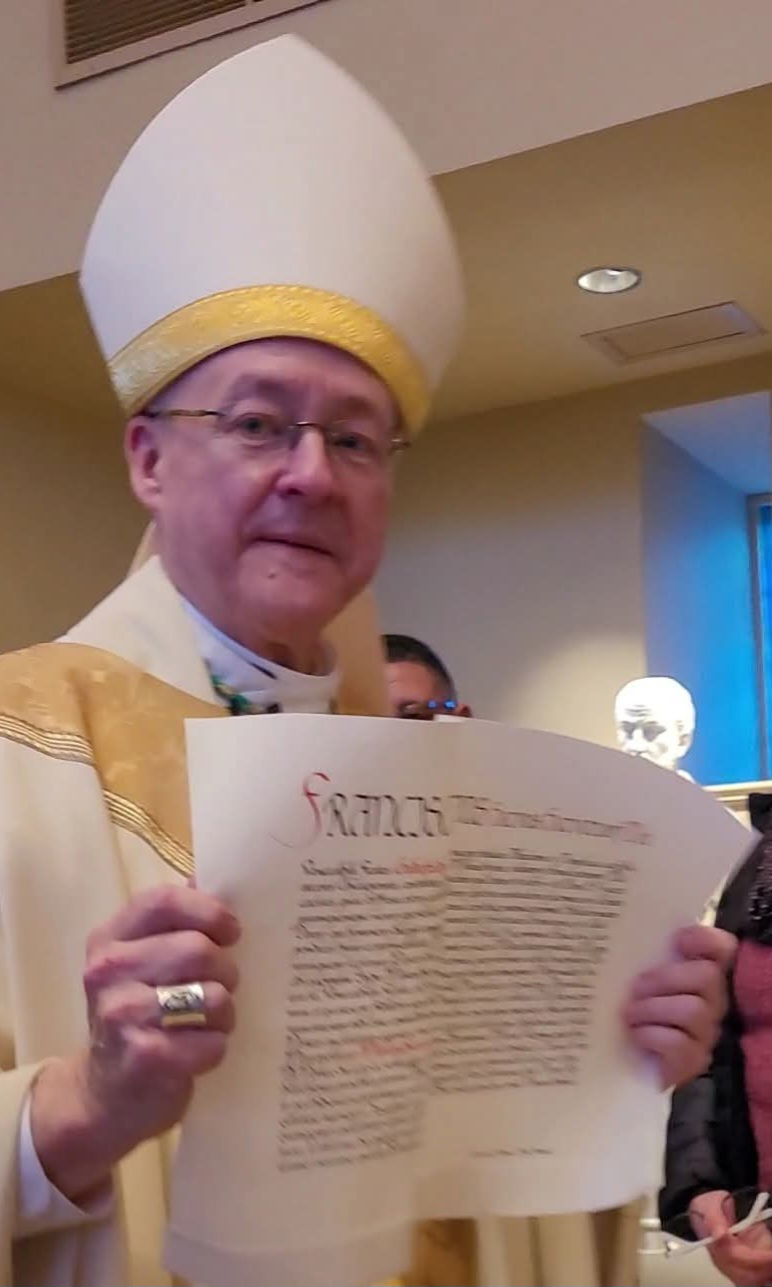
- See: Milwaukee
- Appointed: November 4, 2024
- Installed: January 14, 2025
- Predecessor: Jerome Listecki
- Previous posts: Auxiliary Bishop of Chicago & Titular Bishop of Abora (2020-2024)

Orders
- Ordination: May 23, 1992 by Joseph Bernardin
- Consecration: November 13, 2020 by Blase J. Cupich, John R. Manz, and Joseph N. Perry

Personal details
- Born: March 19, 1961 (age 65) Madison, Wisconsin, US
- Education: St. Meinrad Seminary; Pontifical College Josephinum; Saint John's University; Mundelein Seminary; Saint Paul University
- Motto: Jesus the vine

Styles of Jeffrey Scott Grob
- Reference style: His Excellency; The Most Reverend
- Spoken style: Your Excellency
- Religious style: Archbishop

Jeffrey Scott Grob (born March 19, 1961) is an American Catholic prelate who has served as Archbishop of Milwaukee since 2025. He previously served as an auxiliary bishop for the Archdiocese of Chicago from 2020 to 2025.

== Biography ==
=== Early life ===
Jeffrey Grob was born on March 19, 1961, in Cross Plains, Wisconsin, the only child of Gerald Grob and Bonnie (Meinholz) Grob, both dairy farmers. He attended Saint Francis Xavier School in Cross Plains. After deciding to enter the priesthood, Grob attended Holy Name High School Seminary in Madison, Wisconsin.

Grob then entered Saint Meinrad Seminary in St. Meinrad, Indiana, then finished his undergraduate education at the Pontifical College Josephinum in Ohio. He received Bachelor of Religious Studies degree from the Josephinum in 1988. Grob attended Saint John's University in Minnesota for one year, then continued his studies at Mundelein Seminary in Mundelein, Illinois. Grob received a Master of Divinity degree in 1992.

=== Priesthood ===
On May 23, 1992, Grob was ordained to the priesthood for the Archdiocese of Chicago by Cardinal Joseph Bernardin at Holy Name Cathedral in Chicago.

After his ordination, the archdiocese assigned Grob as resident and assistant pastor at Sts. Faith, Hope and Charity Parish in Winnetka, Illinois. In 1994, he assumed the additional responsibility of assistant chancellor for the archdiocese. Grob earned a Licentiate in Sacred Theology in 1999 from Mundelein Seminary.

After receiving his licentiate, Grob left Winnetka to attend Saint Paul University in Ottawa, Ontario. On weekends, he performed pastoral duties at St. Basil Parish in Ottawa. Grob received a Licentiate in Canon Law in 2000 from Saint Paul. During this time he also assisted the archdiocesan exorcist in responding to and assessing people seeking his assistance.

After Grob returned to Chicago, Cardinal Francis George named him as a judge of the archdiocesan court of appeals in 2003. He received his first appointment as pastor in 2005 at St. Anne Parish in Hazel Crest, Illinois.

Grob soon returned to Ottawa; he received a Doctor of Canon Law degree from St. Paul University in 2007 and a Doctor of Philosophy degree from the University of Ottawa. His doctoral thesis was a comparative study of the 1614 and 1998 versions of the rite of exorcism. Back in Chicago in 2008, Cardinal George appointed him pastor of St. Celestine Parish in Elmwood Park, Illinois and dean of Deanery IV-D. In 2015, Cardinal Blase Cupich named Grob as judicial vicar for the archdiocese. In 2017, he was elevated to chancellor.

=== Auxiliary Bishop of Chicago ===
The coat of arms used by Bishop Grob as Auxiliary Bishop of Chicago

Pope Francis appointed Grob as an auxiliary bishop of Chicago and titular bishop of Abora on September 11, 2020. On November 13, 2020, Grob was consecrated at Holy Name Cathedral in Chicago by Cupich, with Auxiliary Bishops John R. Manz and Joseph N. Perry serving as co-consecrators. Grob was the chief exorcist for the Archdiocese.

=== Archbishop of Milwaukee ===
On November 4, 2024, Pope Francis named Grob as the Archbishop of Milwaukee, to succeed Archbishop Jerome Listecki, whom Grob studied moral theology under while both were at Mundelein Seminary. He was installed on January 14, 2025.

He has stated his priorities: he wants to build bridges among local government leaders and other religious leaders, including the Jewish Federation, other Christian denominations, and Milwaukee's Muslim community. The Seton Catholic Schools in the city are another priority.

== See also ==
- Catholic Church hierarchy
- Catholic Church in the United States
- Historical list of the Catholic bishops of the United States
- List of Catholic bishops of the United States
- Lists of patriarchs, archbishops, and bishops

Catholic Church titles
Preceded by Jerome E. Listecki	Archbishop of Milwaukee; 2025–present	Succeeded by Incumbent
Preceded by -	Auxiliary Bishop of Chicago; 2020–2025	Succeeded by -
