= St. Francis School District =

School district in Wisconsin, United States

Coordinates: 42°58′03.6″N 87°51′12.7″W

The St. Francis School District is a public school district in Milwaukee County, Wisconsin. The district serves the city of St. Francis, Wisconsin. As of the 2023–24 school year, the district had 1,097 enrolled students. The district administrator is Dr. Deborah Kerr.

== Schools ==
- St. Francis High School, grades 9–12, 4225 S. Lake Drive
- Deer Creek Intermediate School, grades 4–8, 3680 S. Kinnickinnic Ave.
- Willow Glen Primary School, grades PK–3, 2600 E. Bolivar Ave.

== Mergers ==
Deer Creek Elementary School was formed as a result of the merger of Thompson and Faircrest Schools in 1992. In 2005, Willow Glen Elementary School was converted into a primary school serving students in kindergarten through third grade, with an intermediate school at the Deer Creek site serving fourth through eighth grades.
