= Doug Sarver =

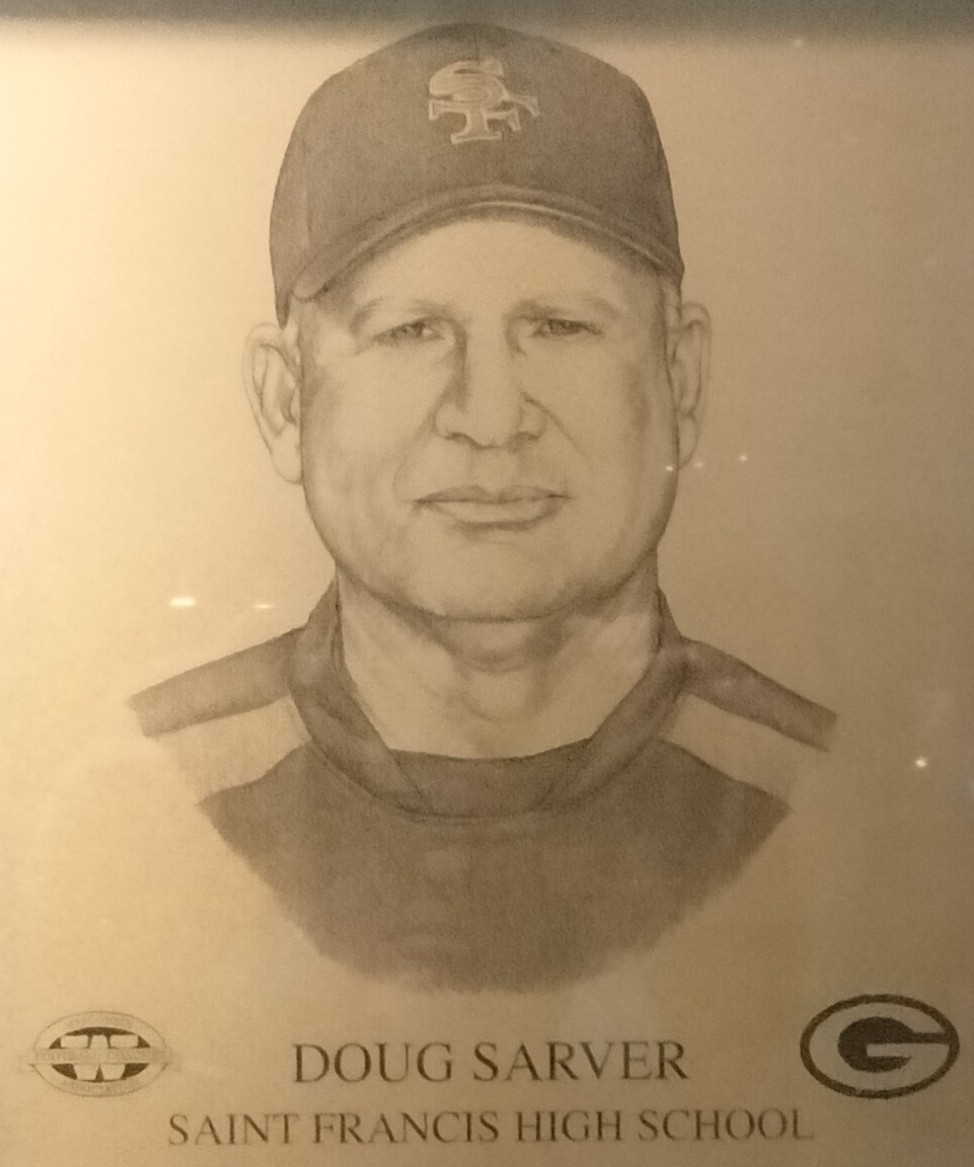
- Born: December 22, 1956 (age 69)
- Education: St. Francis High School, St. Francis, WI
- Occupations: High School Football Coach (retired) and Athletic Director
- Known for: Hall of Fame high school coaching career

Doug Sarver is a retired American high school football coach and active high school athletic director. He was the head coach of his alma mater, St. Francis High School. He coached the Mariners for 29 seasons, from 1990 through 2018. During this time he compiled a record of 154-129, winning 3 Parkland Conference championships, having a period where his teams qualified for the WIAA playoffs in 12 of 13 seasons, taking his teams to the playoffs a total of 17 times, and taking the Mariners to the WIAA Division 4 championship game in 2004.

== Early life ==
Doug is the son of Audrey and William (Bill) Sarver. Bill is a member of the Illinois State University Athletic Hall of Fame, having starred in baseball, basketball, and football. Doug followed in his dad's footsteps by being an all-around athlete at St. Francis High School. Doug participated in football and basketball for 4 years, baseball for 5 years (WIAA rules allowed incoming freshmen and graduated seniors to participate in WIAA summer baseball), and golf for 2 years (he was unable to participate in golf all 4 years because boys' golf became a fall sport while he was in high school.) Doug earned honorable mention all-conference honors in football as a running back his senior year, basketball honorable mention all-conference as a junior, and 2nd team all-conference basketball honors as a senior as a point guard.

Doug's younger brother Dan and younger sister Sandy also attended SFHS.

== Pre head-coaching days ==
While still attending SFHS, Doug coached Saturday morning recreation basketball from 1973 to 1975. In the summers he worked as baseball instructor and coach for the St. Francis Recreation Department. After graduating from SFHS in 1975, Doug attended UW-Whitewater for two years.

Upon returning to St. Francis in 1977, Doug became active in coaching youth sports. He coached youth basketball from 1977 to 1989, founded the St. Francis Warriors Youth Football program in 1978, served as its head coach from 1978 to 1991, and became its director at its founding. He has remained the director to the present time. He served as the SFHS boys and girls head track and field coach from 1982 to 1999. In 1985 he joined Dan Brunner's varsity football staff as an assistant, and when Brunner left after the 1989 season to move on to Hartford Union High School, Doug took over as the head coach.

== Heading coach at SFHS ==
Doug Sarver began his tenure as the head football coach at St. Francis High School in the 1990 season. His 29 years as head coach is the 2nd longest head coaching tenure for any sport in SFHS history, second only to Mike Szydlowski's 30-year tenure as girls basketball coach. He retired after the 2018 season, and was replaced by one of his assistants, Jeff Wallack.

Among Doug's favorite memories as head coach was upsetting rival Franklin High School in 1992 to regain the "gold shovel" that the schools battled for each season. Since 1992 was the last season that Franklin was in the Parkland Conference, St. Francis has retained the shovel since 1992.

Season	Overall Record	Conference Record and Conference Standing	Postseason
1990	3-6	Independent	
1991	3-6	Parkland - record and place unavailable	
1992	3-6	Parkland - record and place unavailable	
1993	2-7	Parkland - record and place unavailable	
1994	5-4	Parkland - record and place unavailable	
1995	6-3	Parkland - record and place unavailable	
1996	10-1	7-0 Parkland Conference Champions	Beat Palmyra-Eagle 43-0 WIAA Level 1; Lost to Columbus 43-7 WIAA Level 2
1997	7-3	5-1 Parkland	Lost to Lomira 21-14 WIAA Level 1
1998	4-6	4-3 Parkland	Lost to Mayville 34-7 WIAA Level 1
1999	4-5	2-5 Parkland	
2000	6-4	5-2 2nd Parkland	Lost to Madison Edgewood 40-0 WIAA Level 1
2001	6-4	5-2 2nd in Parkland	Lost to Palmyra-Eagle 42-7 WIAA Level 1
2002	9-2	6-1 Parkland Conference Champions	Beat Horicon/Hustisford 54-6 WIAA Level 1; Lost to Kewaunee 38-20 WIAA Level 2
2003	8-3	5-2 Parkland Conference Champions	Beat Shboygan Falls 27-20 WIAA Level 1; Lost to Columbus 14-6 WIAA Level 2
2004	12-2	6-1 2nd Parkland	Beat Racine St. Catherine's 56-15 WIAA Level 1; Beat Lomira 49-7 WIAA Level 2; Beat Mayville 42-25 WIAA Level 3; Beat Brodhead/Juda 14-7 WIAA Level 4; Lost to Sturgeon Bay 14-7 WIAA Division 4 Championship Game
2005	6-4	4-2 Parkland	Lost to St. Thomas More 21-0 WIAA Level 1
2006	6-4	4-1 2nd Woodland East	Lost to Brodhead/Juda 29-23 WIAA Level 1
2007	5-5	3-2 3rd Woodland East	Lost to Big Foot 35-0 WIAA Level 1
2008	6-4	5-3 5th Woodland West	Lost to Wisconsin Lutheran 56-7 WIAA Level 1
2009	1-8	0-5 6th Woodland East	
2010	3-6	1-4 5th Woodland East	
2011	2-7	1-4 5th Woodland East	
2012	0-8	0-5 6th Woodland East	
2013	2-7	1-5 tied 4th Woodland East	
2014	6-4	4-3 4th Midwest Classic Small	Lost to Wisconsin Lutheran 41-14 WIAA Level 1
2015	8-2	6-1 2nd Midwest Classic Small	Lost ot Whitnall 21-19 WIAA Level 1
2016	6-4	5-2 3rd Midwest Classic Small	Lost to Kiel 41-14 WIAA Level 1
2017	7-3	4-2 3rd Midwest Classic Small	Lost to Greendale 35-6 WIAA Level 1
2018	7-2	5-1 2nd Midwest Classic Small	Lost to Sheboygan Falls 27-0 WIAA Level 1

== Honors ==
- 1996 Milwaukee Journal Coach of the Year
- 1996 Community Newspapers Coach of the Year
- 2002 Community Newspapers Coach of the Year
- 2004 Wisconsin Football Coaches Association Coach of the Year
- 2009 Selected to Wisconsin Football Coaches Hall of Fame

== Post-coaching activities ==
Doug Sarver continues to serve as the athletic director at SFHS. He plans to stay through the 2025–26 school year, and he is overseeing the installing of an artificial turf surface at the St. Francis High School football stadium. In addition, he is active in these community service projects:

- Coordinator of the SFHS Athletic Wall of Fame Committee
- Coordinator of the SFHS Homecoming Alumni Zone
- Co-administrator of the St. Francis Mariner Alumni Nation Facebook page
