= Paul Dobberstein =

American architect

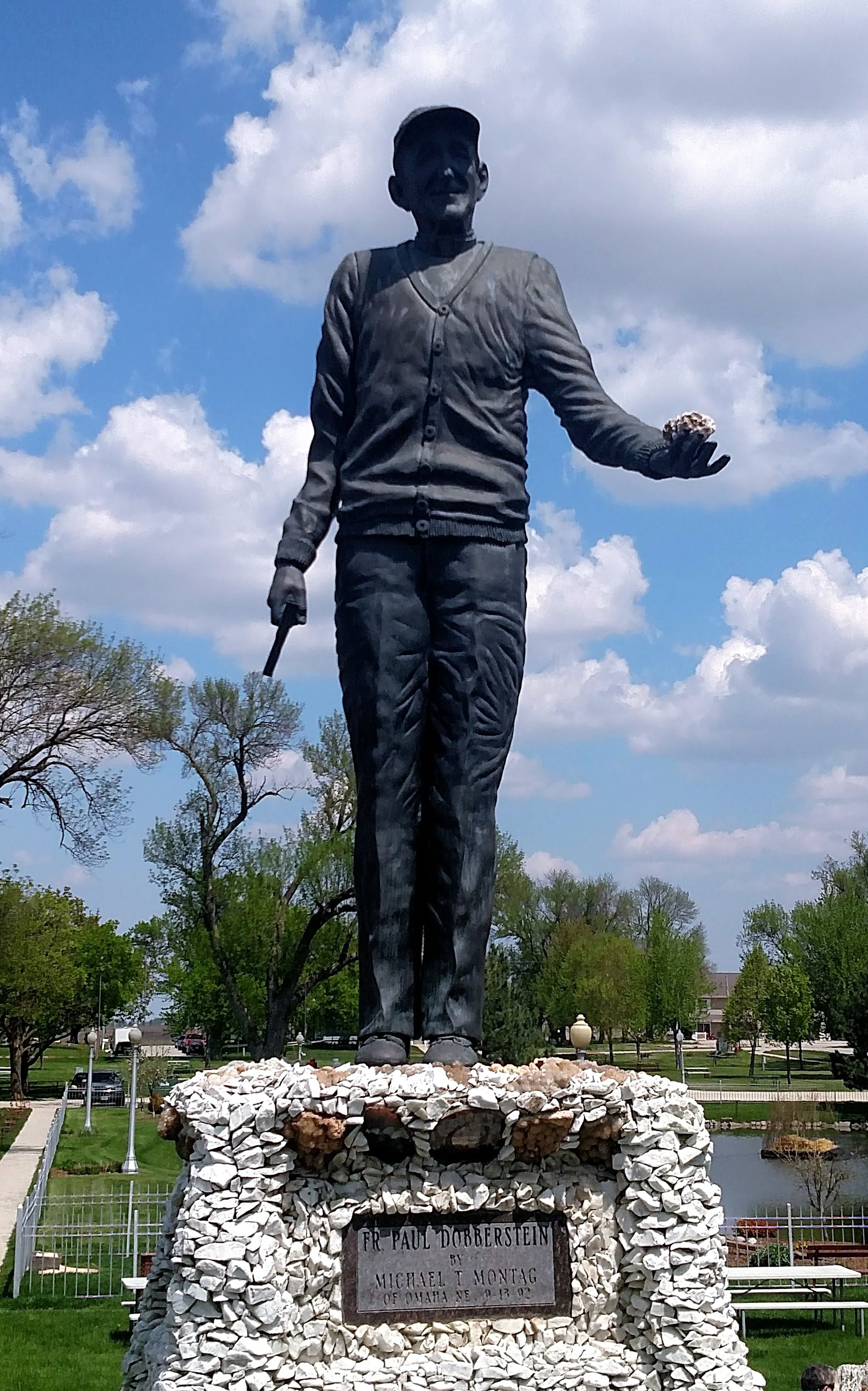
Paul Dobberstein statue at the Grotto of the Redemption

Paul Matthias Dobberstein (September 21, 1872 – July 24, 1954) was a German American priest and architect.

Dobberstein was born in Rosenfeld, Germany to Francis "Frank" Dobberstein and Julia Froehlich.

Father Dobberstein was educated at the university of Deutsch-Krone in Germany and at the St. Francis Seminary, in St. Francis, Wisconsin. He was ordained on June 30, 1897.

He raised a daughter who travelled to his parish on an orphan train. She is cited as his adopted daughter in the 1910 United States census.

== Grottoes ==
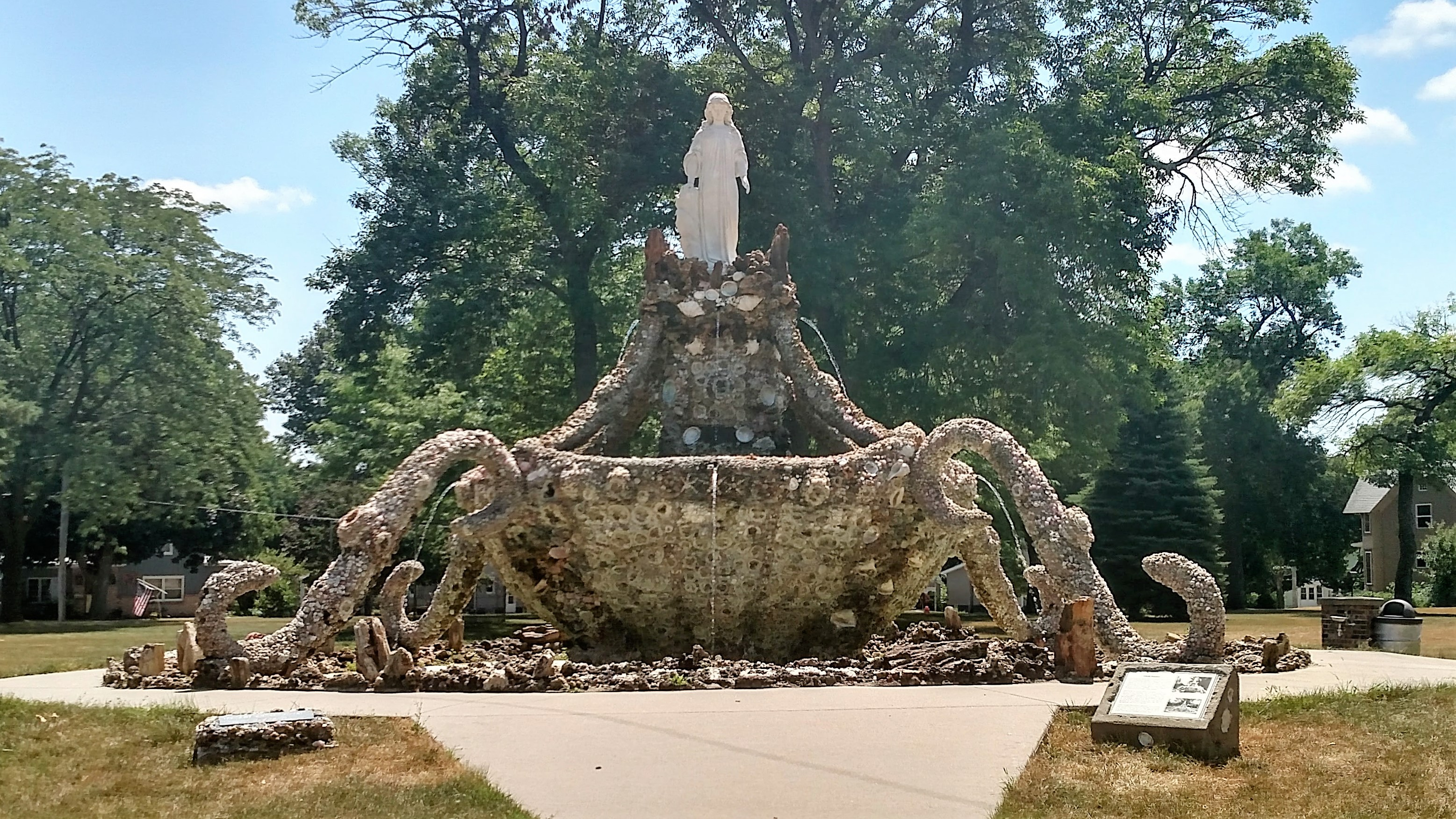
The Liberty Fountain in John Brown Park, Humboldt

Father Dobberstein is most known for designing and building The Shrine of the Grotto of the Redemption, in West Bend, Iowa, in the Roman Catholic Diocese of Sioux City. This is actually a series of several connected grottoes. At the neighboring church of Saints Peter and Paul, he also created a fountain and, inside, a nativity scene.

Other religious grottoes designed and built by Dobberstein include:

- Sacred Heart Church: Sioux City, Iowa
- Immaculate Conception Grotto: Carroll, Iowa (now gone)
- Franciscan Convent: Dubuque, Iowa
- Shrine in the St. Rose of Viterbo Convent of the Franciscan Sisters of Perpetual Adoration: La Crosse, Wisconsin (now gone)
- Catholic Cemetery: Wesley, Iowa
- John Brown Park: Humboldt, Iowa

Father Dobberstein's works inspired Mathias Wernerus (who also attended St. Francis Seminary) to build the Dickeyville Grotto in Dickeyville, Wisconsin in 1930, thus starting the grotto building movement in America.

== Pastoral career ==
In addition to his prolific works of art and stone, he was the pastor of Saints Peter and Paul in West Bend for more than 57 years.
