= Bernard B. Kroenke =

20th century American politician

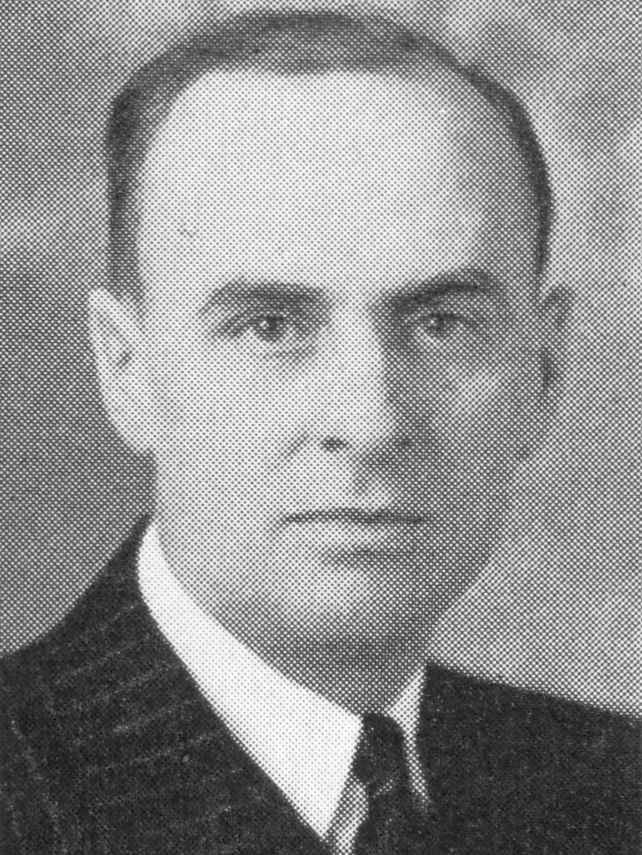
Kroenke circa 1940

Bernard B. Kroenke (May 31, 1898 – December 24, 1981) was a member of the Wisconsin State Assembly.

== Biography ==
Kroenke was born on May 31, 1898, in Milwaukee, Wisconsin. He attended St. Francis Seminary and Marquette University. During World War I, he served in the 121st Field Artillery Regiment of the 32nd Infantry Division of the United States Army. Afterwards, Kroenke worked for the Milwaukee Railroad.

== Political career ==
Kroenke was a member of the Assembly from 1935 to 1940. He was a Democrat.
