= Mount Mercy University =

Catholic liberal arts university in Cedar Rapids, Iowa, US

Coordinates: 42°0′8.08″N 91°39′5.49″W

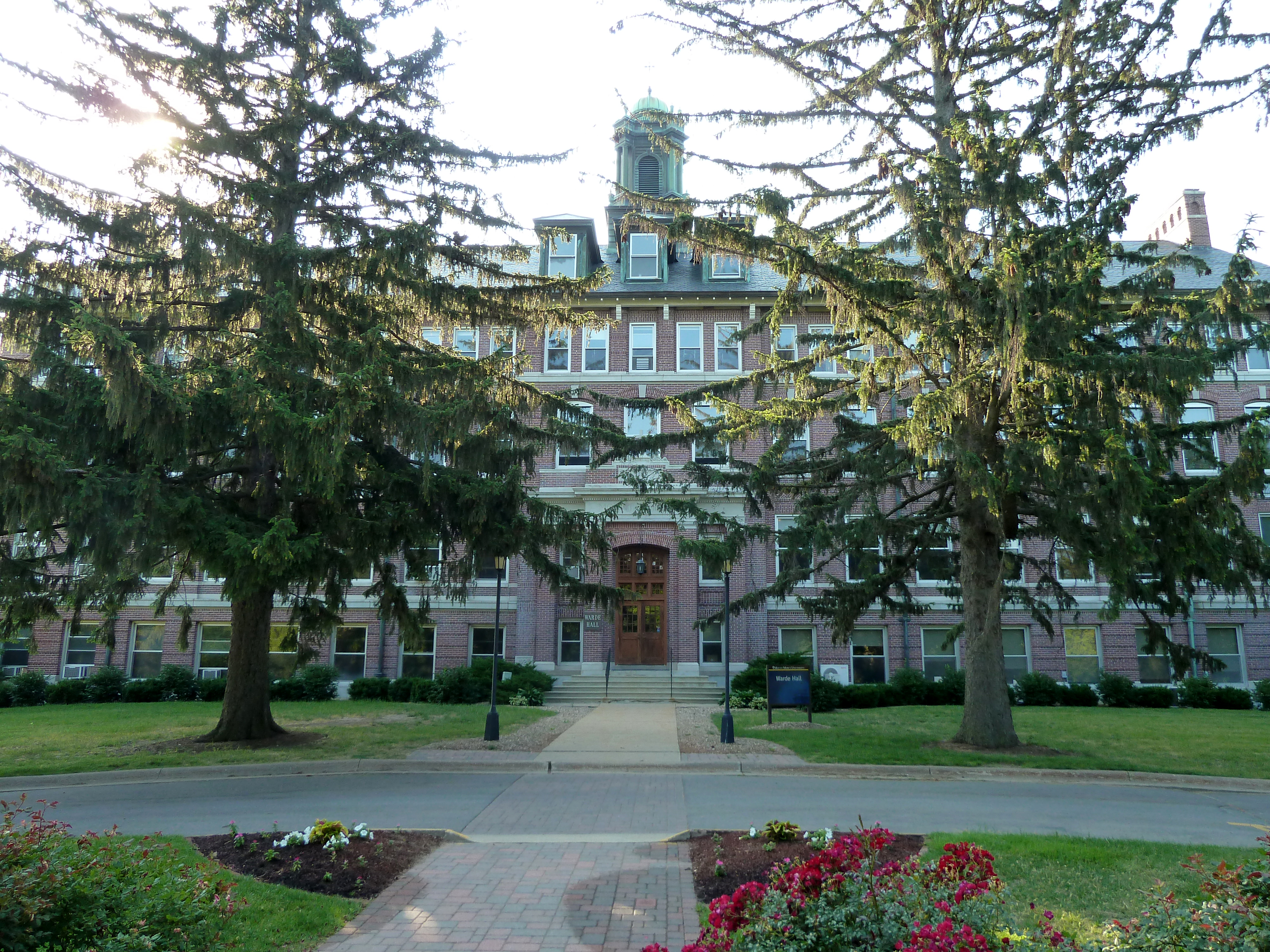
- Warde Hall
- Former name: Mount Mercy College (1928–2010)
- Motto: Pacem et Veritatem Diligite
- Type: Private university
- Established: 1928; 98 years ago
- Religious affiliation: Roman Catholic (Sisters of Mercy)
- Academic affiliations: ACCU; CIC; NAICU
- President: Todd A. Olson
- Students: 1,451 (fall 2023)
- Location: Cedar Rapids, Iowa, U.S.
- Campus: Urban, 40 acres (16 ha)
- Colors: Navy Blue & Gold
- Nickname: Mustangs
- Sporting affiliations: NAIA – HAAC
- Mascot: Mustang Sally
- Website: www.mtmercy.edu

Mount Mercy University is a private Catholic university in Cedar Rapids, Iowa, United States. It was founded by the Sisters of Mercy in 1928.

Students take a core of liberal arts courses as a foundation for areas of study including English, fine arts, history, mathematics, multicultural studies, natural science, philosophy, theology and social science. The university offers more than 40 undergraduate programs and nine graduate programs.

== Campus ==
Mount Mercy University's 40-acre (16 ha) campus is in a residential neighborhood in Cedar Rapids, Iowa (population 134,268). It contains the Our Mother of Sorrows Grotto, which is listed as a historic district on the National Register of Historic Places.

== History ==
Mount Mercy University was founded as a two-year college for women in 1928 by the Sisters of Mercy of Cedar Rapids, Iowa. These sisters, whose order was founded in 1831 by Catherine McAuley in Dublin, Ireland, have been active in Cedar Rapids since 1875. The college was an outgrowth of their concerns about the education of women.

In 1957, Mount Mercy became a four-year institution and awarded its first bachelor's degree in 1959. The college received accreditation as a baccalaureate institution by the North Central Association in 1960. In 1968, the Sisters of Mercy transferred their legal authority and responsibility to a self-perpetuating independent board of which three members would always be Sisters of Mercy. Mount Mercy College became coeducational in 1969. While integrating a strong liberal arts component, the college has always emphasized professional development from its early involvement, as a junior college, on business courses and teacher education. The departments of nursing, education, and social work were accredited in the 1960s and 1970s as the four-year programs developed. Initiated in 1997, the Adult Accelerated program, a joint Mount Mercy University/Kirkwood Community College accelerated degree completion program for working adults meets an important community workforce development need.

On August 23, 2010, the institution was re-designated as a university.

In May 2024, the university announced a partnership with fellow Catholic institution St. Ambrose University in Davenport that would allow students from both institutions to freely take classes at them. At the time of the announcement, a merger was "being explored for the future." Three months later, in August 2024, it was announced that the university would merge with St. Ambrose.

=== Presidents ===
- Mary Ildephonse Holland, 1928–1933, 1946–1961
- Mary Cornelia Burke, 1933–1939
- Mary Maura Marron, 1939–1946
- Mary Agnes Hennessey, 1961–1977
- Thomas R. Feld, 1977–1999
- Robert Pearce, 1999–2006
- Christopher R.L. Blake, 2006–2013
- Norm R. Nielsen, 2013–2014
- Laurie Hamen, 2014–2020
- Robert Beatty, July 1, 2020–September 9, 2020
- Tim Laurent, September 9, 2020–July 21, 2021 (interim)
- Todd A. Olson, July 21, 2021–present

== Catholic identity ==
Mount Mercy is sponsored by the Institute of the Sisters of Mercy of the Americas, through the Conference for Mercy Higher Education. The Campus Ministry operates Mass, retreats, and service-learning opportunities.

== Athletics ==
The Mount Mercy athletic teams are called the Mustangs. The university is a member of the National Association of Intercollegiate Athletics (NAIA), primarily competing in the Heart of America Athletic Conference (HAAC) since the 2016–17 academic year, after spending a season as an NAIA Independent within the Association of Independent Institutions (AII) during the 2015–16 school year. The Mustangs previously competed in the defunct Midwest Collegiate Conference (MCC) from 1988–89 to 2014–15 (when the conference dissolved).

Mount Mercy competes in 20 intercollegiate varsity sports. Men's sports include baseball, basketball, bowling, cross country, golf, football, soccer, track & field (indoor and outdoor) and volleyball; while women's sports include basketball, bowling, cross country, golf, soccer, softball, lacrosse, track & field (indoor and outdoor) and volleyball; and co-ed sports include competitive cheer and competitive dance. Varsity and junior varsity programs are available in several sports.

Intramural activities include basketball, volleyball, golf, flag football, softball and cross country.
