= Bill Burbach =

American baseball player (1947–2022)

- Pitcher
- Born: August 22, 1947; Dickeyville, Wisconsin, U.S.
- Died: July 20, 2022 (aged 74); Elizabethton, Tennessee, U.S.
- Batted: Right Threw: Right

MLB debut
- April 11, 1969, for the New York Yankees

Last MLB appearance
- April 24, 1971, for the New York Yankees

MLB statistics
- Win–loss record: 6–11
- Earned run average: 4.48
- Strikeouts: 95
- Stats at Baseball Reference

Teams
- New York Yankees (1969–1971)

William David Burbach (August 22, 1947 – July 20, 2022) was an American Major League Baseball pitcher who played for the New York Yankees from 1969 to 1971. Listed at 6 ft 4 in (1.93 m), 215 lb (98 kg), Burbach batted and threw right handed. He was born in Dickeyville, Wisconsin, and attended Iowa University.

The Yankees selected Burbach in the first round, 19th pick of the 1965 MLB draft. He spent four years in the Minor Leagues before joining the big team.

Burbach posted a 6–11 record with a 4.48 ERA in 37 pitching appearances for the Yankees, 28 of them starts including a shutout. Afterwards, he pitched in the Baltimore Orioles and Minnesota Twins Minor League systems in 1971 and 1972.

Overall, Burbach went 38–54 with a 3.69 ERA in 162 minor league games. In between, he played winter ball with the Cardenales de Lara club of the Venezuelan League in the 1971–72 season.

Burbach died July 20, 2022, at Sycamore Shoals Hospital in Elizabethton, Tennessee.
