= Dickeyville Grotto =

Series of grottos and shrines in Dickeyville, Grant County, Wisconsin, United States

Coordinates: 42.6272°N 90.5948°W

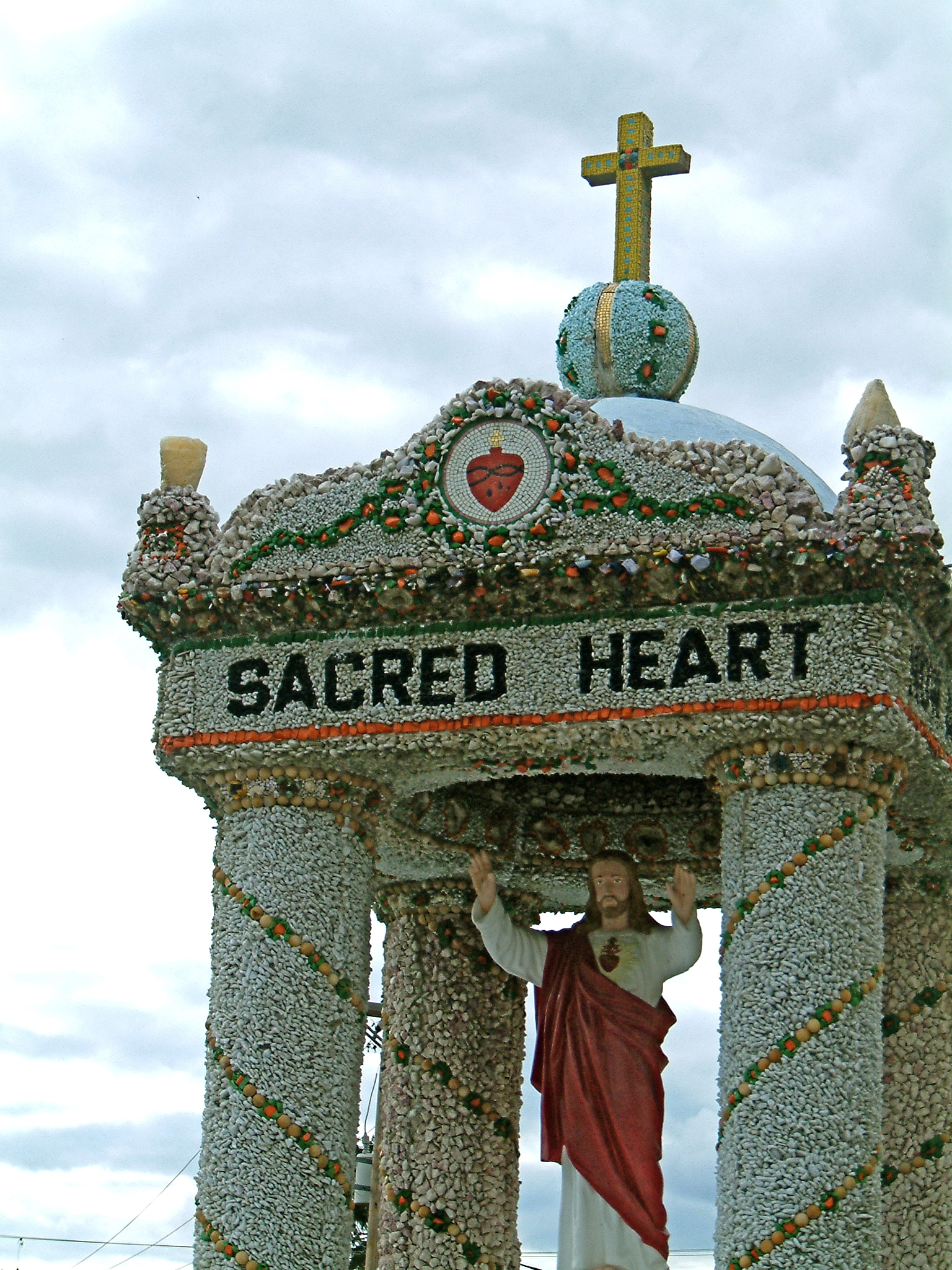
Sacred Heart shrine at the grotto

The Dickeyville Grotto is a series of grottos and shrines in Dickeyville, Grant County, Wisconsin, United States. It is located at the intersection of U.S. Highway 151 and U.S. Highway 61. Most of the site's concrete structures are covered in shells, stones, tiles, wood, glass, gems and geodes donated by area parishioners. The site is visited by 40,000 to 60,000 visitors per year.

== History ==
The Dickeyville Grotto was built by Father Mathius Wernerus, the pastor of Dickeyville's Holy Ghost Parish, from 1920 to 1930. It was renovated between 1995 and 1997. The site includes the Grotto of the Blessed Virgin, Christ the King Shrine, Grotto of the Sacred Heart, the Eucharistic Altar, the Holy Ghost Tree, the Patriotism Shrine and the Crucifixion Group.

Although most of the site's components are religious in nature, the Patriotism Shrine includes depictions of Columbus, Washington and Lincoln. According to Anne Pryor, a cultural anthropologist, this shrine was erected to demonstrate the patriotism of Catholics; Protestant Americans of the time believed that Catholics' allegiance to the Pope conflicted with their allegiance to the United States.

The Dickeyville Grotto was perhaps inspired by the Grotto of the Redemption in West Bend, Iowa which Paul Dobberstein began in 1912 and continued to work on until his death in 1954. Father Wernerus attended St. Francis Seminary and may have also been influenced by Dobberstein's first grotto which is found on seminary grounds.

The grotto inspired Paul and Matilda Wegner's grotto in Cataract, Wisconsin, and Mollie Jenson's Art Exhibit in River Falls, Wisconsin.

== Notes ==
- Smith, Peyton (2003). "Grottos of the Midwest: Religion and Patriotism in Stone". Archived from the original on July 24, 2008.
