= Roman Catholic Diocese of Lead =

Former residential and current titular see of the Catholic Church

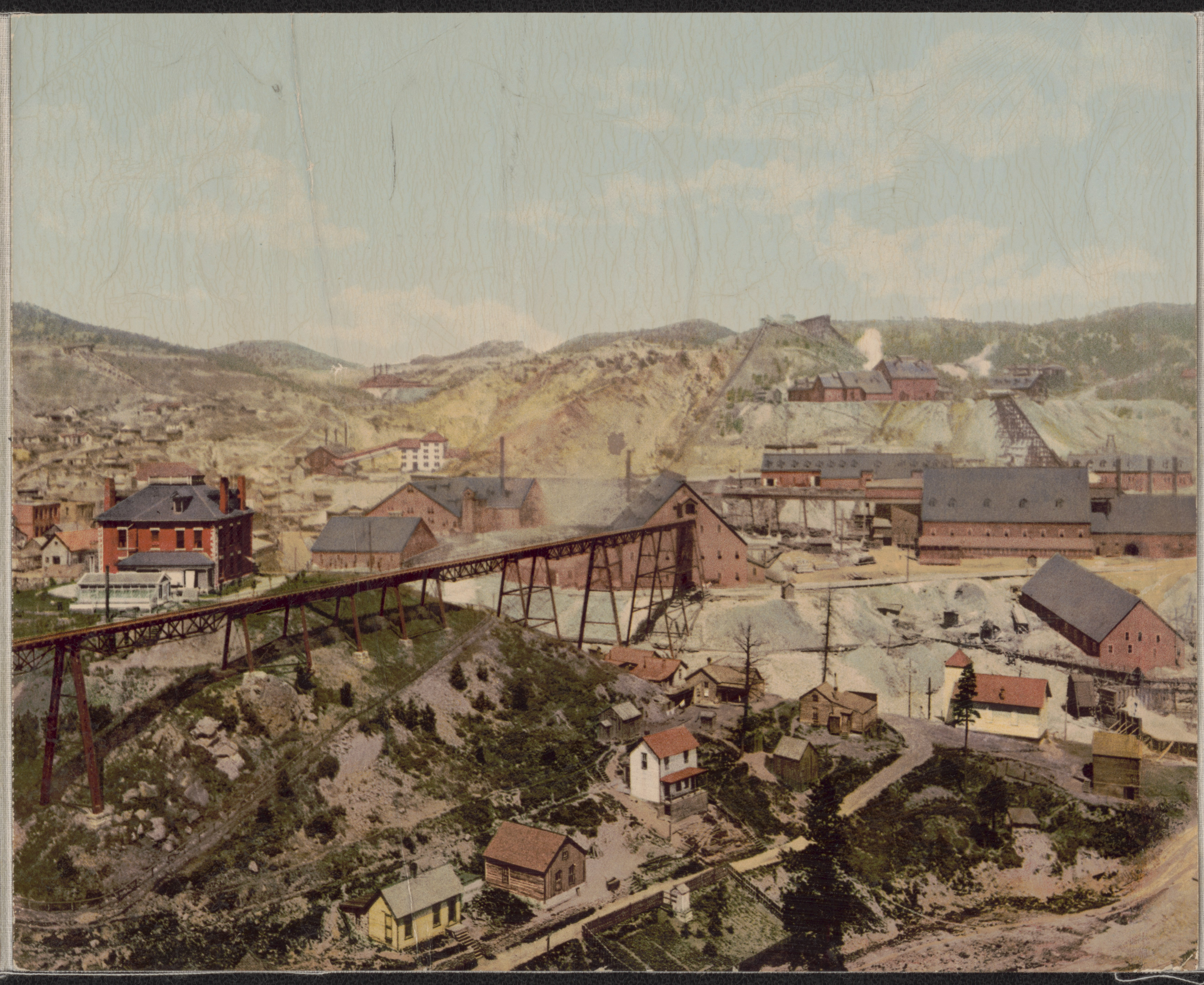
Lead, South Dakota in 1901

The Diocese of Lead (Latin: Dioecesis Leadensis) was a Latin Church diocese of the Catholic Church in South Dakota. It was created on August 4, 1902, by Pope Leo XIII. The diocese covered the portion of South Dakota west of the Missouri River, a region sometimes known as West River. Its seat was in Lead, South Dakota, at St Patrick's Cathedral. On August 1, 1930, the name of the diocese was changed to the Roman Catholic Diocese of Rapid City.

In 1995, the Diocese of Lead was restored as a titular see with Bishop Joseph Perry being the first to receive the titular see.
