= Joseph N. Perry =

American Catholic prelate (born 1948)

His Excellency, The Most Reverend Joseph N. Perry
- Auxiliary Bishop Emeritus of Chicago
- Archdiocese: Chicago
- Appointed: May 5, 1999
- Retired: September 19, 2023
- Other post: Titular Bishop of Lead

Orders
- Ordination: May 24, 1975 by William Edward Cousins
- Consecration: June 29, 1998 by Francis George, Rembert Weakland, and George Murry,

Personal details
- Born: April 18, 1948 (age 78) Chicago, Illinois, US
- Education: Saint Joseph's College; Saint Francis de Sales Seminary; Catholic University of America
- Motto: Emitte me Domine (Latin for 'Send me, Lord')
- Styles
- Reference style: His Excellency; The Most Reverend
- Spoken style: Your Excellency
- Religious style: Bishop

Joseph Nathaniel Perry (born April 18, 1948) is an American Catholic prelate who served as an auxiliary bishop of the Archdiocese of Chicago from 1998 to 2023.

Perry is a past vice-president of the board of the National Black Catholic Congress, and chairman of the US Conference of Catholic Bishops (USCCB) Subcommittee on African-American Affairs. He is also a supporter and celebrant of the sacraments according to the Extraordinary Form.

== Biography ==
=== Early life and education ===
A native of Chicago, Joseph Nathaniel Perry was born on April 18, 1948. He attended various Catholic elementary schools in Chicago between 1954 and 1962. In 1963, he attended Carver High School for one year before transferring to St. Lawrence Seminary High School in Mt. Calvary, Wisconsin.

In 1967, Perry entered the Capuchin Seminary of St. Mary in Crown Point, Indiana where he studied through 1971. He then attended Saint Joseph's College in Rensselaer, Indiana, receiving a Bachelor of Philosophy degree and a Bachelor of Theology degree. Perry then entered St. Francis Seminary, receiving a Master of Divinity degree in 1975.

=== Ordination and ministry ===
On May 24, 1975, Perry was ordained a priest by Archbishop William Edward Cousins for the Archdiocese of Milwaukee. After his ordination, he was assigned as associate pastor at St. Nicholas Parish in Milwaukee. In 1976, Perry was appointed to the archdiocesan tribunal. Between 1979 and 1981, Perry attended the Catholic University of America in Washington, DC, obtaining a Licentiate of Canon Law. After receiving his licentiate, Perry returned to the tribunal, where he was appointed chief judicial officer in 1983. At the same time, he started teaching canon law at Sacred Heart School of Theology in Hales Corners.

In 1995, Perry returned to pastoral work as pastor of All Saints Parish in Milwaukee. In 1996, he began teaching canon law at Marquette University Law School and a year later at Mundelein Seminary.

=== Auxiliary Bishop of Chicago ===
On May 5, 1998, Pope John Paul II appointed Perry as an auxiliary bishop of the Archdiocese of Chicago and titular bishop of Lead. He was consecrated on June 29, 1998 by Cardinal Francis George. Upon becoming bishop, he was made the episcopal vicar for Vicariate VI of the archdiocese.

Perry is a supporter and celebrant of the Traditional Latin Mass, and has celebrated the sacraments according to the traditional rite. He has praised Pope Benedict XVI for promulgating Summorum Pontificum, the motu proprio allowing the celebration of the traditional Mass, comparing Benedict as "like an Angel from heaven" by allowing "two legitimate forms of the Roman liturgy".

=== Membership and appointments ===
In 2010, George named Perry as the diocesan postulator for the sainthood cause of Augustus Tolton, a former slave who became the first known African-American priest in the Catholic Church.

Perry served as chair of the USCCB Committee on African American Catholics. He has also served on several other USCCB committees, including those for Education, Home Missions; the Ad Hoc Committee on Catholics' Use of Holy Scripture; the Secretariat for Family, Laity, Women and Youth; and the Ad Hoc Committee for a Plenary Council, the Catholic Campaign for Human Development, the subcommittee for the Defense of Marriage and the subcommittee for Migrants, Refugees and Travelers.

Since 1977, Perry has been a member of the Canon Law Society of America (CLSA). In 1998, he sat on the board of advisors of Archbishop Quigley Preparatory Seminary in Chicago. In addition, he served as an episcopal liaison for catechetics and Liturgical Training Publications (LTP) of the archdiocese, and as a judge on the Ecclesiastical Court of Appeals for all the Illinois dioceses.

=== Resignation ===
Pope Francis accepted Perry's resignation on September 19, 2023. Perry had submitted his resignation to the pope when he turned age 75, the age at which all bishops are required to by canon law.

Catholic Church titles
Preceded by –	Auxiliary Bishop of Chicago; 1998–2023	Succeeded by –
Preceded by —	— TITULAR — Bishop of Lead; 1998–present	Incumbent
