= St. Francis, Wisconsin =

- City
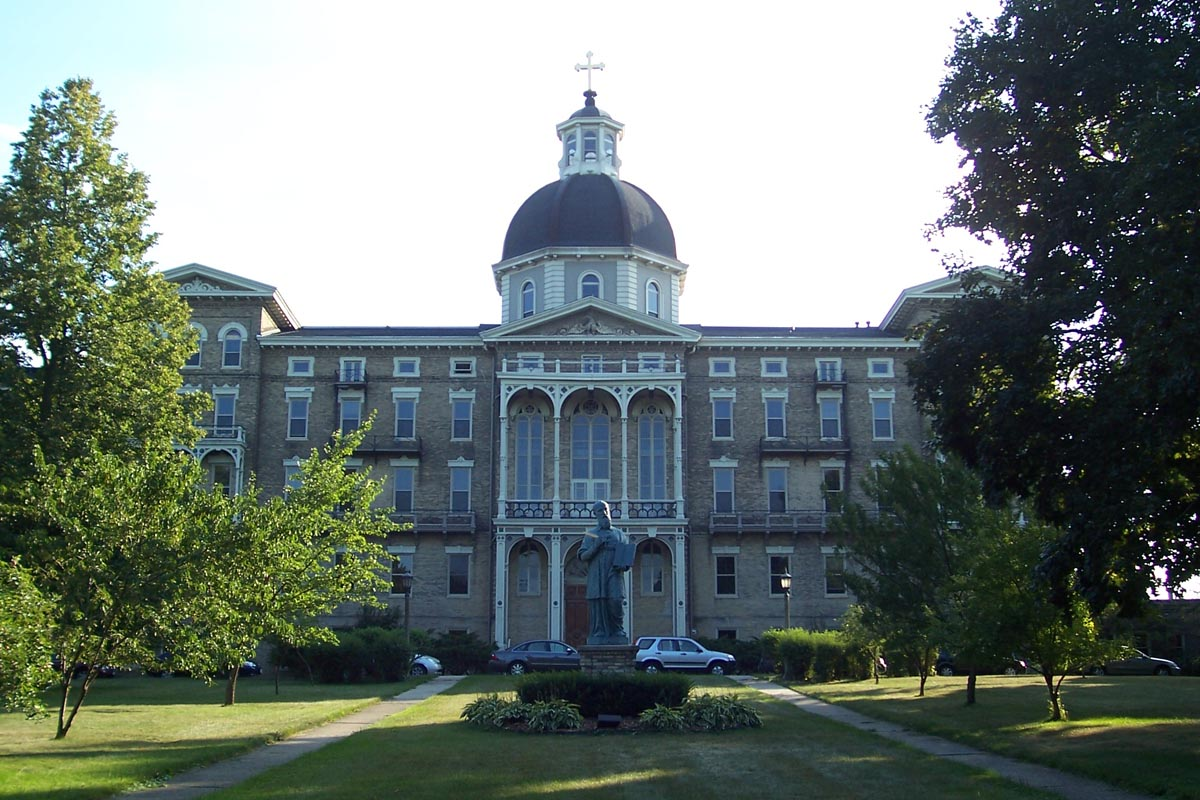
- Saint Francis de Sales Seminary
- Motto: "Where Your Heart Remains"
- Interactive map of St. Francis, Wisconsin
- Location within Wisconsin Location within the United States
- Coordinates: 42°58′11″N 87°52′36″W
- Country: United States
- State: Wisconsin
- County: Milwaukee
- Incorporated: July 25, 1951; 75 years ago

Government
  - Mayor: Ken Tutaj

Area
  - Total: 2.57 sq mi (6.65 km^{2})
  - Land: 2.57 sq mi (6.65 km^{2})
  - Water: 0 sq mi (0.00 km^{2})
- Elevation: 692 ft (211 m)

Population (2020)
  - Total: 9,161
  - Estimate (2021): 9,457
  - Density: 3,777.5/sq mi (1,458.51/km^{2})
- Time zone: UTC-6 (Central (CST))
  - Summer (DST): UTC-5 (CDT)
- ZIP code: 53235
- Area code: 414
- FIPS code: 55-70650
- GNIS feature ID: 1572924
- Website: http://www.stfranciswi.org

St. Francis is a city in Milwaukee County, Wisconsin, United States. The population was 9,161 at the 2020 census. A suburb of Milwaukee along Lake Michigan, it is part of the Milwaukee metropolitan area.

== History ==
The area that is now St. Francis was known as "Nojoshing" by local Native Americans at the time that the first white settlers arrived. St. Francis Seminary was established in what is now the city in 1845. The Sisters of St. Francis of Assisi settled there in the mid-19th century.

Historically, what is now the city of St. Francis was part of the Town of Lake. As large parts of the Town of Lake were gradually being annexed into the city of Milwaukee, residents in the St. Francis area sought to incorporate their community to prevent this from happening to them. A movement to split St. Francis off from the rest of the Town of Lake as a city existed as early as the 1920s, but faced resistance from residents of the rest of the town. Ultimately, the residents successfully voted to incorporate on July 24, 1951, and the result was certified the next day. The rest of the Town of Lake was annexed into Milwaukee in 1954.

The city took its name from Saint Francis de Sales Seminary, founded by Archbishop John Henni, the first Archbishop of Milwaukee, who placed it under the patronage of Francis de Sales, the first Catholic bishop of Switzerland after the Swiss Reformation.

== Geography ==
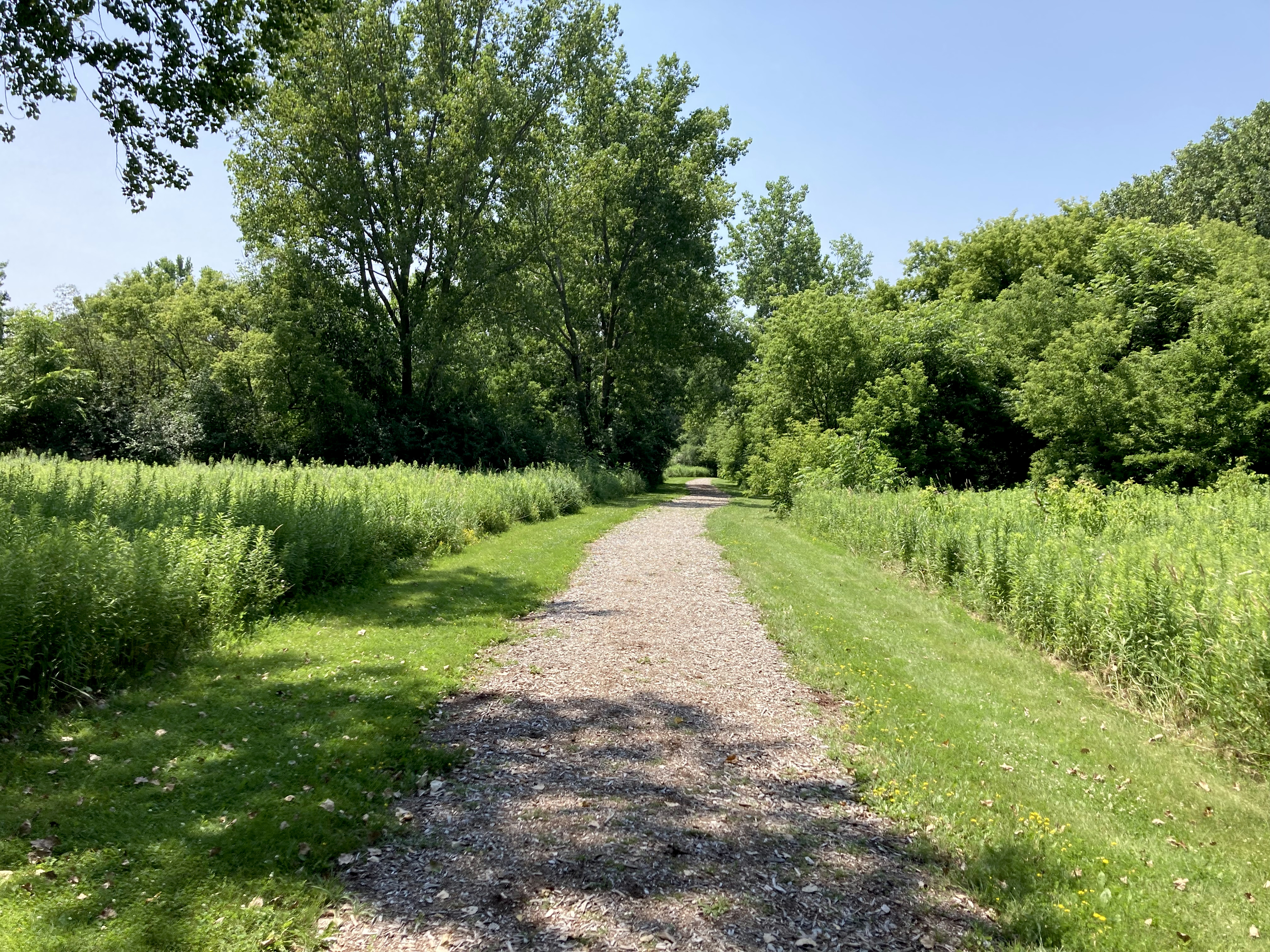
Nojoshing Trail in St. Francis

St. Francis is located at 42°58′11″N 87°52′36″W (42.969615, -87.876745).

According to the United States Census Bureau, the city has a total area of 2.55 square miles (6.60 km^{2}), all land.

The city is located directly south and east of the City of Milwaukee, directly west of Lake Michigan, and directly north of Cudahy, Wisconsin. Milwaukee's primary airport, Milwaukee Mitchell International Airport, is bordered on one side by St. Francis.

== Demographics ==
Historical population
| Census | Pop. | Note | %± |
|---|---|---|---|
| 1960 | 10,065 | | — |
| 1970 | 10,460 | | 3.9% |
| 1980 | 10,095 | | −3.5% |
| 1990 | 9,245 | | −8.4% |
| 2000 | 8,662 | | −6.3% |
| 2010 | 9,363 | | 8.1% |
| 2020 | 9,161 | | −2.2% |
| 2021 (est.) | 9,457 | | 3.2% |
U.S. Decennial Census

=== 2010 census ===
As of the census of 2010, there were 9,365 people, 4,494 households, and 2,210 families living in the city. The population density was 3,672.5 inhabitants per square mile (1,418.0/km^{2}). There were 4,828 housing units at an average density of 1,893.3 per square mile (731.0/km^{2}). The racial makeup of the city was 88.8% White, 2.7% African American, 1.0% Native American, 2.1% Asian, 2.8% from other races, and 2.5% from two or more races. Hispanic or Latino of any race were 9.4% of the population.

There were 4,494 households, of which 19.8% had children under the age of 18 living with them, 36.6% were married couples living together, 8.7% had a female householder with no husband present, 3.9% had a male householder with no wife present, and 50.8% were non-families. 42.6% of all households were made up of individuals, and 13.7% had someone living alone who was 65 years of age or older. The average household size was 2.02 and the average family size was 2.80.

The median age in the city was 42 years. 15.9% of residents were under the age of 18; 8.6% were between the ages of 18 and 24; 29.3% were from 25 to 44; 28.8% were from 45 to 64; and 17.5% were 65 years of age or older. The gender makeup of the city was 48.6% male and 51.4% female.

=== 2000 census ===
As of the census of 2000, there were 8,662 people, 4,050 households, and 2,158 families living in the city. The population density was 3,421.7 people per square mile (1,321.9/km^{2}). There were 4,193 housing units at an average density of 1,656.4 per square mile (639.9/km^{2}). The racial makeup of the city was 93.77% White, 0.97% African American, 0.88% Native American, 1.05% Asian, 0.02% Pacific Islander, 1.50% from other races, and 1.81% from two or more races. Hispanic or Latino of any race were 4.53% of the population.

There were 4,050 households, out of which 21.8% had children under the age of 18 living with them, 41.0% were married couples living together, 8.7% had a female householder with no husband present, and 46.7% were non-families. 40.8% of all households were made up of individuals, and 13.9% had someone living alone who was 65 years of age or older. The average household size was 2.11 and the average family size was 2.88.

In the city, the population was spread out, with 19.3% under the age of 18, 8.9% from 18 to 24, 30.9% from 25 to 44, 23.0% from 45 to 64, and 17.9% who were 65 years of age or older. The median age was 40 years. For every 100 females, there were 96.1 males. For every 100 females age 18 and over, there were 92.7 males.

The median income for a household in the city was $36,721, and the median income for a family was $49,896. Males had a median income of $37,013 versus $27,129 for females. The per capita income for the city was $21,837. About 2.7% of families and 6.5% of the population were below the poverty line, including 4.6% of those under age 18 and 14.1% of those age 65 or over.

== Education ==
The Saint Francis School District, which provides public education for the area, includes three schools:

- Willow Glen Primary School (pre-kindergarten - 3rd Grade)
- Deer Creek Intermediate (4th - 8th grade)
- Saint Francis High School (9th - 12th grade)

== Notable residents ==
- Leo Joseph Brust, Roman Catholic bishop
- Daniel D. Hanna, Wisconsin State Representative
- Louise M. Tesmer, Wisconsin State Representative, Wisconsin Circuit Judge
