= West Bend, Iowa =

- City
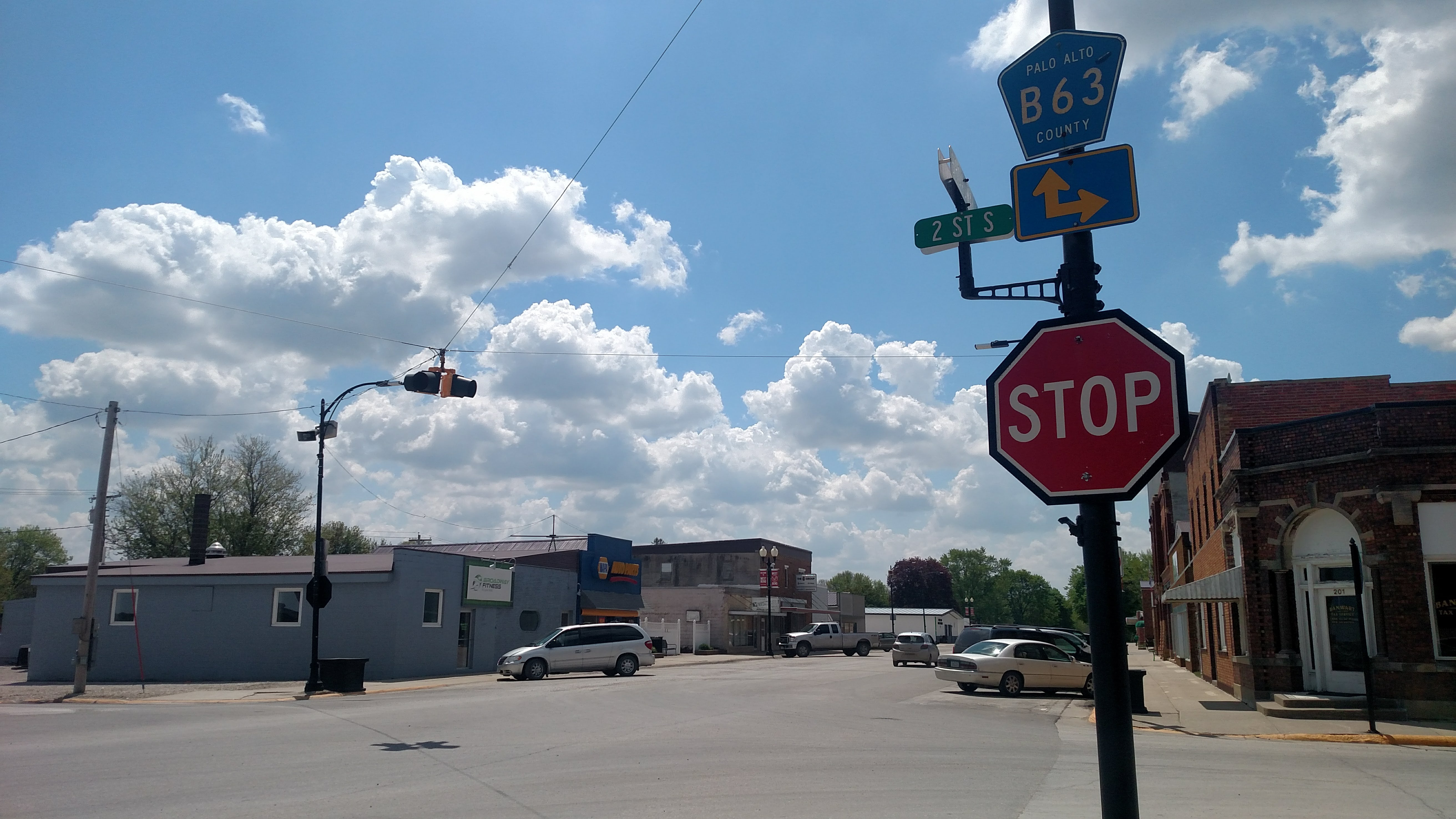
- Streetside in West Bend, Iowa
- Motto: "A Rock Solid Community"
- Location of West Bend, Iowa
- Coordinates: 42°57′36″N 94°26′45″W
- Country: US
- State: Iowa
- Counties: Palo Alto, Kossuth

Area
  - Total: 0.88 sq mi (2.27 km^{2})
  - Land: 0.88 sq mi (2.27 km^{2})
  - Water: 0 sq mi (0.00 km^{2})
- Elevation: 1,204 ft (367 m)

Population (2020)
  - Total: 791
  - Density: 901.9/sq mi (348.22/km^{2})
- Time zone: UTC-6 (Central (CST))
  - Summer (DST): UTC-5 (CDT)
- ZIP code: 50597
- Area code: 515
- FIPS code: 19-83550
- GNIS feature ID: 2397260
- Website: Village of West Bend, Iowa

West Bend is a city in Kossuth and Palo Alto counties in the U.S. state of Iowa. The population was 791 at the time of the 2020 census.

== History ==
West Bend got its start in the early 1880s, following the construction of the Burlington, Cedar Rapids and Northern Railway through that territory. It was originally called Ives after the president of the railroad, but the townspeople had it changed to West Bend from the bend in the river. West Bend (aka Ives) was the first town in Palo Alto County. A special five cent tax to build a railroad station was promised to the railroad if they would create a stop when the railroad was built, which was done.

== Geography ==
The city straddles the county line at 580th Avenue, in the southwest part of Kossuth County and the southeast part of Palo Alto County, in northwestern Iowa.

According to the United States Census Bureau, the city has a total area of 0.89 square miles (2.31 km^{2}), all land.

West Bend is served by a lightly used former branch line of the Rock Island Railroad now owned by the Union Pacific Railroad.

== Demographics ==
Historical populations
Year	Pop.	±%
1890	325	—
1900	538	+65.5%
1910	679	+26.2%
1920	969	+42.7%
1930	634	−34.6%
1940	737	+16.2%
1950	772	+4.7%
1960	910	+17.9%
1970	865	−4.9%
1980	941	+8.8%
1990	862	−8.4%
2000	834	−3.2%
2010	785	−5.9%
2020	791	+0.8%
Source:"U.S. Census website". United States Census Bureau. and Iowa Data Center; Source: U.S. Decennial Census

=== 2020 census ===
As of the census of 2020, there were 791 people, 351 households, and 226 families residing in the city. The population density was 901.9 inhabitants per square mile (348.2/km^{2}). There were 374 housing units at an average density of 426.4 per square mile (164.6/km^{2}). The racial makeup of the city was 92.4% White, 0.3% Black or African American, 0.3% Native American, 0.3% Asian, 0.0% Pacific Islander, 3.7% from other races and 3.2% from two or more races. Hispanic or Latino persons of any race comprised 5.6% of the population.

Of the 351 households, 22.5% of which had children under the age of 18 living with them, 53.6% were married couples living together, 3.1% were cohabitating couples, 26.5% had a female householder with no spouse or partner present and 16.8% had a male householder with no spouse or partner present. 35.6% of all households were non-families. 33.0% of all households were made up of individuals, 21.9% had someone living alone who was 65 years old or older.

The median age in the city was 52.8 years. 21.0% of the residents were under the age of 20; 5.1% were between the ages of 20 and 24; 18.3% were from 25 and 44; 21.7% were from 45 and 64; and 33.9% were 65 years of age or older. The gender makeup of the city was 46.4% male and 53.6% female.

=== 2010 census ===
As of the census of 2010, there were 785 people, 360 households, and 213 families living in the city. The population density was 882.0 inhabitants per square mile (340.5/km^{2}). There were 396 housing units at an average density of 444.9 units per square mile (171.8 units/km^{2}). The racial makeup of the city was 99.1% White, 0.1% Native American, and 0.8% from two or more races. Hispanic or Latino of any race were 1.4% of the population.

There were 360 households, of which 20.8% had children under the age of 18 living with them, 51.7% were married couples living together, 4.4% had a female householder with no husband present, 3.1% had a male householder with no wife present, and 40.8% were non-families. 38.1% of all households were made up of individuals, and 23.6% had someone living alone who was 65 years of age or older. The average household size was 2.07 and the average family size was 2.71.

The median age in the city was 51.6 years. 18.1% of residents were under the age of 18; 7.4% were between the ages of 18 and 24; 15.5% were from 25 to 44; 26.8% were from 45 to 64; and 32.2% were 65 years of age or older. The gender makeup of the city was 46.4% male and 53.6% female.

=== 2000 census ===
At the 2000 census, there were 834 people, 352 households and 210 families living in the city. The population density was 943.3 inhabitants per square mile (364.2/km^{2}). There were 379 housing units at an average density of 428.7 units per square mile (165.5 units/km^{2}). The racial makeup of the city was 99.40% White, 0.12% Native American, 0.12% Asian, and 0.36% from two or more races. Hispanic or Latino of any race were 0.48% of the population.

There were 352 households, of which 25.0% had children under the age of 18 living with them, 54.8% were married couples living together, 3.1% had a female householder with no husband present, and 40.1% were non-families. 37.2% of all households were made up of individuals, and 24.4% had someone living alone who was 65 years of age or older. The average household size was 2.21 and the average family size was 2.95.

Age distribution was 22.1% under the age of 18, 6.0% from 18 to 24, 20.5% from 25 to 44, 20.6% from 45 to 64, and 30.8% who were 65 years of age or older. The median age was 46 years. For every 100 females, there were 86.6 males. For every 100 females age 18 and over, there were 83.6 males.

The median household income was $31,711, and the median family income was $40,455. Males had a median income of $31,083 versus $20,000 for females. The per capita income for the city was $18,804. About 4.1% of families and 6.9% of the population were below the poverty line, including 7.8% of those under age 18 and 7.2% of those age 65 or over.

== Attractions ==
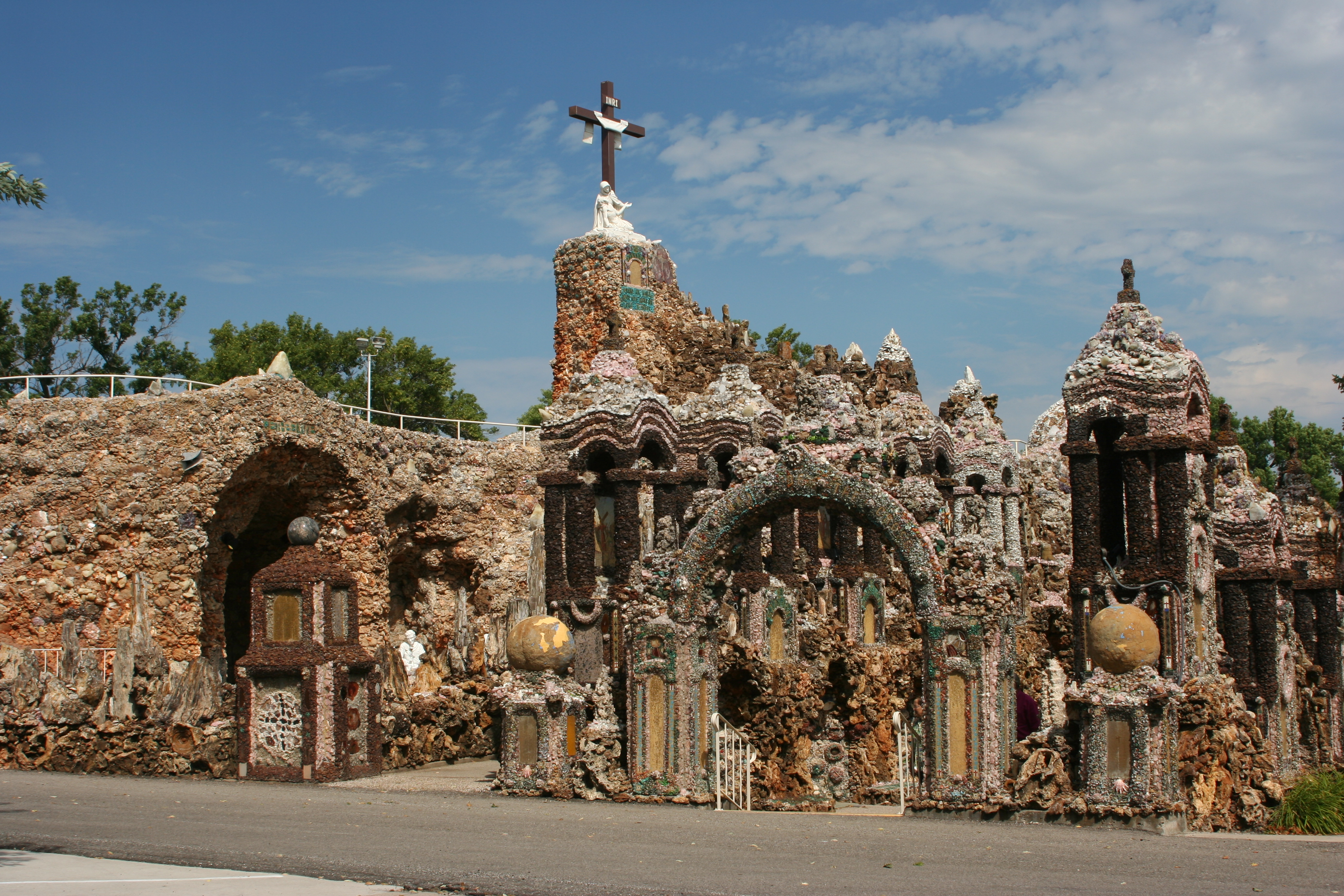
Grotto of the Redemption

West Bend is the site of the Grotto of the Redemption, a series of nine contiguous grottos occupying a full city block, constructed of minerals, petrifications, and semiprecious gems.

== Education ==
West Bend is part of the West Bend–Mallard Community School District, established by the merger of the West Bend and Mallard school districts in 1995.

== Notable person ==
- Paul Dobberstein, German American priest and architect, most famous for constructing the Grotto of the Redemption; resident of West Bend
