= Dickeyville, Wisconsin =

- Village
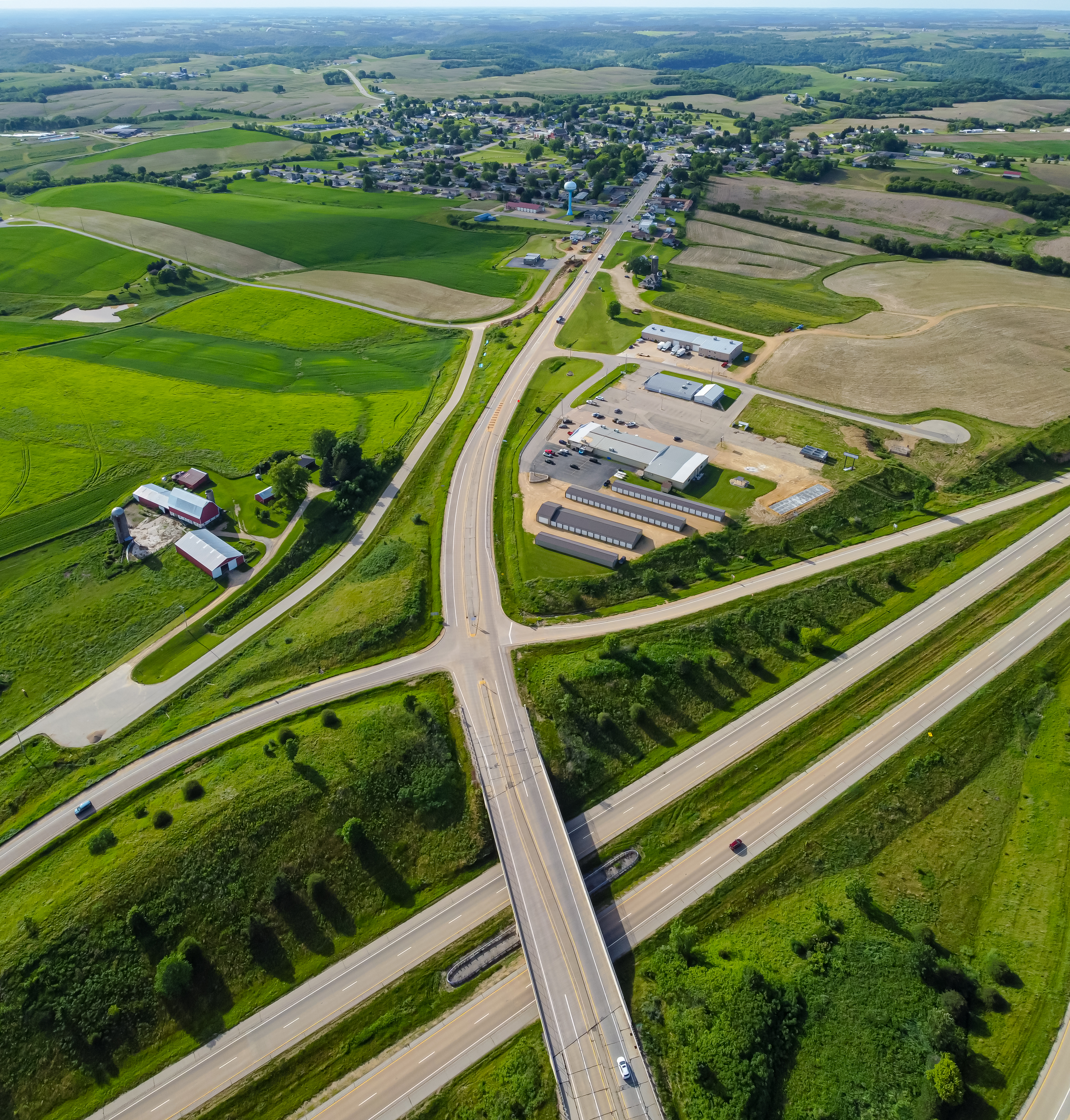
- US-151 and US-61/Wis-35 junction by town

- Location of Dickeyville in Grant County, Wisconsin.
- Coordinates: 42°37′36″N 90°35′32″W
- Country: United States
- State: Wisconsin
- County: Grant

Area
  - Total: 1.01 sq mi (2.62 km^{2})
  - Land: 1.01 sq mi (2.62 km^{2})
  - Water: 0 sq mi (0.00 km^{2})
- Elevation: 968 ft (295 m)

Population (2020)
  - Total: 1,015
  - Density: 1,000/sq mi (387/km^{2})
- Time zone: UTC-6 (Central (CST))
  - Summer (DST): UTC-5 (CDT)
- Area code: 608
- FIPS code: 55-20175
- GNIS feature ID: 1583085
- Website: www.dickeyville.com

Dickeyville is a village in Grant County, Wisconsin, United States. The population was 1,015 at the 2020 census.

The Dickeyville Grotto is located in the heart of the village.

== History ==
Dickeyville was not formally platted. The village was named for Charles Dickey, who opened a general store in the early 1840s. He was also the first postmaster when the post office was established (as Dickeysville) in 1849.

== Geography ==
According to the United States Census Bureau, the village has a total area of 0.88 square miles (2.28 km^{2}), all land.

Located approximately halfway between the larger cities of Platteville, Wisconsin and Dubuque, Iowa, Dickeyville largely serves as a bedroom community.

== Demographics ==
Historical population
Census	Pop.	Note	%±
1950	269		—
1960	671		149.4%
1970	1,057		57.5%
1980	1,156		9.4%
1990	862		−25.4%
2000	1,043		21.0%
2010	1,061		1.7%
2020	1,015		−4.3%
U.S. Decennial Census

=== 2010 census ===
As of the census of 2010, there were 1,061 people, 459 households, and 289 families living in the village. The population density was 1,205.7 inhabitants per square mile (465.5/km^{2}). There were 471 housing units at an average density of 535.2 per square mile (206.6/km^{2}). The racial makeup of the village was 99.1% White, 0.2% African American, 0.4% from other races, and 0.4% from two or more races. Hispanic or Latino of any race were 1.1% of the population.

There were 459 households, of which 28.5% had children under the age of 18 living with them, 54.5% were married couples living together, 6.5% had a female householder with no husband present, 2.0% had a male householder with no wife present, and 37.0% were non-families. 31.8% of all households were made up of individuals, and 12.9% had someone living alone who was 65 years of age or older. The average household size was 2.31 and the average family size was 2.93.

The median age in the village was 40.7 years. 24% of residents were under the age of 18; 5.5% were between the ages of 18 and 24; 25.6% were from 25 to 44; 24.8% were from 45 to 64; and 20.1% were 65 years of age or older. The gender makeup of the village was 49.6% male and 50.4% female.

=== 2000 census ===
As of the census of 2000, there were 1,043 people, 420 households, and 299 families living in the village. The population density was 1,197.3 people per square mile (462.9/km^{2}). There were 431 housing units at an average density of 494.8 per square mile (191.3/km^{2}). The racial makeup of the village was 99.52% White, 0.29% Asian, and 0.19% from two or more races. Hispanic or Latino of any race were 0.29% of the population.

There were 420 households, out of which 28.1% had children under the age of 18 living with them, 62.9% were married couples living together, 6.9% had a female householder with no husband present, and 28.8% were non-families. 25.5% of all households were made up of individuals, and 10.7% had someone living alone who was 65 years of age or older. The average household size was 2.48 and the average family size was 2.96.

In the village, the population was spread out, with 24.6% under the age of 18, 8.1% from 18 to 24, 26.8% from 25 to 44, 24.8% from 45 to 64, and 15.5% who were 65 years of age or older. The median age was 38 years. For every 100 females, there were 97.2 males. For every 100 females age 18 and over, there were 96.0 males.

The median income for a household in the village was $47,353, and the median income for a family was $56,875. Males had a median income of $32,625 versus $26,944 for females. The per capita income for the village was $23,147. About 6.9% of families and 11.7% of the population were below the poverty line, including 20.4% of those under age 18 and 3.8% of those age 65 or over.

== Notable person ==
- Bill Burbach, professional baseball player.
