= History of Dubuque, Iowa =

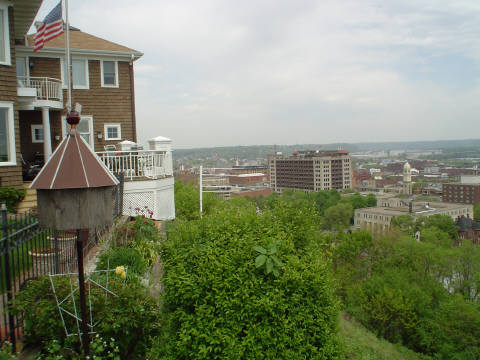
Downtown and North Dubuque, Iowa, looking north from the Fourth Street Elevator.

The city of Dubuque, Iowa stretches back over 200 years, when Julien Dubuque first settled in the area in the late 18th century. Within the modern era, the city has focused on subjects such as flooding, racial issues, and redevelopment.

== Settlement ==
Dubuque was the first permanent European settlement in what would become the state of Iowa. This area was important in the French-Indian fur trading culture; the earliest record of lead mining dates to 1690 and the French trader, Nicholas Perrot. In 1788, Julien Dubuque was granted rights by the Meskwaki people to mine their land for lead; he settled near the mouth of Catfish Creek. Dubuque, for whom the city is named, is considered to be the first white man to settle in Iowa. Julien Dubuque's tomb remains a local landmark.

== Development ==
In 1833, the area where Julien Dubuque settled and worked was opened up to settlement by the United States Government. Miners created a settlement, this settlement eventually became the city of Dubuque. The religious community began with St. Luke's United Methodist Church. It is the oldest Methodist church in the state. Its origins trace back to the founding of the city; when Methodist ministers arrived and began work with the miners of the time. A small Catholic parish was established 1833. It eventually became the Saint Raphael's Cathedral parish. A Catholic church council recommended to Pope Gregory XVI that three new dioceses be created, one of which was at Dubuque. In 1837, the Dubuque Diocese was created, and Mathias Loras was appointed as a bishop. When he arrived in Dubuque, there were only a few priests to cover a large area that consisted of several states.

Bishop Loras encouraged large numbers of immigrants to come to the area from the crowded cities in the eastern US. Many immigrants settled in Dubuque and the surrounding area. Also, immigrants tended to gather with other immigrants from the same ethnic background: this often helped with their assimilation into their new nation.

Many Irish families came to the area because of cheap land and mining jobs. For many years, Irish families mainly settled in an area was often referred to as Little Dublin.

They were followed by a small group of Germans. Over the years, the German population grew until Germans became one of the two main ethnic groups in the city.

While other groups, such as Hispanics and African Americans, have become more prominent over the years, many living in Dubuque are descendants of German and Irish immigrants.

== Civil War ==
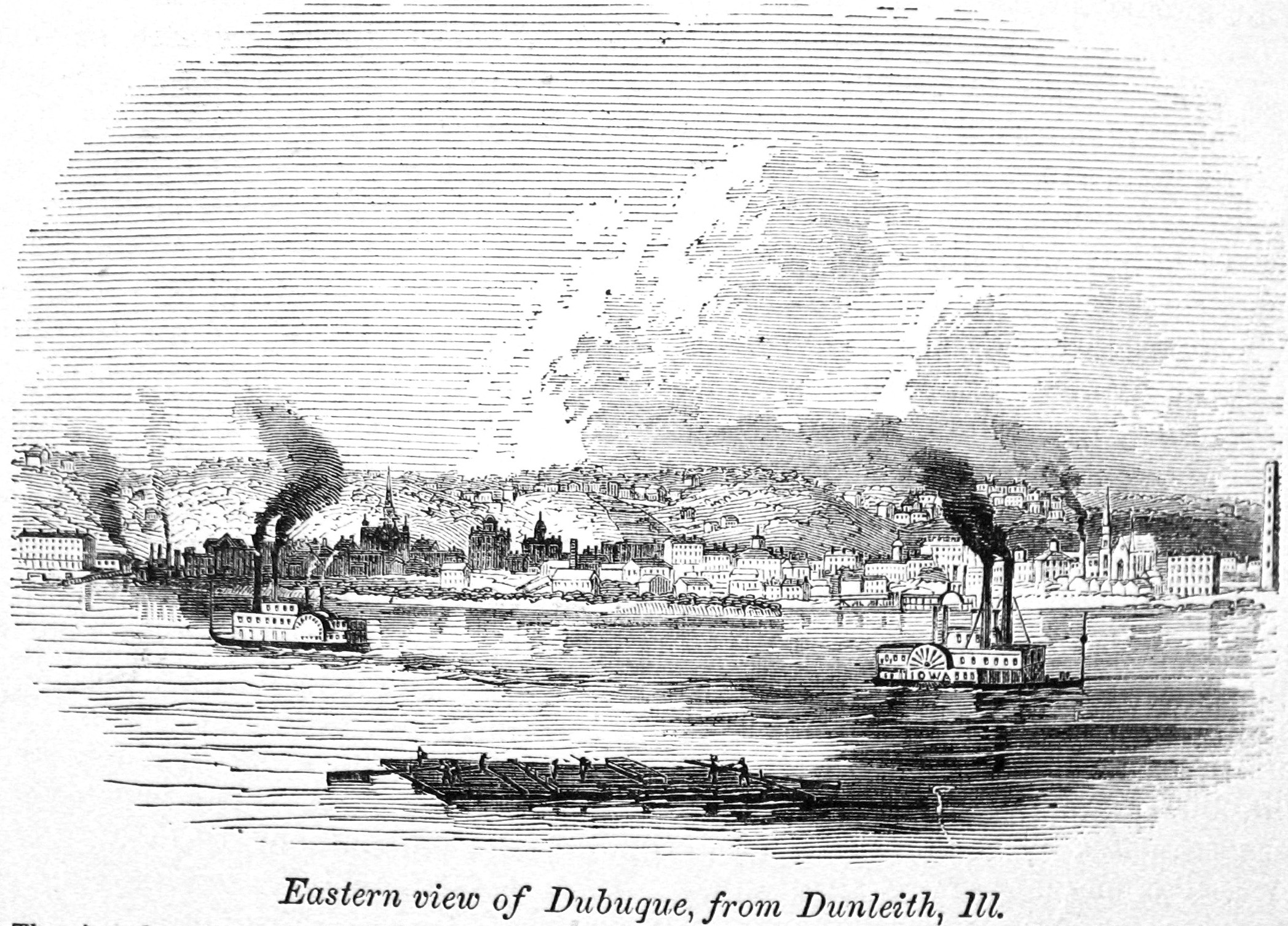
Dubuque in 1865.

A number of people living in Dubuque served their nation in this war. A few of these people went on to play an important role in government. David Bremner Henderson was a Representative in the US House, and was Speaker at the turn of the century. He was wounded in the war and lost a leg. William Boyd Allison also served in the war. Afterwards, he later served in both houses of Congress. Allison Henderson park on the corners of University Avenue and Grandview Avenue is named for the two men.

A few Dubuque citizens found themselves in trouble with the government during the war. George Wallace Jones was imprisoned on a charge of disloyalty based upon correspondence with Jefferson Davis. Newspaper publisher Dennis Mahony was also imprisoned for several months in 1862 for editorials that were critical of the government.

Many Catholics and immigrants in Dubuque were opposed to the Republican party because parts of the Know Nothings movement who had harassed them had been absorbed into the Republican party. It caused trouble for both groups when the President and other government officials misinterpreted this opposition as disloyalty. This was responsible, in part, for Dubuque becoming a stronghold for the Democratic party.

== Post-Civil War ==
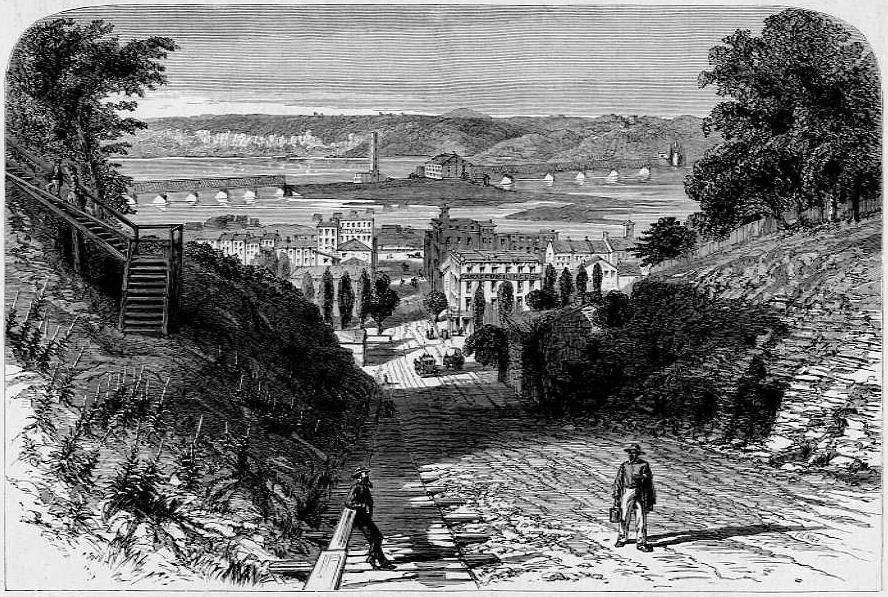
Bridges on the Mississippi, at Dubuque, an 1872 wood engraving

The years following the war were ones of growth and expansion for Dubuque. When the Milwaukee Railroad Shops opened in Dubuque, a population explosion occurred when a number of young German families moved to the area in search of jobs.

Lead mining no longer played a central role in the city. Now, Dubuque was becoming a transportation center due to its position on the Mississippi River. Also, the lumber industry had a large presence in Dubuque.

The Ku Klux Klan was an unwelcome presence at times in the area. In the 1920s, at the height of its power, Klan influence became visible in the area. Several crosses were burned in the area over an 18-month time period. One Klan meeting near the Center Grove section of the city degenerated into a huge fight when anti-klan demonstrators attacked Klan members. In 1925, the Klan held a gathering which they called a "Konklave." The Klan claimed over 50,000 people attended the rally. The Klan held another "Konklave" as well as a parade.

Fortunately, the influence of the Klan soon began to weaken. National scandals and power struggles weakened the Klan, which was mirrored locally. The Klan had pretty much disappeared from the public view for a number of years.

Most recently, during the 1990s, there was a brief resurgence of the Klan's presence in Dubuque. Appropriate actions were taken and the Klan's presence has since disappeared.

== Modern history ==
Following the World War II, John Deere built its manufacturing plant on a parcel of land adjoining the Mississippi River north of Dubuque, opening it in 1947. This plant, which today builds construction equipment became one of the major employers in the Dubuque area.

As television gained in popularity, area residents found that the geography of Dubuque made reception of over the air television signals difficult in some parts of the city. In response, a cable television system was developed in Dubuque during the mid-1950s. This made the Dubuque cable system one of the earlier systems to be developed in the country. The development of the Dubuque cable system meant that most homes in the lower lying regions of the city did not have television antennas - which was one of the main reasons why the city was chosen as a location for the movie F.I.S.T. Today, Mediacom runs the Dubuque cable system.

=== Floods ===
Downtown Dubuque during the floods of 1965.

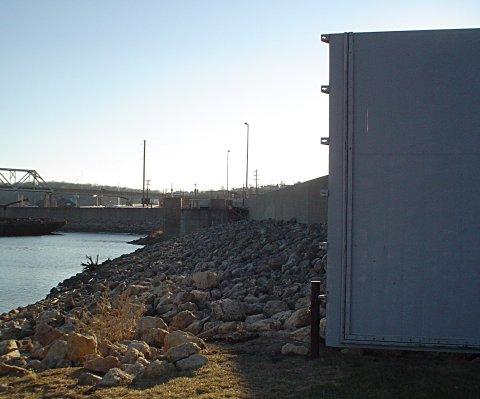
A portion of the flood wall built to protect the city from flooding.

The city was the site of several disastrous floods over the years when the Mississippi River went over its banks.

Flood of 1965 was one of the worst in the state's history. In Dubuque, water crested 9.8 feet (3.0 m) above flood stage. Locals created dykes out of sandbags.

Following the 1965 flood, funds were sought from the Federal government for the installation of a floodwall. This floodwall was finally built in the late 1960s. When the entire Midwest was prone to widespread floods in 1993 the floodwall helped keep the city from experiencing serious flooding, while other cities—such as Davenport, Iowa—sustained major damage.

In 1999, a major flood devastated Dubuque prompting the city to take action against them. The most notable action was the "daylighting" of the Bee Branch Creek.

=== Racial problems ===
In 1989, a cross was burned and found, next to the garage of an African-American family which caught fire. In the ruins, parts of the cross were found, with written in it "KKK Lives" and "Nigger". Another cross was burned a few weeks later. This was found to be the work of a group of young men who were well known racists - several members already had criminal records. Those responsible eventually were convicted and sent to prison.

In 1992, the Ku Klux Klan held a rally in downtown Dubuque. To counter the Klan rally, the city held a free diversity public gathering at Dubuque's Eagle Point Park.

At about the same time, the city embarked on a plan to encourage more minorities to move to the area. John Deere encouraged more minorities to work for their factory in the city. Some of the critics tried to stir up fear by telling people that the city was planning on taking a bus to a large city and grab the first 100 African-Americans that they found. In reality, the city was planning on making a recruiting drive to bring African-American professionals to the city.

The city's program, and the cross burning polarized the community. People took up strongly held views. Dubuque police had to be summoned to Dubuque's Senior High School at one point because racial tensions almost boiled over into a large fight at the school. Jim Brady, who was mayor at the time, had even gone to the schools in Dubuque to talk about his experiences with racism over the years. When the Guardian Angels arrived in Dubuque, it was felt that their presence would only complicate the matter.

There were two more cross burnings in 2016.

As of January 2020, an estimated 3,000 African Americans lived in the city.

=== Westward migration ===
During the latter half of the 20th century, residents and businesses of Dubuque began migrating out primarily to the western part of the city. This movement has changed the face of many areas of the city, and pushed out the western borders of Dubuque. Many homes and businesses were built on areas that were once farm fields in "the middle of nowhere."

Following World War II, the baby boom impacted Dubuque. A number of these young families settled in the west end. Areas that were once fields were turned into housing for these young families, and Dubuque began pushing westward. Because of this, the Archdiocese of Dubuque opened Wahlert High School—a central parochial high school. The Dubuque Community School District opened Hempstead High School—the city's second public high school—in 1970.

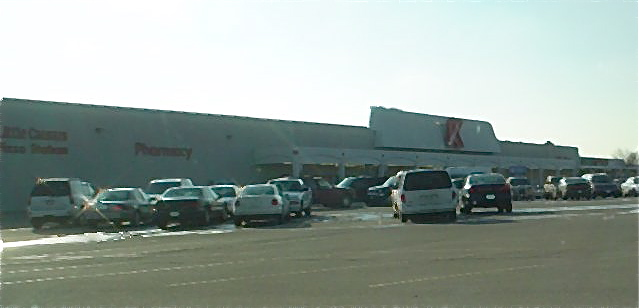
The Dubuque Kmart. This Kmart has the distinction of being the first Kmart in Iowa.

During this time, a number of new businesses were established in Dubuque. The S. S. Kresge Corporation opened a new Kmart on a parcel of land on what was once the western border of Dubuque. This was the first Kmart in Iowa. Target Stores opened their own location about a mile west of Kmart it the late 1970s. In 1970, the first stores at Kennedy Mall—the first indoor, climate-controlled mall in Iowa—were opened.

A number of businesses moved to the western part of the city. In 1964, Montgomery Ward decided to move their store from the downtown out to the west end. Both Wards and Roshek's Department Store moved into Kennedy Mall when it was opened. In the 1980s, both JCPenney and Sears moved their stores from the downtown out to Kennedy Mall.

This westward migration had redefined the lower main street area. Instead of being the main shopping area of the city, it became mostly a business park. After hours and on weekends, the area was deserted. The city has made a number of efforts to increase the importance of the downtown area once again.

=== City redevelopment efforts ===
In recent years, the city of Dubuque has made a concerted effort to redevelop the downtown and riverfront areas. This included a number of controversial decisions. But so far most people seem to have positive opinions of the redevelopment efforts.

In the downtown area, the gas station featured in Field of Dreams was torn down to make way for expanded parking spots for downtown businesses. In the years following that decision, the Bricktown Restaurant opened in the building behind the gas station after the owners made major improvements to the building. The local Historic Preservation Commission had recommended that the gas station remain intact, however the city government overrode their decision.

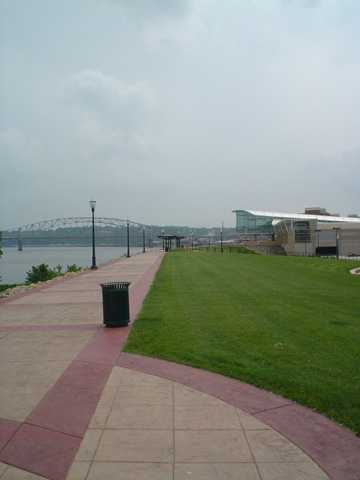
Dubuque's River Walk

A number of redevelopment efforts focused on the riverfront just north of the Ice Harbor. This was part of the America's River project. It included a newly expanded National Mississippi River Museum and Aquarium. Private investors built the Grand Harbor Resort and Waterpark on the riverfront. The Grand River Events Center was built next door as a place to host events for parties ranging from very small to very large parties. The nearby old Dubuque Star Brewery has also been renovated into spaces for businesses.

Developers proposed building a stadium near the Ice Harbor for a minor league baseball team, however, the plans were abandoned when a tax levy to help fund this stadium was voted down by the residents.

Developers have also recently begun construction efforts on the area at the bottom of the bluffs which the Eagle Point Park is located on. They plan to build condominiums at the base of the bluffs. This has caused controversy in that people feel that having buildings there would take away from the natural beauty of the area. The controversy gained further momentum when it was found that several rockslides had taken place after construction efforts had begun. The rockslides led to concern that construction efforts may be causing geological instability in the bluffs.

The Dubuque Community School District has decided to replace a downtown elementary school building with a new building a short distance away. This plan has run into opposition by historic preservation interests, who claim this would result in the destruction of several historic buildings. After considering the options, the district decided to go ahead with building the new school, and has purchased the properties to be demolished. A section of W. 12th street has been closed off. The street has been taken out to make way for the new school building, named Prescott Elementary.

The development of new hotels has led to what the industry has termed as a surplus in the market - especially with the addition of the Grand Harbor Hotel and a new Hilton hotel at the Dubuque Greyhound Park and Casino. Because of this the Best Western Dubuque Inn has been sold. Part of it was torn down, and the remaining portion is being remodeled into a new hotel scheduled to open in the spring of 2006. The Dubuque Inn's owners also own the local Days Inn, which they have put up for sale as well. The owners of those two properties have said that their occupancy was often less than 50%.
