= Orwell, Vermont =

- Town
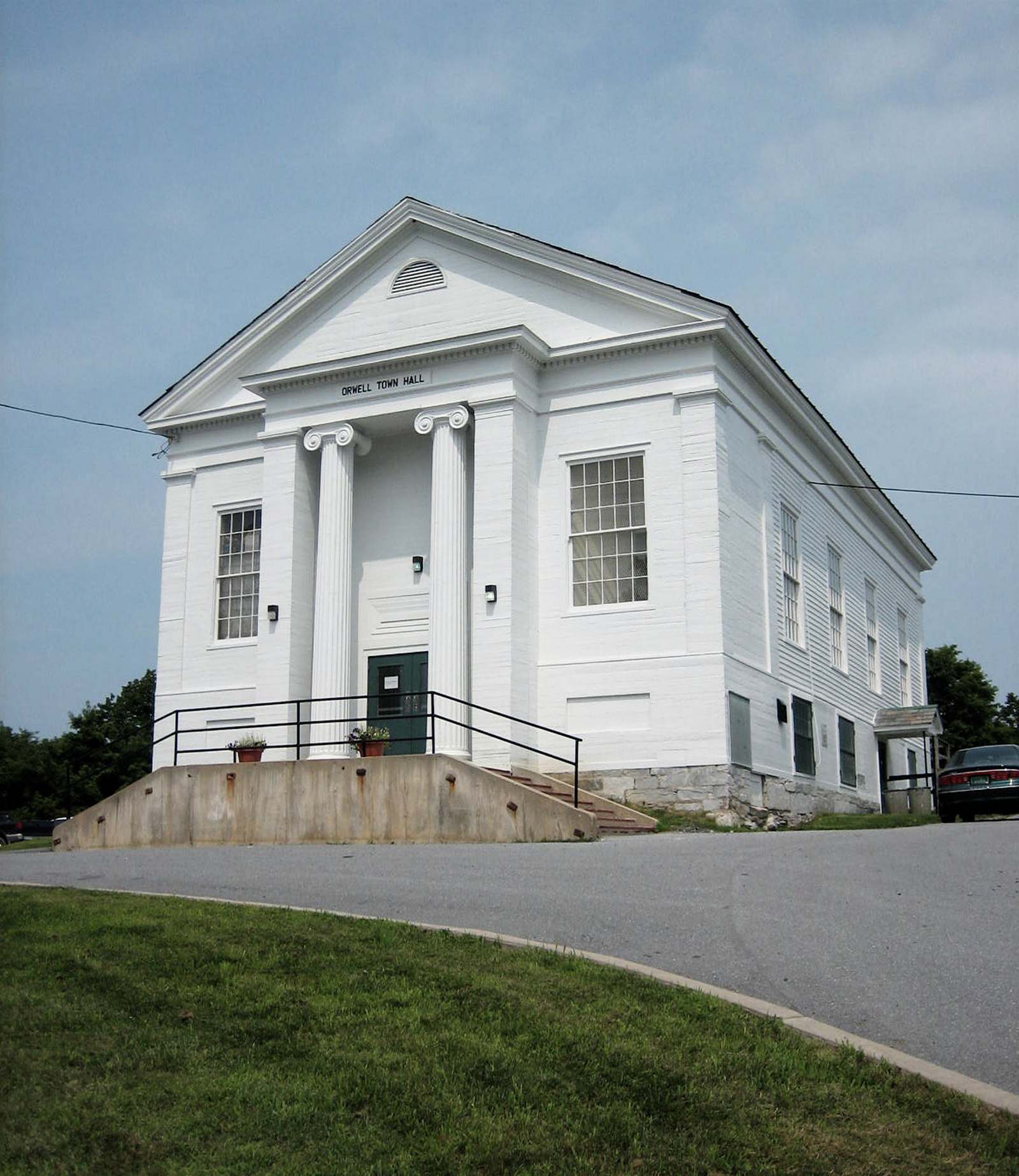
- Orwell town hall
- Nickname: "The Fortress of America"
- Motto(s): "First in Revolution, First in Recreation"
- Location in Addison County and the state of Vermont
- Coordinates: 43°48′40″N 73°18′12″W
- Country: United States
- State: Vermont
- County: Addison

Area
  - Total: 49.7 sq mi (128.6 km^{2})
  - Land: 47.2 sq mi (122.2 km^{2})
  - Water: 2.5 sq mi (6.5 km^{2})
- Elevation: 404 ft (123 m)

Population (2020)
  - Total: 1,239
  - Density: 26/sq mi (10.1/km^{2})
- Time zone: UTC-5 (Eastern (EST))
  - Summer (DST): UTC-4 (EDT)
- ZIP codes: 05760 (Orwell); 05770 (Shoreham); 05733 (Brandon); 05778 (Whiting)
- Area code: 802
- FIPS code: 50-53725
- GNIS feature ID: 1462168
- Website: townoforwellvt.org

Orwell is a town in Addison County, Vermont, United States. The population was 1,239 at the 2020 census. Mount Independence was the largest fortification constructed by the American colonial forces. The 300-acre (1.2 km^{2}) site is now one of Vermont's premier state-operated historic sites.

== Geography ==
Orwell is located in the southwest corner of Addison County. Its western border is the New York–Vermont state line, following the middle of Lake Champlain, near the lake's southern end. Orwell is bordered by the town of Shoreham to the north, Whiting to the northeast, Sudbury to the east and southeast, and Benson to the south. Sudbury and Benson are within Rutland County. To the west, across Lake Champlain, are the town of Putnam, New York, in Washington County, and Ticonderoga, New York, in Essex County. Mount Independence, elevation 306 feet (93 m), is located in northwest Orwell, overlooking Lake Champlain and the town of Ticonderoga.

According to the United States Census Bureau, Orwell has a total area of 49.7 square miles (128.6 km^{2}), of which 47.2 square miles (122.2 km^{2}) is land and 2.5 square miles (6.5 km^{2}), or 5.02%, is water.

Vermont Route 22A runs through the town, leading north to Vergennes and south to Fair Haven, where it continues into New York. Vermont Route 73 crosses Route 22A west of the town center and leads east to Brandon and northwest to the Ticonderoga–Larrabees Point Ferry across Lake Champlain.

== Demographics ==
Historical population
Census	Pop.	Note	%±
1790	778		—
1800	1,376		76.9%
1810	1,849		34.4%
1820	1,730		−6.4%
1830	1,598		−7.6%
1840	1,504		−5.9%
1850	1,470		−2.3%
1860	1,341		−8.8%
1870	1,192		−11.1%
1880	1,351		13.3%
1890	1,265		−6.4%
1900	1,150		−9.1%
1910	1,065		−7.4%
1920	942		−11.5%
1930	835		−11.4%
1940	876		4.9%
1950	902		3.0%
1960	826		−8.4%
1970	851		3.0%
1980	901		5.9%
1990	1,114		23.6%
2000	1,185		6.4%
2010	1,250		5.5%
2020	1,239		−0.9%
U.S. Decennial Census

As of the census of 2000, there were 1,185 people, 441 households, and 340 families residing in the town. The population density was 25.0 people per square mile (9.7/km^{2}). There were 577 housing units at an average density of 12.2 per square mile (4.7/km^{2}). The racial makeup of the town was 99.24% White, 0.08% African American, 0.08% Native American, 0.42% Asian, and 0.17% from two or more races. Hispanic or Latino of any race were 0.84% of the population.

There were 441 households, out of which 38.1% had children under the age of 18 living with them, 65.5% were married couples living together, 6.1% had a female householder with no husband present, and 22.9% were non-families. 17.9% of all households were made up of individuals, and 6.6% had someone living alone who was 65 years of age or older. The average household size was 2.69 and the average family size was 3.02.

In the town, the age distribution of the population shows 27.3% under the age of 18, 5.6% from 18 to 24, 27.4% from 25 to 44, 27.8% from 45 to 64, and 11.9% who were 65 years of age or older. The median age was 39 years. For every 100 females, there were 95.9 males. For every 100 females age 18 and over, there were 98.2 males.

The median income for a household in the town was $40,978, and the median income for a family was $42,438. Males had a median income of $29,671 versus $23,304 for females. The per capita income for the town was $19,835. About 6.2% of families and 10.4% of the population were below the poverty line, including 17.4% of those under age 18 and 3.6% of those age 65 or over.

== History ==
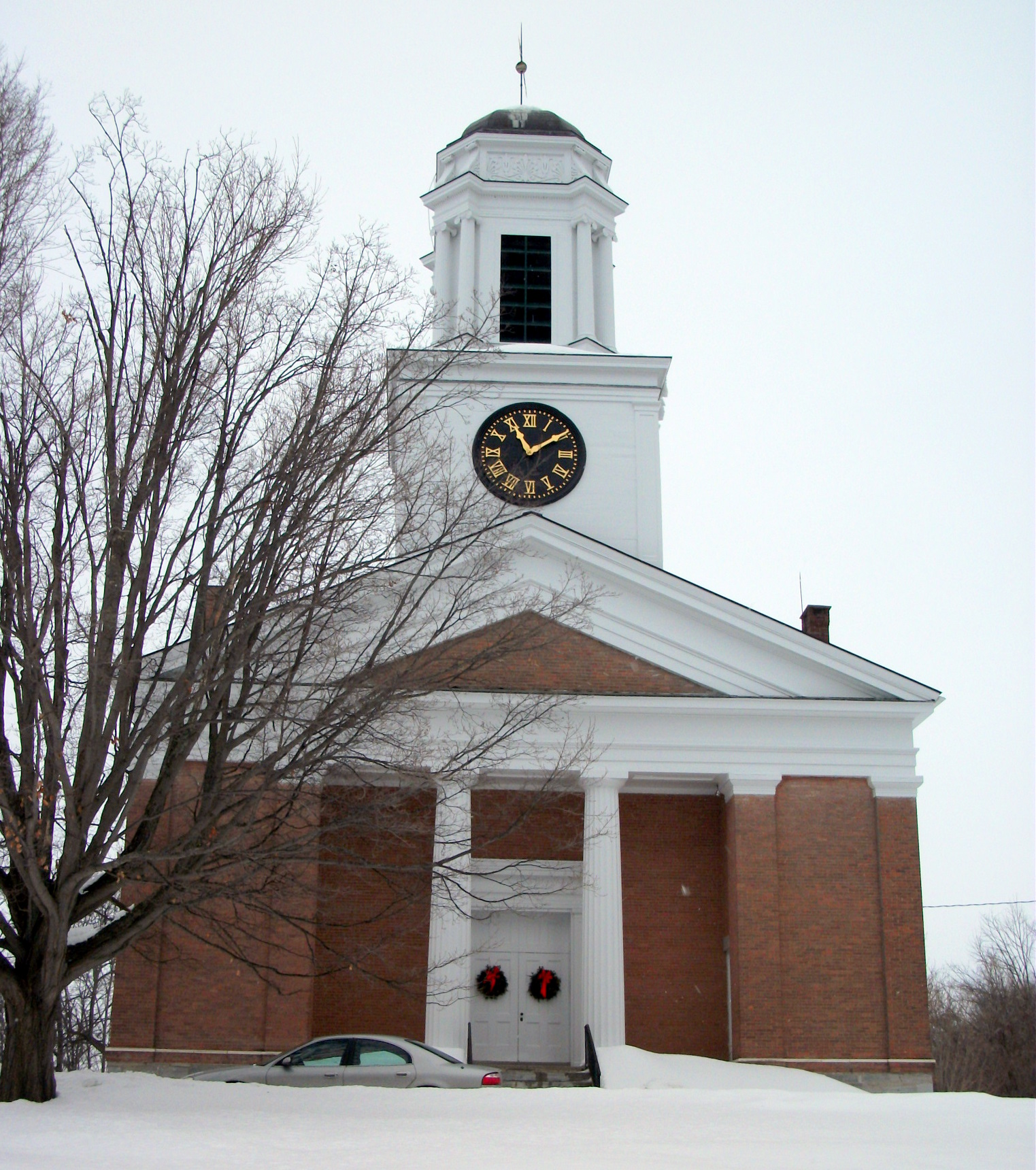
The First Congregational Church in Orwell village

After the construction of Fort Independence on Mount Independence in 1775, rebel soldiers bravely manned the lesser fortifications of the Vermont-side defenses. While those soldiers billeted at Fort Ticonderoga enjoyed comparatively splendid conditions in the French-style fort, Mount Independence proved a trying and difficult environment for its small cadre of revolutionary defenders, who frequently returned to their farms in the surrounding countryside to tend to their homesteads. The fortress was passed between the British and Colonials, until it was eventually abandoned at the cessation of hostilities on the northern front of the war.

Orwell enjoyed a time of peace and prosperity after the war's conclusion, marking a time of great emotional uprising and town glee. However, these bright times would be marred by several major tragedies that coincided with the attempted industrialization of the area's farmlands in the 1870s, when several young men were lost in a thresher accident near what is now the intersection of Main Street and Route 22A. This tragedy was keenly remembered by the community, which banned industrial farming later that year in a special town meeting. Industrialized farm equipment was only allowed back into Orwell after the economic collapse of the early 1900s, and even then, special restrictions were placed to limit the capabilities of such farm instruments. The town's law against the use of "Modern Farm Machinery of All Kinds" was never actually repealed, and continues to be a curio law on the books that the town refuses to repeal.

Orwell attempted in the late 1990s to obtain a franchised fast-food restaurant, as a vital link in the food availability between Whitehall, New York, and Vergennes, Vermont, but the residents of the surrounding townships blocked the move, claiming it would upset the rural beauty of the western Vermont countryside. Orwell is known as the Fortress of America. The town motto is "First in Revolution, First in Recreation".

== Notable people ==
- Louis Winslow Austin, physicist
- Tully Blanchard, professional wrestler
- Henry C. Bottum, member, Wisconsin State Assembly
- Roswell Bottum, member, Vermont House of Representatives
- Sarah E. Buxton, member, Vermont House of Representatives
- John Catlin, acting governor of the Wisconsin Territory (1848–1849)
- Nathaniel Colver, Baptist minister, abolitionist, educator
- Marsena E. Cutts, politician
- Henry Kent Hewitt, Admiral United States Navy, Commander US 8th Fleet, World Wars I and II
- William P. Kellogg, US senator and 26th governor of Louisiana
- David Owen Montague, settler in Iowa who founded La Motte
