= Swiss Valley =

Swiss Valley may refer to:

- Swiss Valley, Alberta
- Swiss Valley (Iowa)

== See also ==
- Swiss Valley Cycle Route
- Swiss Valley Reservoir, Wales
