= La Motte, Iowa =

- City
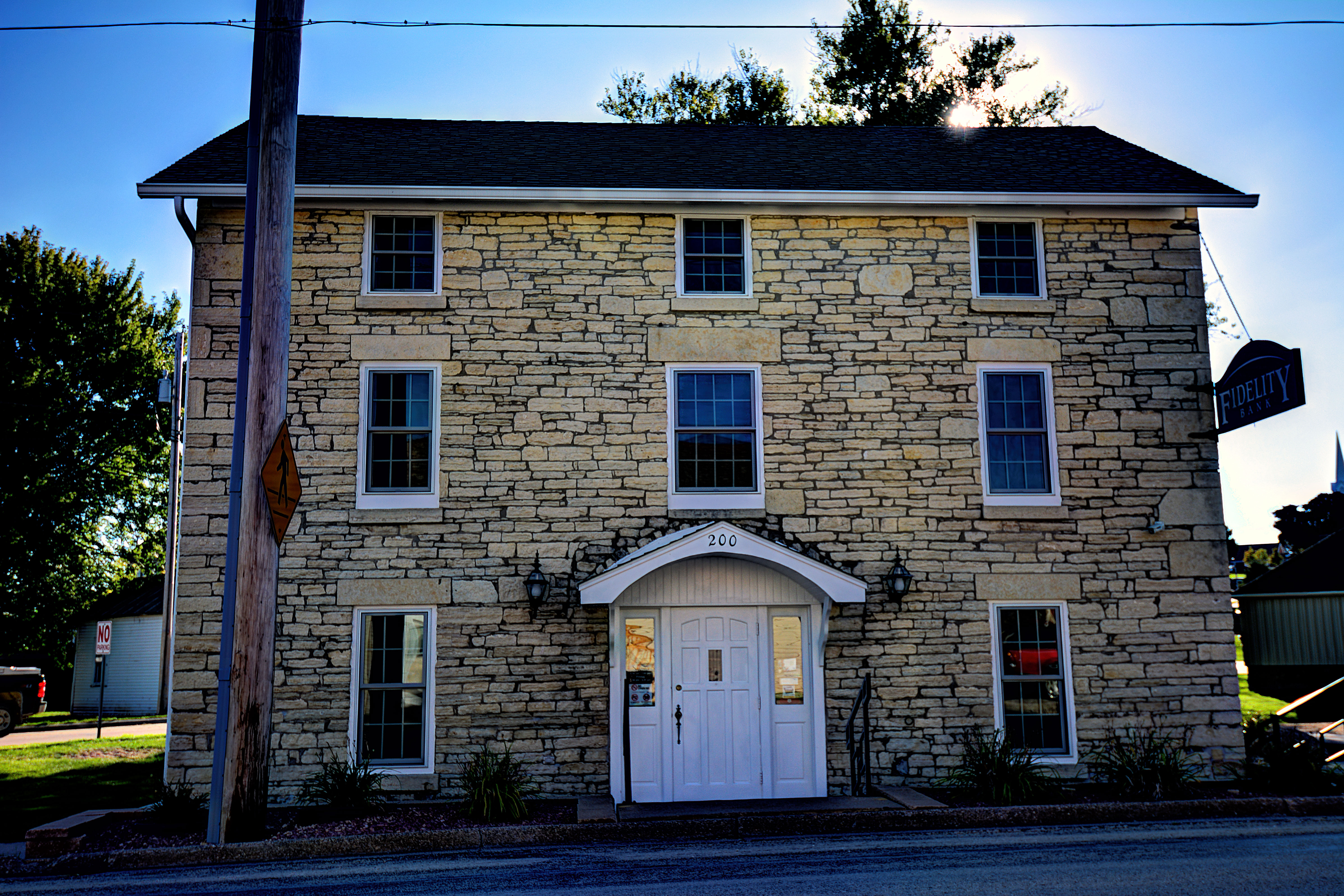
- The Harris Wagon and Carriage Shop

- Location of La Motte, Iowa
- Coordinates: 42°17′47″N 90°37′32″W
- Country: United States
- State: Iowa
- County: Jackson
- Incorporated: May 24, 1879
- Founder: Alexander La Motte

Area
  - Total: 0.45 sq mi (1.17 km^{2})
  - Land: 0.45 sq mi (1.17 km^{2})
  - Water: 0 sq mi (0.00 km^{2})
- Elevation: 945 ft (288 m)

Population (2020)
  - Total: 237
  - Density: 522.6/sq mi (201.79/km^{2})
- Time zone: UTC-6 (Central (CST))
  - Summer (DST): UTC-5 (CDT)
- ZIP code: 52054
- Area code: 563
- FIPS code: 19-43050
- GNIS feature ID: 2395568
- Website: lamotteia.com

La Motte is a small city in northern Jackson County, Iowa, United States. The population was 237 at the time of the 2020 census. The town was started in the nineteenth century by several settlers from the Eastern United States including Alexander La Motte and David Owen Montague.

== History ==
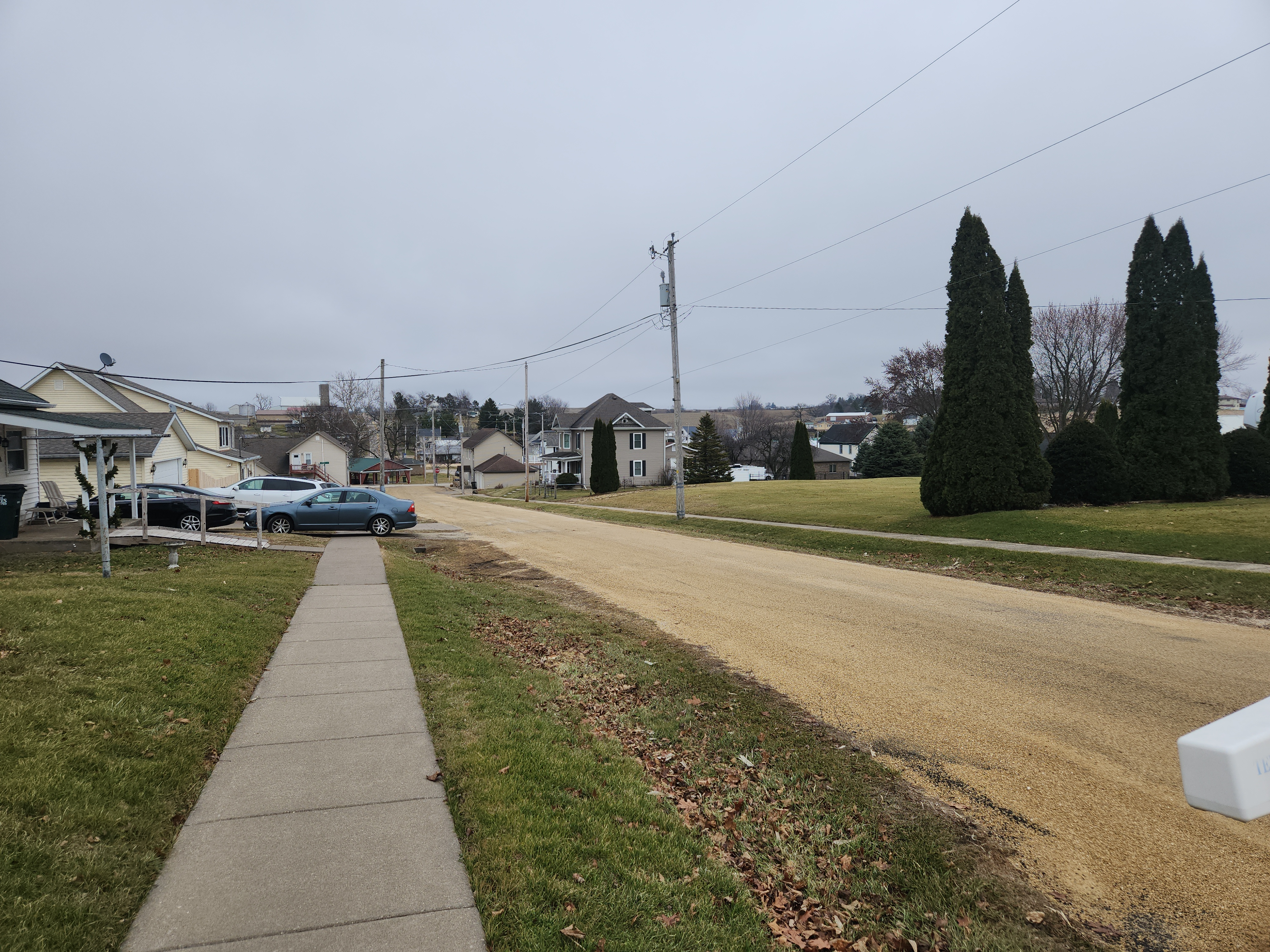
The City of La Motte, looking into the center town

David Owen Montague arrived in Jackson County, Iowa, from New York in 1838 and settled in the area of La Motte in 1843. The city is named after Alexander La Motte, one of its founders. La Motte was a Frenchman abandoned by his father in New York City prospecting for lead in the area. In 1846, a rail line was run through La Motte, connecting it to Dubuque and Davenport. The next year, 1847, the land that would be incorporated in the city was bought for $1.25 per acre. La Motte was planned in 1873, and the town voted to incorporate in 1879.

In 1878, La Motte contained two stores, a Methodist church, a Masonic lodge, and a carriage factory. In the late 19th and early 20th centuries, La Motte was serviced by two newspapers, first La Motte News, then the La Motte Tribune.

Two sites in La Motte are listed on the National Register of Historic Places: the Chicago, Milwaukee & St. Paul Narrow Gauge Depot, and the Harris Wagon and Carriage Shop.

== Geography ==
La Motte is located in hilly countryside west of Bellevue. Farmers Creek passes through the city.

According to the United States Census Bureau, the city has a total area of 0.46 square miles (1.19 km^{2}), all land.

== Demographics ==
Historical populations
Year	Pop.	±%
1880	161	—
1890	154	−4.3%
1900	272	+76.6%
1910	288	+5.9%
1920	327	+13.5%
1930	275	−15.9%
1940	272	−1.1%
1950	280	+2.9%
1960	323	+15.4%
1970	326	+0.9%
1980	322	−1.2%
1990	260	−19.3%
2000	272	+4.6%
2010	260	−4.4%
2020	237	−8.8%
Source:"U.S. Census website". United States Census Bureau. and Iowa Data Center; Source: U.S. Decennial Census

=== 2020 census ===
As of the census of 2020, there were 237 people, 101 households, and 69 families residing in the city. The population density was 522.6 inhabitants per square mile (201.8/km^{2}). There were 106 housing units at an average density of 233.8 per square mile (90.3/km^{2}). The racial makeup of the city was 97.9% White, 0.0% Black or African American, 0.0% Native American, 0.0% Asian, 0.0% Pacific Islander, 0.0% from other races and 2.1% from two or more races. Hispanic or Latino persons of any race comprised 0.0% of the population.

Of the 101 households, 26.7% of which had children under the age of 18 living with them, 59.4% were married couples living together, 10.9% were cohabitating couples, 13.9% had a female householder with no spouse or partner present and 15.8% had a male householder with no spouse or partner present. 31.7% of all households were non-families. 22.8% of all households were made up of individuals, 4.0% had someone living alone who was 65 years old or older.

The median age in the city was 42.3 years. 24.5% of the residents were under the age of 20; 4.2% were between the ages of 20 and 24; 25.3% were from 25 and 44; 26.6% were from 45 and 64; and 19.4% were 65 years of age or older. The gender makeup of the city was 49.8% male and 50.2% female.

=== 2010 census ===
As of the census of 2010, there were 260 people, 106 households, and 80 families living in the city. The population density was 565.2 inhabitants per square mile (218.2/km^{2}). There were 109 housing units at an average density of 237.0 per square mile (91.5/km^{2}). The racial makeup of the city was 96.2% White and 3.8% from two or more races.

There were 106 households, of which 32.1% had children under the age of 18 living with them, 66.0% were married couples living together, 4.7% had a female householder with no husband present, 4.7% had a male householder with no wife present, and 24.5% were non-families. 20.8% of all households were made up of individuals, and 7.5% had someone living alone who was 65 years of age or older. The average household size was 2.45 and the average family size was 2.84.

The median age in the city was 40 years. 24.6% of residents were under the age of 18; 4.3% were between the ages of 18 and 24; 28.9% were from 25 to 44; 27.3% were from 45 to 64; and 15% were 65 years of age or older. The gender makeup of the city was 51.5% male and 48.5% female.

=== 2000 census ===
As of the census of 2000, there were 272 people, 105 households, and 80 families living in the city. The population density was 582.6 inhabitants per square mile (224.9/km^{2}). There were 105 housing units at an average density of 224.9 per square mile (86.8/km^{2}). The racial makeup of the city was 99.26% White, and 0.74% from two or more races.

There were 105 households, out of which 30.5% had children under the age of 18 living with them, 66.7% were married couples living together, 6.7% had a female householder with no husband present, and 23.8% were non-families. 17.1% of all households were made up of individuals, and 7.6% had someone living alone who was 65 years of age or older. The average household size was 2.59 and the average family size was 2.98.

In the city, the population was spread out, with 23.5% under the age of 18, 8.5% from 18 to 24, 29.4% from 25 to 44, 23.2% from 45 to 64, and 15.4% who were 65 years of age or older. The median age was 38 years. For every 100 females, there were 98.5 males. For every 100 females age 18 and over, there were 103.9 males.

The median income for a household in the city was $35,625, and the median income for a family was $38,125. Males had a median income of $33,750 versus $25,694 for females. The per capita income for the city was $19,794. About 4.7% of families and 9.0% of the population were below the poverty line, including 15.1% of those under the age of eighteen and 5.9% of those 65 or over.

== Education ==
Bellevue Community School District operates local area schools.

== Notable person ==
- N. B. Nemmers, state legislator and mayor of La Motte
