= Louis Winslow Austin =

American physicist

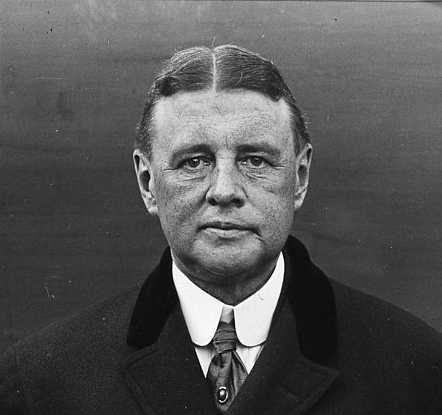
- Louis Winslow Austin c. 1918
- Born: October 30, 1867; Orwell, Vermont
- Died: June 27, 1932 (aged 64); Washington, D.C.
- Citizenship: United States
- Education: University of Strasbourg
- Known for: Radio propagation and technology
- Awards: IEEE Medal of Honor (1927)
- Scientific career
- Fields: Electrical engineering
- Workplaces: University of Wisconsin–Madison

Louis Winslow Austin (October 30, 1867 – June 27, 1932) was an American physicist known for his research on long-range radio transmissions.

Austin was born in Orwell, Vermont, and educated at Middlebury College (class of 1889) and the University of Strasbourg (then in Germany), from which he received a Ph.D. in 1893. From 1893 to 1901, he taught physics as an instructor and assistant professor at the University of Wisconsin–Madison, then returned to Germany for two years at the Physikalisch-Technische Reichsanstalt in Berlin, where he performed research on hot gases.

In 1904 Austin joined the National Bureau of Standards to study radio propagation. After the United States Navy established its Naval Radio Telegraphic Laboratory (later the Naval Research Laboratory) within the bureau, Austin served as its director from 1908 to 1923, and from 1923 to 1932 as chief of the Radio Physics Laboratory.

Austin's research focused on radio propagation and static, and more specifically the influence of temperature, humidity, magnetic storms, and sunspots on long-range radio transmissions.

Under his direction, the Navy conducted long-distance wireless measurements in 1909 and 1910 between the USS Birmingham and USS Salem, as they steamed south into the Atlantic, and Fessenden's station at Brant Rock, Massachusetts. The Birmingham was eventually 1200 miles from Brant Rock, while the Salem reached a distance of 450 mile. Austin measured received impulses from the ships on the 3,750- and 1,000-meter wavelengths to determine the relationships between transmitting and received currents, antenna heights, wavelength, and distance. These measurements led Austin and collaborator Dr. Louis Cohen to develop the empirical Austin-Cohen formula for predicting radio signal strength at long distances.

Austin joined the Institute for Radio Engineers (now IEEE) in 1913, in 1914 served as its third president, and in 1927 received its Medal of Honor "for his pioneer work in the quantitative measurement and correlation of factors involved in radio wave transmission." He also served as a U.S. representative at numerous international radio conferences. Austin died on June 27, 1932, in Washington, D.C.

== Personal life ==
Louis Winslow Austin was born 30 October 1867 at Orwell, Addison Co., Vermont, US. He was the only child of Lewis Augustine Austin and Mary Louise Austin née Taft. As a child, he lived with his parents at Manchester, Bennington Co., Vermont, US 1868–1872 and Meriden, Sullivan Co., New Hampshire, US 1872–1880. He lived at Middleburg, Vermont from 1880 to 1889. Strassburg, Germany (now France) 1889–1893. Madison, Wisconsin, 1893–1901, where he concluded as assistant professor of physics at the University of Wisconsin. He married Laura Osborne (born 10 August 1875, McGregor, Clayton County, Iowa) on 16 August 1898 at La Crosse, La Crosse County, Wisconsin.

Laura Alma Austin née Osborne was born 10 August 1875 at McGregor, Clayton Co., Iowa. She was the second of three children to Willis Leroy Osborne and Julia Livia Osborne née Colman. She lived with her parents at McGregor, Iowa 1875–1877 and La Crosse, Wisconsin 1877–1898 until her marriage. She was a student at the University of Wisconsin, graduating in the class of 1897 with a degree of Arts Bachelor. She was a member of Kappa Alpha Theta fraternity. Laura remained actively involved with her alma mater throughout her life. She was a life member of the Alumni Association of the University of Wisconsin and served several roles within the organisation. She frequently accompanied her husband in his travels (England, 1912; Panama, 1915; Puerto Rico, 1920; Europe, 1921; Europe, 1922; Japan, 1927). There were no children to the marriage.

== Career ==
Austin commenced his studies at Middlebury College (which was close to his birthplace in Orwell), circa 1887 and graduated as Bachelor of Arts in 1889. He travelled to Strassburg, Germany (now France) to study at the University of Strassburg. From 1890 to 1891, Austin served one year as fellow in physics at Clark University in Massachusetts, then returned to Strassburg to complete his doctoral studies. In 1893, he was awarded a doctorate of philosophy in physical science at the University of Strassburg.

=== University of Wisconsin, Madison, Dane Co., Wisconsin, US: 1893–1897 ===
Austin commenced with the University of Wisconsin (now University of Wisconsin-Madison) as an instructor in physics in 1893, soon after the award of his Ph.D. In 1895 he was promoted to the position of assistant professor of physics. At the time, the president of the university was Charles Kendall Adams and the vice president was John Barber Parkinson. Physics then came within the College of Letters and Science under Dean Edward Asahel Birge. Other faculty members in the field of physics at the time were Benjamin Warner Snow (professor of physics), John Eugene Davies (professor of electricity and magnetism and mathematical physics), Charles Burton Thwing (instructor in physics) and Ervin Sidney Ferry (instructor in physics, taking over the position vacated by Austin in 1895).

Laboratory practice was a significant part of Austin's curriculum and in this he greatly emphasized the need for careful attention to detail to achieve the highest possible accuracy with the instruments available. This approach was heavily influenced by his time in Germany and served him well throughout his later career.

He was a close associate of Thwing, who had also received a Ph.D. in Germany (University of Bonn, under the supervision of Professor Heinrich Hertz). In their approaches to laboratory practice, Thwing and Austin were closely similar. Finding little introductory laboratory material available, together they authored in 1895 a useful book "Exercises in Physical Measurement" for first year laboratory students. It was published the following year and immediately found application both in the classes of the university and more widely. Within its pages one can see evidence of future techniques which would place him at the forefront of the radio pioneering empiricists.

=== Physikalisch-Technische Reichsanstalt, Charlottenburg, Germany: 1901–1902 ===
Returning to Germany in 1901, Austin worked at the renowned Physikalisch-Technische Reichsanstalt (PTR) now Physikalisch-Technische Bundesanstalt (PTB) in Charlottenburg (now a suburb of Berlin). There he studied the properties of gases at high temperatures. Together with colleague Starke, he is credited with the discovery of secondary electron emission in 1902, which they reported in an article in Annalen der Physik. But the discovery had to await almost two decades for commercial applications to develop in the form of the photomultiplier, a key enabler of television technology and today's advances in neutrino detectors. The primary function of the Physikalisch-Technische Reichsanstalt in Germany was to establish national metrological standards including measurement and calibration techniques. In the US that function was charged to the Bureau of Standards and Austin's work at the PTR would have been favorably viewed by his future employer.

=== Later Career ===
Austin resumed his position of assistant professor of physics at the University of Wisconsin in 1902 and continued there until 1904.

In 1904 he commenced employment with the then Bureau of Standards (later renamed National Bureau of Standards, now National Institute of Standards and Technology).

In 1908 the United States Navy established the Naval Radio-Telegraphic Research Laboratory within the Bureau of Standards and Austin was appointed its chief from inception and remained in that post until 1923.

From 1923 until his passing in 1932 he continued his work at the Bureau of Standards in Washington DC.

== Austin-Cohen Formula ==
A mathematical model for propagation of radio frequency electromagnetic waves along the surface of the earth had been a challenge for mathematicians for decades. Throughout this period, as each new model was developed and promoted, it had to withstand the immediate question "how well does it match the Austin-Cohen formula?" This was the lasting testament of a few years circa 1911 of exacting measurements undertaken by Austin and his friend and colleague Louis Cohen. As in so many scientific accomplishments, there were elements of serendipity to the experiments. As is now well known the independent variables are frequency/wavelength, distance, surface conductivity. The latter variable is particularly troublesome varying greatly with the type of the ground (rock, soil, clay or sand), its depth profile, cover and moisture content; almost impossible to measure directly. A further complication is that the type of ground will itself vary over large distances of the order of hundreds of kilometers.

Today effective ground conductivity is mostly calculated from measurement of the actual attenuation of radio waves propagating over that surface. But Austin's then employer was the US Department of Navy and they were principally interested in communications shore to ship and ship to ship. Austin's measurements were almost entirely over sea which has the quantity of both homogeneity and constancy of surface conductivity. By eliminating conductivity from the variable set, Austin's measurements with carefully calibrated but rudimentary instruments of the day, produced a clean set of data of field strength against frequency and distance. The resulting empirical model was simple, elegant and precise. It would provide for decades both his employers with a scientific basis to plan their naval radio communications services as well as mathematicians a yardstick against which to test their surfacewave propagation deterministic models. Had Austin extended his data to include the land of highly variable surface conductivity to the north, west and south of the transmitters available to him, the resultant data would have been almost chaotic for the day and likely necessitated a stochastic model for solution, similar to the problem of night-time skywave propagation to which he devoted much of his time in his remaining two decades.

== Biographies ==
- Obituary - Louis Winslow Austin, 1932, Science, Vol. 76, No. 1963, pp 137
- IEEE History Center biography
- Britannica Online entry
- Orrin E. Dunlap Jr., Radio's One Hundred Men of Science
- "Louis Winslow Austin", Proceedings of the Institute of Radio Engineers, 1932, Vol. 20, Issue 8
- J. E. Brittain, "Electrical Engineering Hall of Fame: Louis W. Austin", Proceedings of the IEEE, 2005, Vol. 93, Issue 12

== Publications ==
=== Miscellaneous ===
- L. W. Austin, "The effect of extreme cold on magnetism", 1894
- L. W. Austin & C. B. Thwing, "Exercises in physical measurement", 1896, Allyn & Bacon
- L. W. Austin, "Experimental-untersuchungen über die elastische Längs- und Torsions-nachwirkung"
- L. W. Austin, and C. W. Eastman, "On the relation between heat conductivity and density in some of the common woods", 1902
- L. Austin & H. Starke, "Ueber die Reflexion der Kathodenstrahlen und eine damit verbundene neue Erscheinung secundaerer Emission", Annalen der Physik, 1902, Vol. 9, P.271
- Kritische Bemerkungen zu der Mitteilung der Herren Austin und Starke über Kathodenstrahlreflexion. Sonderabdruck aus 'Verhandlungen der Deutschen Physikalischen Gesellschaft', Jahrgang 4, Nr. 8). Braunschweig, 1902

=== Physical Review ===
- Louis W. Austin, "An Experimental Research on the Longitudinal and Torsional Elastic Fatigue", Phys. Rev. (Series I), 1894, 1, 401–425
- Louis W. Austin & Charles B. Thwing, "An Experimental Research on Gravitational Permeability", Phys. Rev. (Series I), 1897, 5, 294–300
- Louis W. Austin, "On the Change in Length of Soft Iron in an Alternating Magnetic Field", Phys. Rev. (Series I), 1900, 10, 180–186
- Louis W. Austin, "A Modification of Mance's Method of Determining Battery Resistance", Phys. Rev. (Series I), 1900, 11, 117–117
- Louis W. Austin, "The Application of the Manometric Flame to the Telephone", Phys. Rev. (Series I), 1901, 12, 121–124
- L. Holborn & L. W. Austin, "On the Specific Heat of Gases at High Temperatures", Phys. Rev. (Series I), 1905, 21, 209–228
- L. W. Austin, "On an Emission of Negatively Charged Particles Produced by Canal Rays", Physical Review (Series I), 1906, 22, 5, 312
- L. W. Austin, "The Electrolytic Wave Detector", Phys. Rev. (Series I), 1906, 22, 364–365
- L. W. Austin, "The High Resistance Contact Thermo-electric Detector for Electrical Waves", Phys. Rev. (Series I), 1907, 24, 508–510

=== Bureau of Standards ===
- L. W. Austin, "Detector for very small alternating currents and electrical waves", Bulletin of the Bureau of Standards, 1905, Vol. 1, Issue 3
- L. W. Austin, "Positive charges carried by the canal rays", Bulletin of the Bureau of Standards, 1905, Vol. 1, Issue 3
- L. W. Austin, "On the platinum point electrolytic detector for electrical waves", Bulletin of the Bureau of Standards, 1906, Vol. 2, Issue 2
- K. E. Guthe & L. W. Austin, "Experiments on the Heusler magnetic alloys", Bulletin of the Bureau of Standards, 1906, Vol. 2, Issue 2
- L. W. Austin, "The production of high frequency oscillations from the electric arc", Bulletin of the Bureau of Standards, 1907, Vol. 3, Issue 2
- L. W. Austin, "Some contact rectifiers of electric currents", Bulletin of the Bureau of Standards, 1908, Vol. 5, Issue 1
- L. W. Austin, "A method for producing feebly damped high frequency electrical oscillations for laboratory measurements", Bulletin of the Bureau of Standards, 1908, Vol. 5, Issue 1
- L. W. Austin, "On the advantages of a high spark frequency in radio-telegraphy", Bulletin of the Bureau of Standards, 1908, Vol. 5, Issue 1 (Broken link, reported to publisher 24 Dec 2012, will be fixed)
- L. W. Austin, "The comparative sensitiveness of some common detectors of electric oscillations", Bulletin of the Bureau of Standards, 1910, Vol. 6, Issue 4
- L. W. Austin, "The measurement of electrical oscillations in the receiving antenna", Bulletin of the Bureau of Standards, 1911, Vol. 7, Issue 2
- L. W. Austin, "Some experiments with coupled high frequency circuits", Bulletin of the Bureau of Standards, 1911, Vol. 7, Issue 2
- L. W. Austin, "Some quantitative experiments in long distance radiotelegraphy", Bulletin of the Bureau of Standards, 1911, Vol. 7, Issue 3
- L. W. Austin, "Antenna resistance", Bulletin of the Bureau of Standards, 1913, Vol. 9, Issue 1
- L. W. Austin, "Energy losses in some condensers used in high-frequency circuits", Bulletin of the Bureau of Standards, 1913, Vol. 9, Issue 1
- L. W. Austin, "Quantitative experiments in radiotelegraphic transmission", Bulletin of the Bureau of Standards, 1914, Vol. 11, Issue 1
- L. W. Austin, "Note on the resistance of radiotelegraphic antennas", Bulletin of the Bureau of Standards, 1916, Vol. 12, Issue 3

=== Institute of Radio Engineers ===
- L. W. Austin, "The relation between effective resistance and frequency in radio telegraphic condensers", Proceedings of the Institute of Radio Engineers, 1913, Vol. 1, Issue 2
- L. W. Austin, "The effect of a parallel condenser in the receiving antenna", Proceedings of the Institute of Radio Engineers, 1914, Vol. 2, Issue 2
- L. W. Austin, "Seasonal Variation in the Strength of Radiotelegraphic Signals", Proceedings of the Institute of Radio Engineers, 1915, Vol. 3, Issue 2
- L. W. Austin, "Experiments at the U. S. Naval Radio Station Darien, Canal Zone", Proceedings of the Institute of Radio Engineers, 1916, Vol. 4, Issue 3
- L. W. Austin, "The Measurement of Radiotelegraphic Signals with the Oscillating Audion", Proceedings of the Institute of Radio Engineers, 1917, Vol. 5, Issue 4
- L. W. Austin, "Note on: The Measurement of Radiotelegraphic Signals with the Oscillating Audion", Proceedings of the Institute of Radio Engineers, 1917, Vol. 5, Issue 5
- L. W. Austin, "Resonance Measurements in Radiotelegraphy with the Oscillating Audion", Proceedings of the Institute of Radio Engineers, 1919, Vol. 7, Issue 1
- L. W. Austin, "A New Method of Using Contact Detectors in Radio Measurements", Proceedings of the Institute of Radio Engineers, 1919, Vol. 7, Issue 3
- L. W. Austin, "Calculation of Antenna Capacity", Proceedings of the Institute of Radio Engineers, 1920, Vol. 8, Issue 2
- L. W. Austin, "Discussion of: Measurement of the electromagnetic field of waves received during trans-oceanic radio transmission", Proceedings of the Institute of Radio Engineers, 1920, Vol. 8, Issue 4
- L. W. Austin, "Quantitative Experiments with Coil Antennas in Radio Telegraphy", Proceedings of the Institute of Radio Engineers, 1920, Vol. 8, Issue 5
- L. W. Austin, "The Relation between Atmospheric Disturbances and Wave Length in Radio Reception", Proceedings of the Institute of Radio Engineers, 1921, Vol. 9, Issue 1
- L. W. Austin, "The Reduction of Atmospheric Disturbances in Radio Reception", Proceedings of the Institute of Radio Engineers, 1921, Vol. 9, Issue 1
- L. W. Austin, "Receiving Measurements and Atmospheric Disturbances at the Naval Radio Research Laboratory, Bureau of Standards, Washington, March and April, 1922", Proceedings of the Institute of Radio Engineers, 1922, Vol. 10, Issue 4
- L. W. Austin, "Receiving Measurements and Atmospheric Disturbances at the United States Naval Radio Research Laboratory, Bureau of Standards, Washington, May and June, 1922", Proceedings of the Institute of Radio Engineers, 1922, Vol. 10, Issue 5
- L. W. Austin, "The Monthly Averages of Signal Strength of Nauen in Washington, 1915–1921 and the Monthly Averages of Atmospheric Disturbances in Washington, 1918–1921", Proceedings of the Institute of Radio Engineers, 1922, Vol. 10, Issue 3
- L. W. Austin, "Receiving Measurements and Atmospheric Disturbances at the Naval Radio Research Laboratory, Bureau of Standards, Washington, July and August, 1922", Proceedings of the Institute of Radio Engineers, 1922, Vol. 10, Issue 6
- L. W. Austin, "Reception Measurements at Naval Radio Research Laboratory, Washington", Proceedings of the Institute of Radio Engineers, 1922, Vol. 10, Issue 3
- L. W. Austin, "Receiving Measurements and Atmospheric Disturbances at the United States Naval Radio Research Laboratory, Bureau of Standards, Washington, January and February, 1923", Proceedings of the Institute of Radio Engineers, 1923, Vol. 11, Issue 3
- L. W. Austin, "Observations on Lafayette and Nauen Stations in Washington, March 1, 1922, to February 28, 1923", Proceedings of the Institute of Radio Engineers, 1923, Vol. 11, Issue 5
- L. W. Austin, "Receiving Measurements and Atmospheric Disturbances at the United States Naval Radio Research Laboratory, Bureau of Standards, Washington, November and December, 1922", Proceedings of the Institute of Radio Engineers, 1923, Vol. 11, Issue 2
- L. W. Austin, "Loop Uni-Directional Receiving Circuits for the Determination of the Direction of Atmospheric Disturbances", Proceedings of the Institute of Radio Engineers, 1923, Vol. 11, Issue 4
- L. W. Austin, "Receiving Measurements and Atmospheric Disturbances at the United States Naval Radio Research Laboratory, Bureau of Standards, Washington, September and October, 1922", Proceedings of the Institute of Radio Engineers, 1923, Vol. 11, Issue 1
- L. W. Austin, "Receiving Measurements and Atmospheric Disturbances at the Bureau of Standards, Washington, D.C., May and June, 1923", Proceedings of the Institute of Radio Engineers, 1923, Vol. 11, Issue 6
- L. W. Austin, "Receiving Measurements and Atmospheric Disturbances at the United States Naval Radio Research Laboratory, Bureau of Standards, Washington, March and April, 1923", Proceedings of the Institute of Radio Engineers, 1923, Vol. 11, Issue 4
- L. W. Austin & E. B. Judson, "A Method of Measuring Radio Field Intensities and Atmospheric Disturbances", Proceedings of the Institute of Radio Engineers, 1924, Vol. 12, Issue 5
- L. W. Austin, "Field Intensity Measurements in Washington on the Radio Corporation Stations at New Brunswick and Tuckerton, New Jersey", Proceedings of the Institute of Radio Engineers, 1924, Vol. 12, Issue 6
- L. W. Austin, "Receiving Measurements and Atmospheric Disturbances at the Bureau of Standards, Washington, September and October, 1923", Proceedings of the Institute of Radio Engineers, 1924, Vol. 12, Issue 2
- L. W. Austin, "Receiving Measurements and Atmospheric Disturbances at the Radio Physical Laboratory, Bureau of Standards, Washington, July and August, 1923", Proceedings of the Institute of Radio Engineers, 1924, Vol. 12, Issue 1
- L. W. Austin, "Receiving Measurements and Atmospheric Disturbances at the Bureau of Standards, Washington, November and December, 1923", Proceedings of the Institute of Radio Engineers, 1924, Vol. 12, Issue 3
- L. W. Austin, "Long Distance Radio Receiving Measurements at the Bureau of Standards in 1923", Proceedings of the Institute of Radio Engineers, 1924, Vol. 12, Issue 4
- L. W. Austin, "Some Trans-Pacific Radio Field Intensity Measurements", Proceedings of the Institute of Radio Engineers, 1925, Vol. 13, Issue 2
- L. W. Austin, "A Suggestion for Experiments on Apparent Radio Direction Variations", Proceedings of the Institute of Radio Engineers, 1925, Vol. 13, Issue 1
- L. W. Austin, "International Union for Scientific Radio Telegraphy U.R.S.I. Long Distance Radio Receiving Measurements in 1924", Proceedings of the Institute of Radio Engineers, 1925, Vol. 13, Issue 3
- L. W. Austin, "A New Phenomenon in Sunset Radio Direction Variations", Proceedings of the Institute of Radio Engineers, 1925, Vol. 13, Issue 4
- L. W. Austin, R. L. Smith-Rose & R. H. Barfield, "Discussion on: A New Phenomenon in Sunset Radio Direction Variations", Proceedings of the Institute of Radio Engineers, 1925, Vol. 13, Issue 6
- L. W. Austin, "Direction Determinations of Atmospheric Disturbances on the Isthmus of Panama", Proceedings of the Institute of Radio Engineers, 1926, Vol. 14, Issue 3
- L. W. Austin, "The Present Status of Radio Atmospheric Disturbances", Proceedings of the Institute of Radio Engineers, 1926, Vol. 14, Issue 1
- L. W. Austin, "Preliminary Note on Proposed Changes in the Constants of the Austin-Cohen Transmission Formula", Proceedings of the Institute of Radio Engineers, 1926, Vol. 14, Issue 3
- L. W. Austin, "Long Distance Radio Receiving Measurements and Atmospheric Disturbances at the Bureau of Standards in 1925", Proceedings of the Institute of Radio Engineers, 1926, Vol. 14, Issue 5
- L. W. Austin & I. J. Wymore, "Radio Signal Strength and Temperature", Proceedings of the Institute of Radio Engineers, 1926, Vol. 14, Issue 6
- L. W. Austin, "Discussion on: Long Distance Receiving Measurements at the Bureau of Standards in 1925", Proceedings of the Institute of Radio Engineers, 1927, Vol. 15, Issue 6
- L. W. Austin, "Discussion on: Long Distance Radio Receiving Measurements at the Bureau of Standards in 1925", Proceedings of the Institute of Radio Engineers, 1927, Vol. 15, Issue 2
- L. W. Austin, "Radio Atmospheric Disturbances and Solar Activity", Proceedings of the Institute of Radio Engineers, 1927, Vol. 15, Issue 10
- L. W. Austin, "Long-Wave Radio Measurements at the Bureau of Standards in 1926, with Some Comparisons of Solar Activity and Radio Phenomena", Proceedings of the Institute of Radio Engineers, 1927, Vol. 15, Issue 10
- L. W. Austin, "Discussion on Long Distance Receiving Measurements at the Bureau of Standards in 1925", Proceedings of the Institute of Radio Engineers, 1927, Vol. 15, Issue 12
- L. W. Austin, "Discussion on Long Distance Radio Receiving Measurements at the Bureau of Standards in 1925", Proceedings of the Institute of Radio Engineers, 1928, Vol. 16, Issue 3
- L. W. Austin, "Long-Wave Radio Receiving Measurements at the Bureau of Standards in 1927", Proceedings of the Institute of Radio Engineers, 1928, Vol. 16, Issue 9
- L. W. Austin, "Report of the Chairman of the Commission on Radio Wave Propagation, International Union of Scientific Radio Telegraphy", Proceedings of the Institute of Radio Engineers, 1928, Vol. 16, Issue 3
- L. W. Austin & I. J. Wymore, "On the Influence of Solar Activity on Radio Transmission", Proceedings of the Institute of Radio Engineers, 1928, Vol. 16, Issue 2
- L. W. Austin, "Experiments in Recording Radio Signal Intensity", Proceedings of the Institute of Radio Engineers, 1929, Vol. 17, Issue 7
- L. W. Austin, "Long-Wave Radio Receiving Measurements at the Bureau of Standards in 1928", Proceedings of the Institute of Radio Engineers, 1930, Vol. 18, Issue 1
- L. W. Austin, "Long Wave Radio Receiving Measurements at the Bureau of Standards in 1929", Proceedings of the Institute of Radio Engineers, 1930, Vol. 18, Issue 9
- L. W. Austin, E. B. Judson & I. J. Wymore-Shiel "Solar and Magnetic Activity and Radio Transmission", Proceedings of the Institute of Radio Engineers, 1930, Vol. 18, Issue 12
- L. W. Austin, "Long-Wave Radio Receiving Measurements at the Bureau of Standards in 1930", Proceedings of the Institute of Radio Engineers, 1931, Vol. 19, Issue 10
- L. W. Austin, "A Method of Representing Radio Wave Propagation Conditions", Proceedings of the Institute of Radio Engineers, 1931, Vol. 19, Issue 9
- L. W. Austin, "Tables of North Atlantic Radio Transmission Conditions for Long-Wave Daylight Signals for the Years 1922–1930", Proceedings of the Institute of Radio Engineers, 1932, Vol. 20, Issue 4
- L. W. Austin, "Solar Activity and Radiotelegraphy", Proceedings of the Institute of Radio Engineers, 1932, Vol. 20, Issue 2
