= Harris Wagon and Carriage Shop =

- U.S. National Register of Historic Places
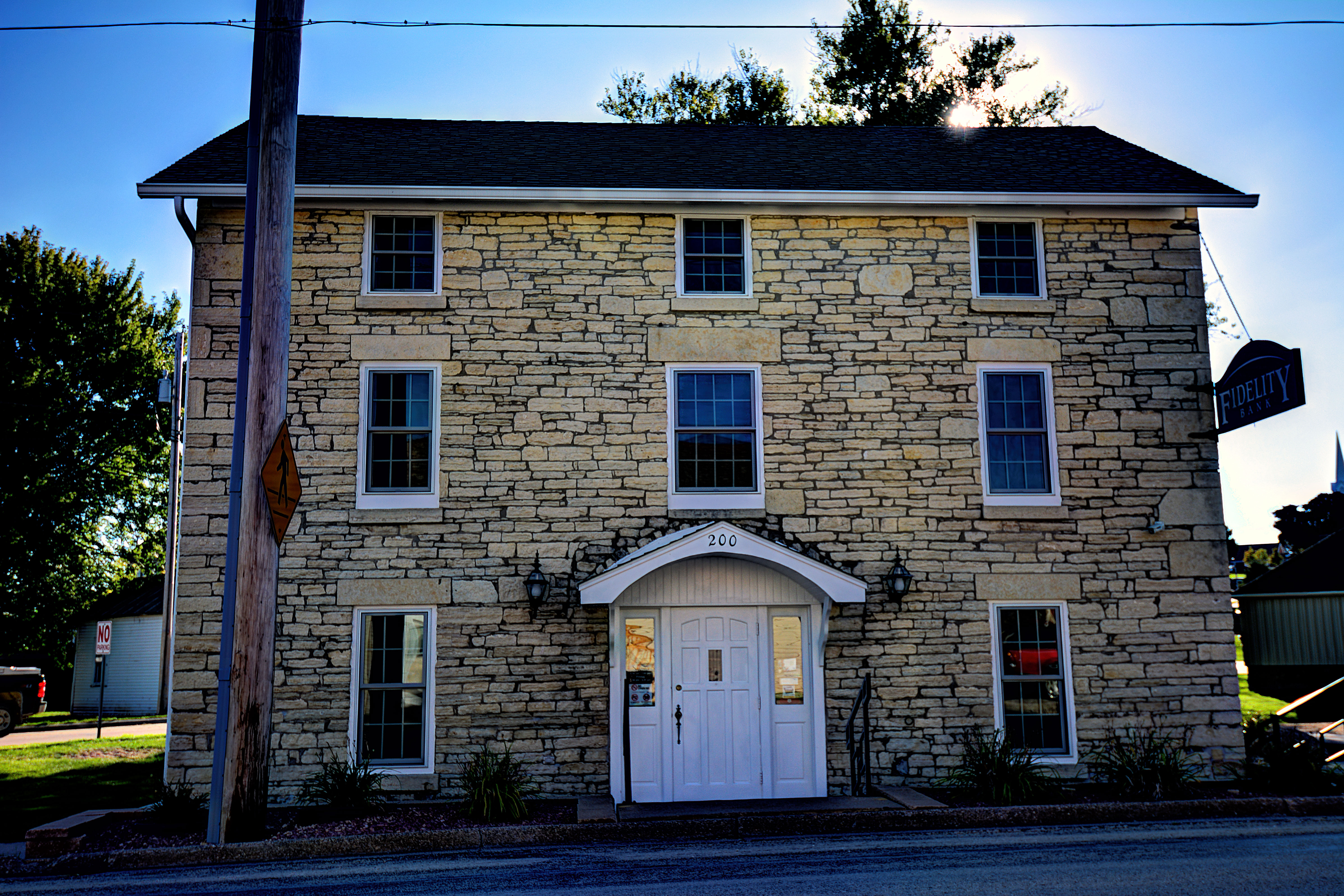

- Location within Iowa Location within the United States
- Location: Junction of Main and Pine Sts., La Motte, Iowa
- Coordinates: 42°17′44″N 90°37′19″W
- Area: less than one acre
- Built: 1871
- Architectural style: Vernacular
- MPS: Limestone Architecture of Jackson County MPS
- NRHP reference No.: 92000917
- Added to NRHP: July 24, 1992

Harris Wagon and Carriage Shop is a historic industrial/commercial building located in La Motte, Iowa, United States. It is one of over 217 limestone structures in Jackson County from the mid-19th century, of which 20 are commercial/industrial buildings. The three-story structure was built in 1871, possibly for Levi Hutchins. It is also possible it was built for the Will and F.R. Harris Wagon & Carriage Shop, which was located here. There was some difficulty identifying the original owner. Over the years the building has also housed a harness shop, a hardware store, and a feed and farm supply store, before becoming a bank in 1982. The stone blocks that were used in the construction of this rectangular structure vary somewhat in shape and size, and they were laid in courses. The window sills and lintels are dressed stone. It features a symmetrical, three bay facade. The building was listed on the National Register of Historic Places in 1992.
