= Joseph Salzmann =

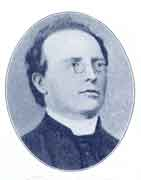
Josef Salzmann, Austrian-American priest and missionary.

Joseph Salzmann (August 17, 1819 – January 17, 1874), one of the best-known Roman Catholic pioneer priests in the Northwest Territory of the United States, was the Austrian founder of several Catholic educational institutions, including the prominent Saint Francis de Sales Seminary (St. Francis, Wisconsin) known as the "Salesianum."

== Biography ==
He was born at Münzbach in the Diocese of Linz, Upper Austria on August 17, 1819. He was ordained in 1842 and worked in his home diocese until 1847, when an appeal from the visiting first Bishop of Milwaukee, John Martin Henni inspired him to work in foreign missions.

After arriving in Milwaukee in October, 1847, he was appointed to a small country mission, but soon his success caused the bishop to make him pastor of St. Mary's congregation at Milwaukee. There, he was opposed by German free-thinkers and he struggled with them. Because there was a lack of priests, Salzmann conceived the idea of founding a seminary. To collect funds he went from state to state, and, after many difficulties, on January 29, 1856, the institution was opened with twenty-five students. Michael Heiss, afterwards Archbishop of Milwaukee, was its first rector. The seminary became one of the most prominent in the United States. Several hundred priests and twenty-three bishops graduated from it by 1900.

Salzmann was also the founder of the first Catholic normal school in the United States and of the Pio Nono College. After years of struggles, the Catholic Normal School of the Holy Family found a solid basis, sending out teachers to parochial schools every year.

The American branch of the St. Cecilia Society for the promotion of genuine church music owes its existence and growth to him.

Salzmann died at St. Francis, Wisconsin on January 17, 1874. He was praised as having a noble character full of holy enthusiasm for the cause of God and the Catholic Church, fearless in the defense of truth, an eloquent preacher, a warm friend and father of his students, and a wise counselor to priests and bishops.
