= Pio Nono College (Wisconsin) =

Former school in Wisconsin, United States

Coordinates: 42°58′47″N 87°52′35″W

The Catholic Normal School and Pio Nono College, also known as Holy Family Normal School, was a paired institution (sharing the same faculty) in St. Francis, Wisconsin, founded in 1870 by Rev. Dr. Joseph Salzmann as the first Catholic normal school in the United States. The Normal School specialized in training young men in music education, while Pio Nono was a business college. In 1922, Pio Nono became a high school, serving boys in grades nine to 12. The school merged with Don Bosco High School in 1972 to form Thomas More High School, later renamed St. Thomas More High School.

== Founding ==
As early as 1864, Rev. Salzmann conceived the idea of founding an institution to prepare young men for the teaching profession. He launched the project to build Catholic Normal School and Pio Nono College. On June 12, 1870, the cornerstone for this school was laid. The college was named for Pius IX, who was pope at the time.

The school’s primary focus was music, since the office of an organist and choirmaster was frequently combined with that of teacher. In 1873, Professor Johann Baptist Singenberger arrived from Germany to head the music program. Throughout its early years, Pio Nono was recognized as the chief exponent of Catholic church music in the United States.

== Transition to high school and minor seminary ==
In 1922, the “normal school/college” department was dissolved and Pio Nono became exclusively a Catholic boarding and day high school for boys. Salzmann Hall was built in 1931 to accommodate the growing numbers of students, and this building still stands today as part of St. Thomas More High School.

In 1941, Pio Nono was turned into a minor seminary known as St. Francis Minor Seminary. Serving both day and boarding students, the minor seminary consisted of four years of high school and two years of college. St. Francis Minor Seminary continued to educate young men at Pio Nono's former location until de Sales Preparatory Seminary was dedicated in 1963.

== Resurrection and merger with Don Bosco ==
Under the leadership of Rev. Edmund Olley, Pio Nono reopened in 1965 in the building previously occupied by St. Francis Minor Seminary, and plans for a new building addition were created. The “resurrection” of Pio Nono began with a freshman class of 100, and a new class was added each year, with the first senior class graduating in 1969.

This revival was short-lived, however. Because of declining enrollment in Catholic high schools on Milwaukee's south side, in 1972, Pio Nono merged with Don Bosco High School to form Thomas More All Boys High School. This new school continued to educate young men in the buildings previously occupied by Pio Nono. Later in 2007 with request from the Archbishop "St" was added on making it St Thomas More Highschool.

== School for the deaf ==
St. John's School for the Deaf was founded as part of Pio Nono in 1876 as the Catholic Deaf and Dumb Asylum. In its first year, the 17 students classes were held in the second floor of the Pio Nono gymnasium. A separate building for the school was completed in the summer of 1879 and dedicated in December of that year. From 1889-1895 it operated as the coeducational St. John's Institute for Deaf Mutes. In 1895, the institute became a fully independent school, and was no longer an entity within Pio Nono College.

== Notable alumni ==
- Ray Berres, Major League Baseball catcher
- Rudolph Gerken, bishop and archbishop
- J. Henry Goeke, Congressman from Ohio
- Daniel D. Hanna, restaurateur and Wisconsin legislator
- Jim Jodat, National Football League running back
- N. B. Nemmers, Iowa merchant and politician
- Edward Steichen, photographer
