= David Owen Montague =

American settler (1805–1883)

- Born: 1805; Orwell, Vermont
- Died: September 4, 1883; Davenport, Iowa
- Era: Westward expansion
- Known for: Founding La Motte, Iowa
- Spouse: Lucy Hill
- Children: 6

David Owen Montague (1805–1883) was an American settler. He is one of the main founders of La Motte, Iowa.

== Early life ==
Montague was born to French parents in Orwell, Vermont. He married Lucy Hill in 1829.

== Settler career ==
In 1838, Montague traveled from New York to Jackson County, Iowa, before returning to New York in December. Montague returned to Jackson County in 1843 and settled what would become La Motte. In 1846, Montague, along with John Elliot Goodenow, had a rail station established in the settlement that connected La Motte to Dubuque and Davenport. In 1847, Montague purchased the land from the government at $1.25 an acre. Montague also served as the first postmaster of La Motte.

== Later life and death ==
Ten years before Montague's death, he would move in with his son, A.J. Montague. In January 1883, Montague would enter illness including chronic inflammation of the bowels. He died on September 4, 1883, and was buried in Davenport. In Montague's will, he left the center of La Motte to be used for recreational purposes and for the creation of a public school.
