= Farmers Creek (Iowa) =

River in Jackson County, Iowa, United States

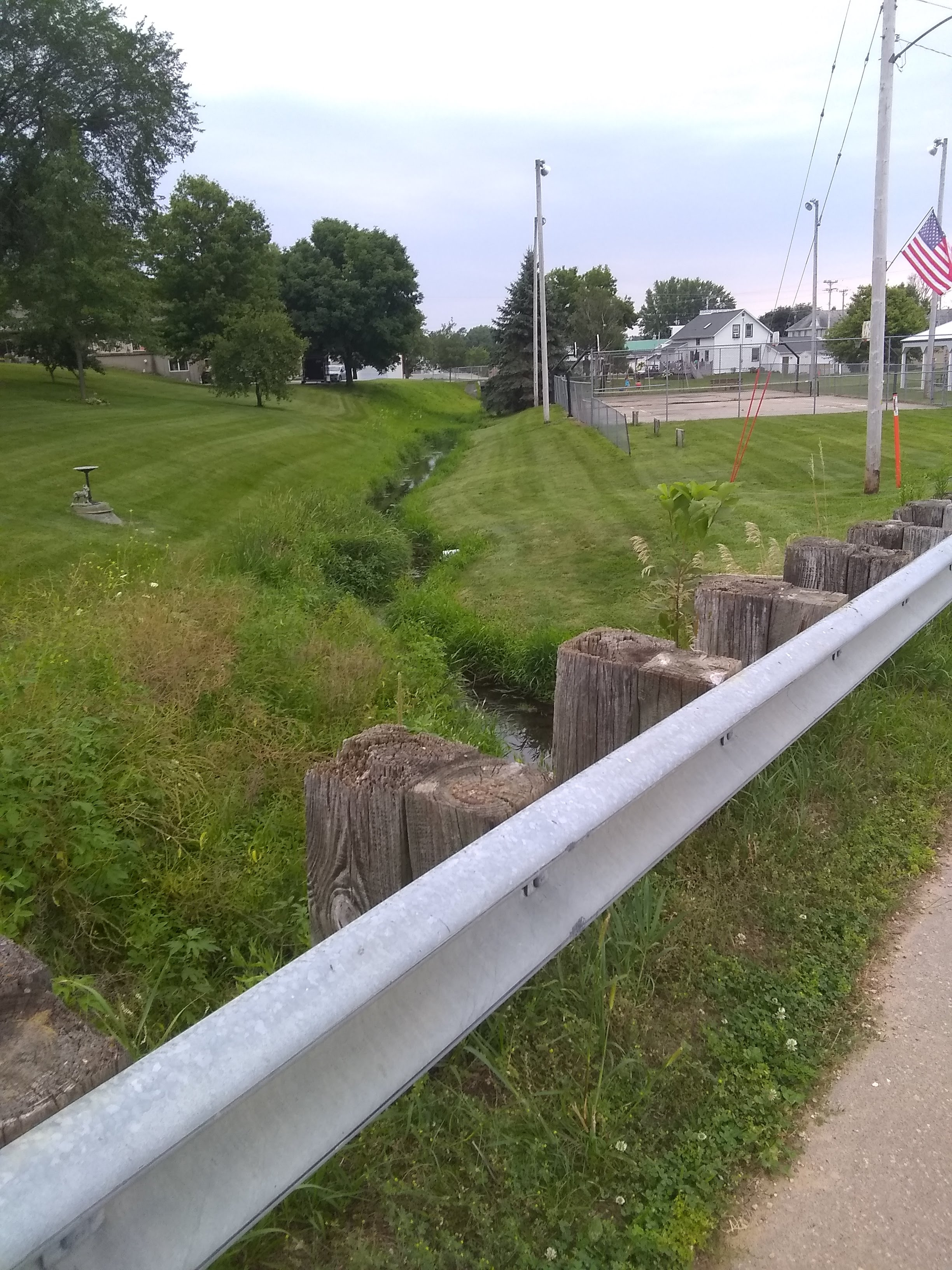
- Farmers Creek in La Motte, Iowa

Location
- Country: United States
- State: Iowa
- County: Jackson County

Physical characteristics
- Mouth: North Fork Maquoketa River
  - coordinates: 42°09′01″N 90°40′04″W
- Length: 18.09 miles (29.11 km)
- Basin size: 47.8 square miles (124 km^{2})

Basin features
- Progression: North Fork Maquoketa→ Maquoketa→ Mississippi→ Gulf of Mexico
- Cities: La Motte, Iowa

Farmers Creek is a stream in Jackson County, Iowa, a tributary of the North Fork Maquoketa River. The creek passes through the city of La Motte.

== Hydrology ==
Farmers Creek is 18.09 miles (29.11 km) long, and its watershed is 47.8 square miles (124 km^{2}) in area. The creek has a steep topography, increasing erosion along the stream. It is a part of the Maquoketa River Watershed.

== History ==
Farmers Creek suffered from fish kills in 1997 and 1998. The 1997 event killed 133,000 fish while the 1998 event killed 4,264. The creek was placed onto Iowa's list of Impaired Waters in 2002. In 2005, the Jackson County Soil and Water Conservation District launched a five-year watershed project. With cooperation from farmers and landowners, protective measures for the stream were installed.

In 2008, the Environmental Protection Agency designated it for A1 primary contact recreation use and BWW2 warmwater aquatic life.

Farmers Creek was delisted from the list of Impaired Waters in 2022 through the improvement of its biological integrity.
