= Catfish Creek (Iowa) =

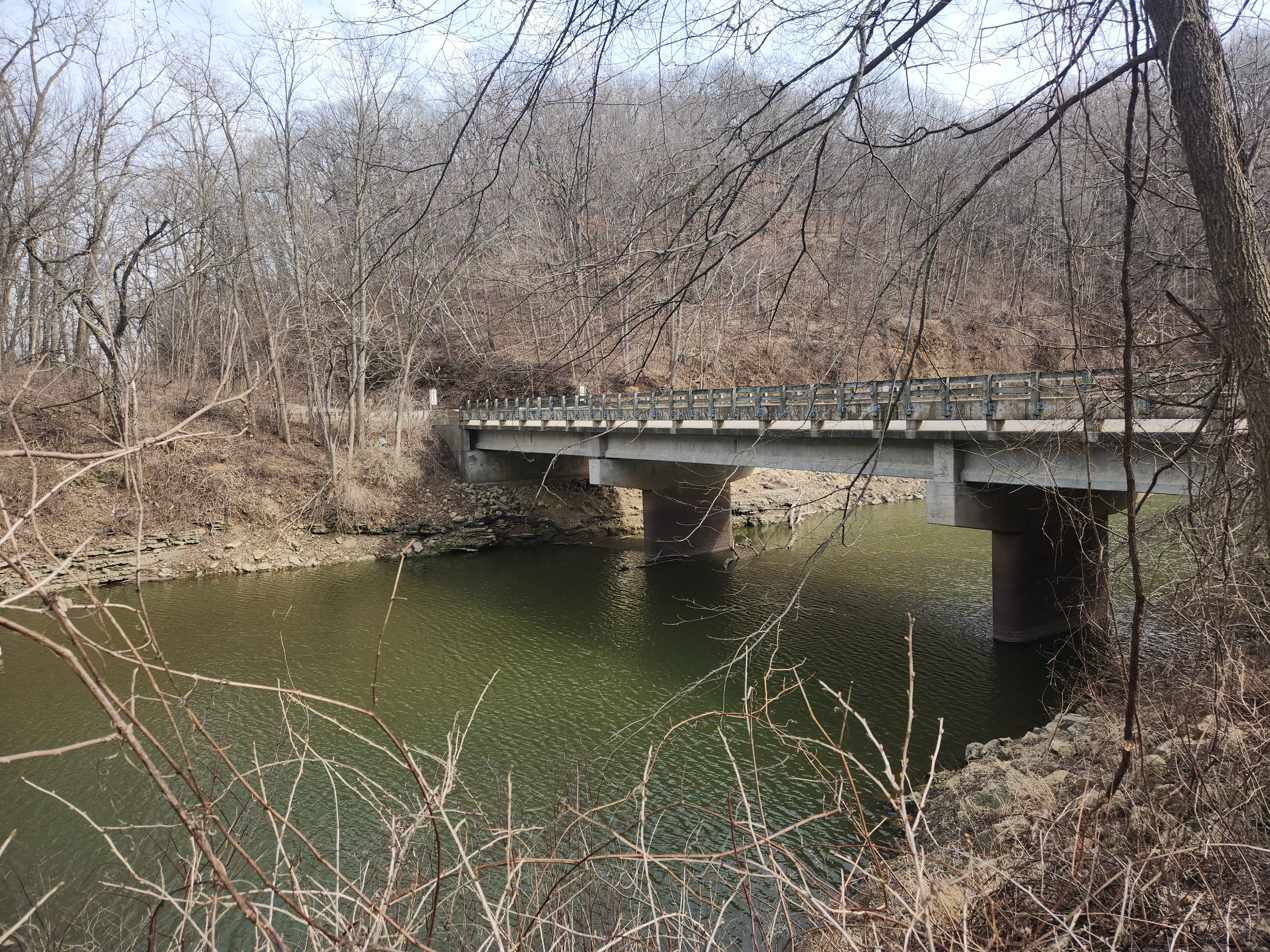
- The Catfish Creek near the Mines of Spain

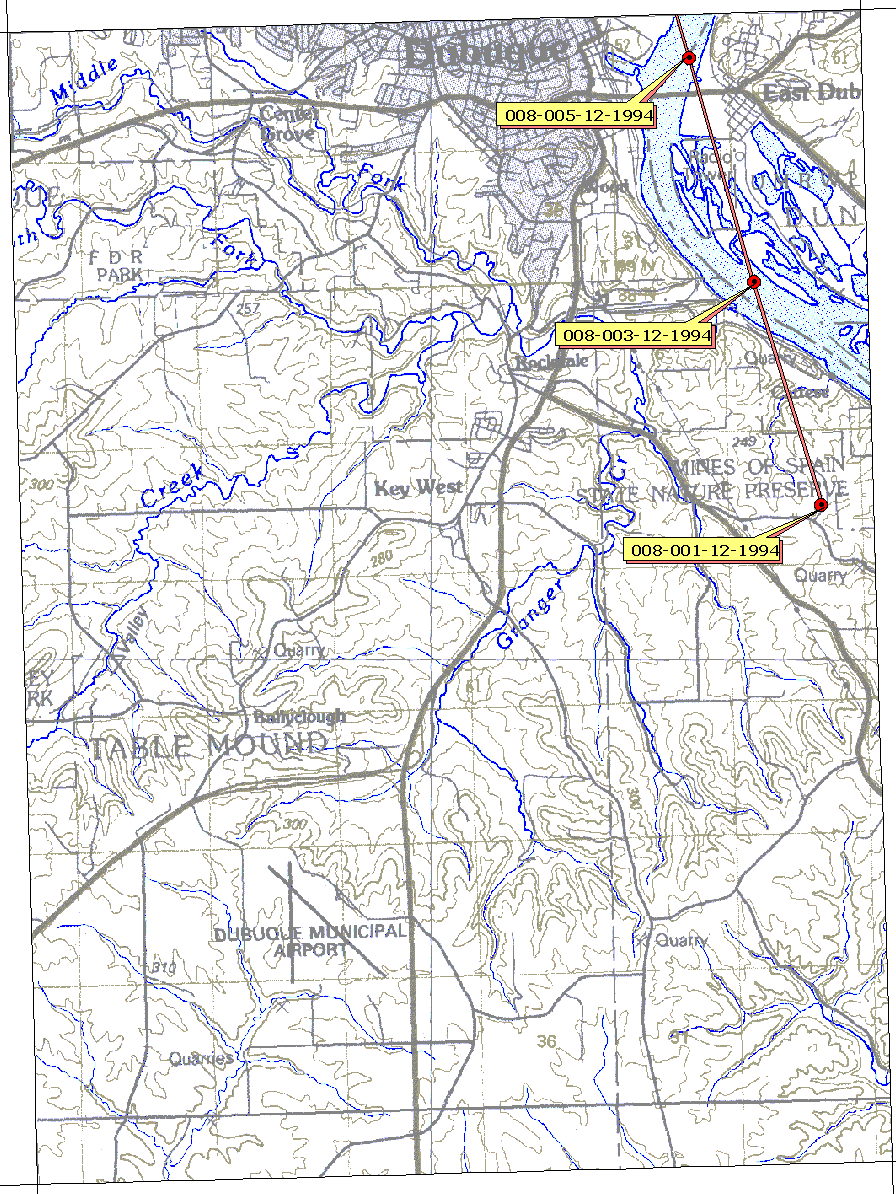
- USGS map of the Catfish Creek and its tributaries.

Location
- Country: US
- State: Iowa
- District: Dubuque County, Iowa

Physical characteristics
- Source
  - coordinates: 42°25′52″N 90°48′37″W
- Mouth: Mississippi River
  - coordinates: 42°28′05″N 90°38′41″W
  - elevation: 600 ft (180 m)
- GNIS feature ID = 455212

Catfish Creek is a 21.2-mile-long (34.1 km) tributary of the Upper Mississippi River in Dubuque County, Iowa. The governments within the watershed have a say in the managing body of the creek through the Catfish Creek Watershed Management Authority. The authority's goal is to promote education on managing the system and fixing issues like the environment.

== Geography ==
It rises southwest of Dubuque, just southeast of Peosta. The Middle Fork rises west of Dubuque and flows under and then parallel to U.S. Route 20; the former Illinois Central Railroad, now the Chicago Central and Pacific Railroad, has its mainline in it. Swiss Valley Park, maintained by Dubuque County, is along the main fork of the creek, which is a designated trout stream through the park.

The Catfish Creek's drainage basin covers about 9,300 acres of land. Within it are parts of Dubuque, Centralia, Peosta, and Asbury.

== History ==
The last American Indians to live in the area were the Meskwaki. In the 1700s, they settled at the mouth of the creek and traded fur with the French. After Julien Dubuque's death, the Meskwaki briefly retook the land but later had to give it up due to the Black Hawk Treaty. Extreme timbering and other exploitations of the lands ensued shortly afterwards. In 1991, a preserve north of the Mines of Spain was declared.

Erosion and eutrophication are issues for the South Fork. Trails have also been proposed for the Catfish Creek.

== See also ==
- List of rivers of Iowa
