= N. B. Nemmers =

American politician (1852–1923)

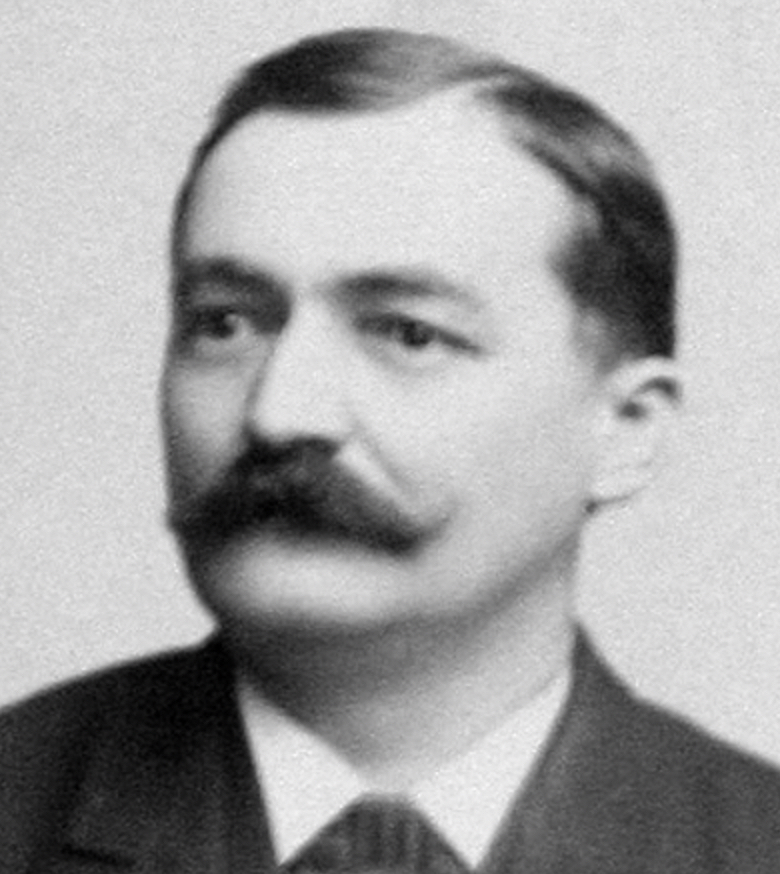

Member of the Iowa House of Representatives

Personal details
- Born: March 15, 1852 St. Donatus, Iowa, US
- Died: February 3, 1923 (aged 70)
- Party: Democratic
- Occupation: Teacher, merchant, politician

Nicholas B. Nemmers (March 15, 1852 – February 3, 1923) was a teacher, merchant, public official and legislator from La Motte, Iowa.

== Early life ==
Nemmers was born in St. Donatus, on March 15, 1852. He attended the local public schools, and attended Pio Nono College, a Catholic men's normal school outside Milwaukee, graduating in 1874. He taught school in Jackson County until 1882, when he became a merchant in La Motte, which remained his primary occupation until his death. On July 5, 1876, he married Elizabeth Manders of St. Donatus; they would have eleven children together.

Nemmers served many years as postmaster of La Motte and also held the office of mayor, councilman, school director, tax assessor, etc. In 1889, he was elected as a Democratic member of the Iowa House of Representatives; he was re-elected in 1891.

He died February 3, 1923, aged 70.
