= First Congregational Church (Orwell, Vermont) =

Historic church in Vermont, United States

- U.S. National Register of Historic Places
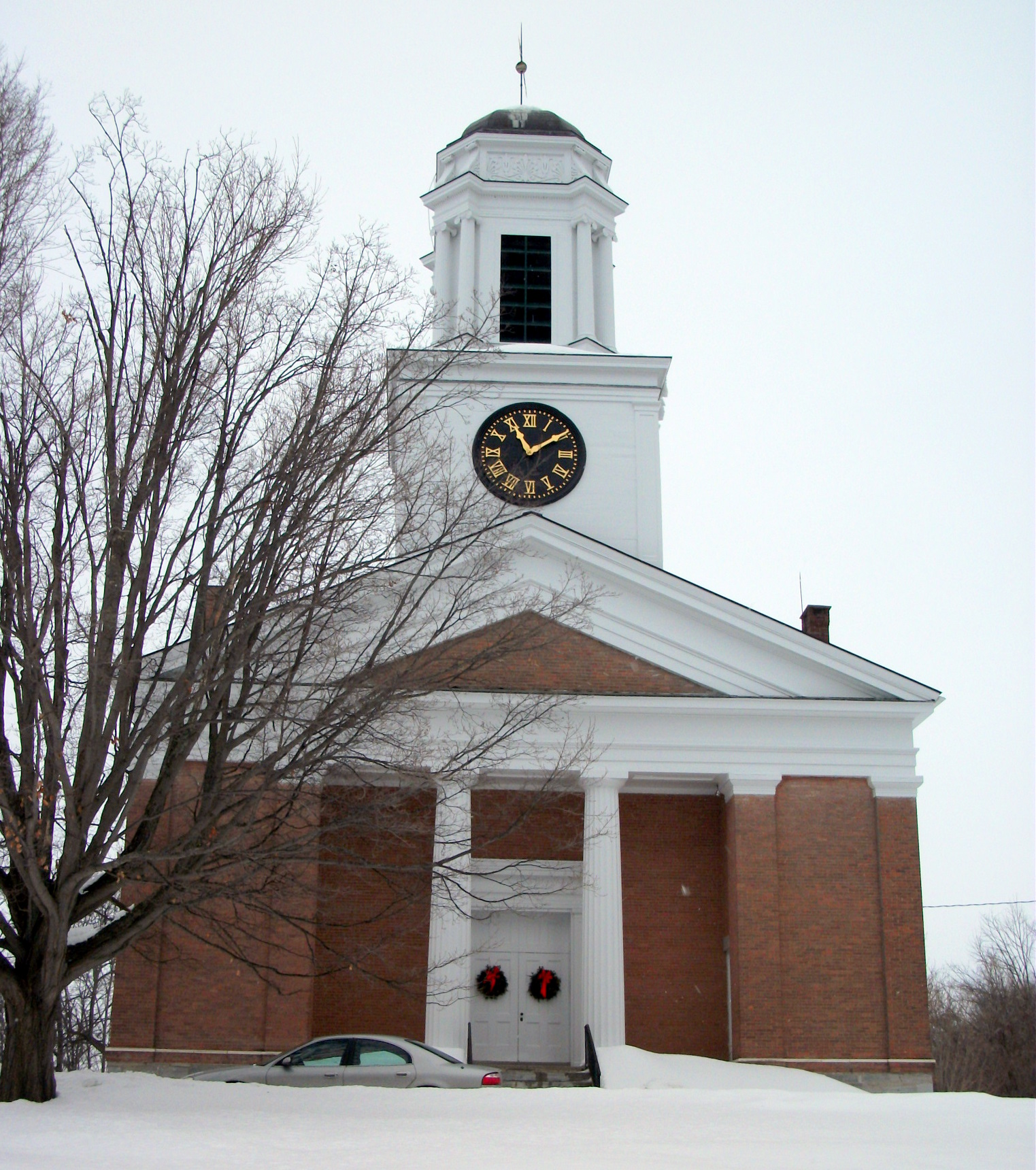
- Orwell Congregational Church, February 2011

- Location within Vermont Location within the United States
- Location: 464 Main St., Orwell, Vermont
- Coordinates: 43°48′15″N 73°18′3″W
- Area: 1.1 acres (0.45 ha)
- Built: 1843
- Architect: Bostwick, Frederick and Fobes
- Architectural style: Greek Revival
- MPS: Religious Buildings, Sites and Structures in Vermont MPS
- NRHP reference No.: 01000210
- Added to NRHP: March 2, 2001

The First Congregational Church (or Orwell Congregational Church) is a historic church in Orwell, Vermont. The current meeting house was built in 1843, and is one of state's best examples of Greek Revival ecclesiastical architecture. It was listed on the National Register of Historic Places in 2001.

== Architecture ==
The First Congregational Church stands prominently in the village center of Orwell, near the western end of an oval drive on the north side of Main Street (Vermont Route 73). It is an imposing single-story brick building, with a gabled roof and two-stage tower. The first stage of the tower is square with corner pilasters, and houses a clock. The second stage is an octagonal belfry, with four rectangular louvered faces separated by angled faces with paired fluted Ionic columns. It is topped by an octagonal cupola. The front facade has a fully pedimented gable above an entablature supported by four brick pilasters and two fluted Doric columns. The columns and inner pilaster demarcate a sheltered recess housing the main entrance.

The church was built by the membership, and retains much of its original form. The sanctuary windows, originally clear glass, began to be replaced by stained glass memorial windows in the late 19th century. One, the Children's Window, is unique in New England, as it was paid for by the children of the Sunday School in memory of other children of the church.

== History ==
The church is an independent congregation "gathered" in 1789. The stained glass windows are not simply colored glass, but traditional stained glass windows, which illustrate Bible stories and teaching, such as Jesus and the children, the Trinity, and more. The sanctuary, which seats approximately 350, has its original pews, many of which were originally "family pews", purchased or rented by members of the church when the building was built. As recently as the late 20th century, some members still sat in their family's traditional pew, although the seating is now open to all. The fine acoustics lend themselves to organ concerts, congregational singing and makes easier preaching from the large Victorian pulpit. Music has long been a hallmark of the church, with organists serving for many years at the fine Hook-Tracker organ, built in the 1860s and restored in the early 1990s. This small instrument of only 16 stops two keyboards (including the pedal board)is nonetheless a versatile instrument. The church's parsonage, at the corner of Main and Church Streets, was built ca. 1825, originally in the shape of a cross, but the two additional wings have since been removed.

== See also ==
- National Register of Historic Places listings in Addison County, Vermont
