= Chicago, Milwaukee & St. Paul Narrow Gauge Depot-LaMotte =

- Formerly listed on the U.S. National Register of Historic Places
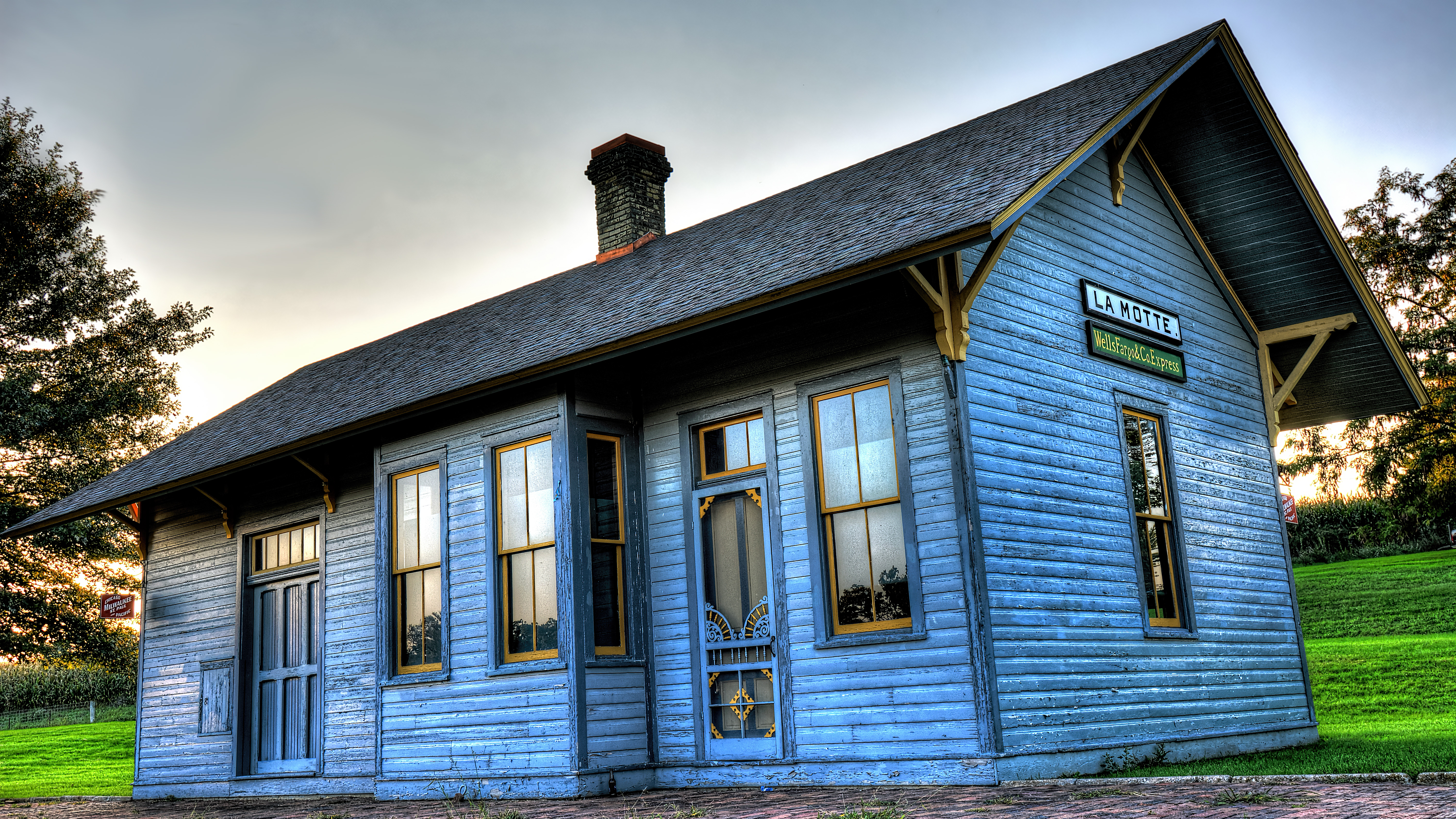

- Location within Iowa Location within the United States
- Location: Market St. La Motte, Iowa
- Coordinates: 42°17′33″N 90°37′17″W
- Area: less than one acre
- Built: 1911
- Architect: Chicago, Milwaukee & St. Paul Railroad
- MPS: Advent & Development of Railroads in Iowa MPS
- NRHP reference No.: 95000105

Significant dates
- Added to NRHP: February 17, 1995
- Removed from NRHP: September 8, 2022

The Chicago, Milwaukee & St. Paul Narrow Gauge Depot-LaMotte is a historic building formerly located in La Motte, Iowa, United States. The Chicago, Bellevue, Cascade & Western Railroad was incorporated in August 1877, to build a narrow-gauge railway from Bellevue to Cascade. Narrow-gauge was chosen because it was cheaper to build, and it could negotiate the tight turns on the rugged terrain better. Construction began the following year, but lack of money doomed the project. The Chicago, Clinton, Dubuque and Minnesota Railroad took over the project, and it was completed on December 30, 1879. The first train reached Cascade on January 1, 1880. Ten months later they sold all their holdings to the Chicago, Milwaukee & St. Paul Railroad, and this line became a branch line of the Milwaukee Road. That same year a frame depot was built in La Motte. It served as a combination freight and passenger station until it was destroyed by fire in 1910. This depot replaced it the following year. The 1½-story frame combination station represents the corporate style and standardized practices of the Milwaukee Road. However, it reflects the depots they built in the late 19th century, so it was somewhat outdated when it was built.

The depot served its purpose until the Milwaukee Road abandoned the line in 1936. There were 12 to 15 narrow gauge railroads built in Iowa, and this one survived longer than any of the others. The depot mostly sat empty until its exterior was refurbished by a group of volunteers for La Motte's Centennial in 1979. Rick Clasen, a local restaurant owner, bought the property in 1994 and continued to refurbish it. It was listed on the National Register of Historic Places (NRHP) the following year. When Clasen sold the property he donated the building to the Jackson County Historical Society, who moved it to the Clinton Engines Site in Maquoketa, Iowa. It was removed from the NRHP in 2022.

Preceding station	Milwaukee Road	Following station
Zwingle toward Cascade	Cascade – Bellevue	Bellevue Terminus
