= Mining in Dubuque =

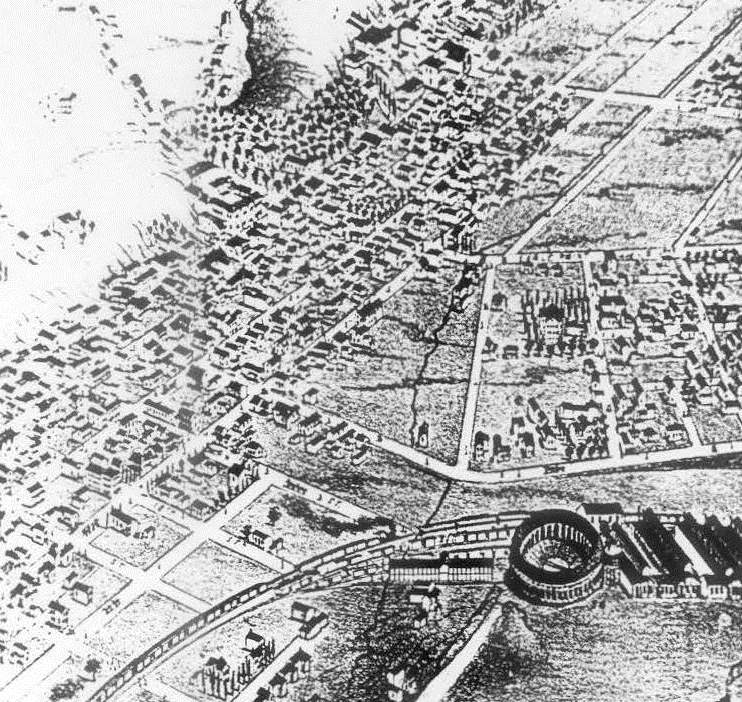
An aerial view of Dubuque in 1872 by Alexander Koch, slightly after the time of peak lead production.

Dubuque, Iowa and its surrounding region has a history involving the mining of the area's lead-zinc deposits along with other metals like iron. Both natives and Europeans were using the metals in the region. The first European in the area, Julien Dubuque, received a lease from the natives to mine. Eventually, the mines were shut down.

== Metals ==
=== Native American usage ===
Even though the natives did not smelt metals, they still found uses for them. Using iron, they could make black paint by grinding the iron up into a powder and mixing it with water.

Native Americans did not tell Europeans about the locations of their mines. Julien Dubuque would eventually be the exception.

Lead ore was traded by the Meskwaki to the English and French. Shot would be made from that lead by the Europeans, who would then trade it to the natives.

=== European usage ===
Lead deposits on the continent had been mined for a long time before Dubuque's mines. Before 1650, French colonizers practiced basic lead mining and smelting. Europe found out about the lead by 1682 due to the writings of Nicolas Perrot. Perrot first mined for lead in the area in 1690.

In 1788, Julien Dubuque obtained a lease of land from the Sauk and Meskwaki for mining purposes from the Little Maquoketa River to the Tete Des Morts Creek. The grant was confirmed by the Spanish Louisianan governor in 1796. Until Dubuque died in 1810, he ran the Mines of Spain from a town near the mouth of Catfish Creek. Just before he died though, he lost financial control of the mines. Lead mining collapsed and legal issues ensued after his death. The US Army then took over the mines. Legal issues related to ownership were not fixed until the U.S. Supreme Court declared that any ownership claims stemming from Julien Dubuque was invalid.

A lead rush of people from the East Coast and Europe ensued as people learned about the veins in 1820s. By 1829, over 4,000 mining permits were issued. The US army did require that 10% of all lead would be given to them.

In the 1830s, miners from Galena, Illinois learned about the mines. They obtained permission from the natives to start mining. One of the first of these mines was Langworthy crevice. However, in order to keep a treaty with the natives, the federal government ordered that the miners leave. To enforce the order, they sent troops from Prairie du Chien, Wisconsin. After the Black Hawk War, the area around Dubuque was able to be settled. Large amounts of prospecting ensued.

Between 1845 and 1847, Dubuque's lead district reached its peak in production at 54,000,000 pounds (24,000,000 kg) per year, more than any other lead district in the world.

=== Closing ===
Dubuque's mines were shut down in 1910. The failure was due to an exhaustion of all the surface deposits and eventually, miners hit the water table. Costs outweighed the profits, ending the mines. However, a small attempt at reviving the mines was made in the early 1950s. The last mine in the entire Upper Mississippi Valley in Shullsburg, Wisconsin was closed in 1979.

== Quarries ==
In 2010, limestone mined from a quarry near Dubuque was used in the construction of a federal courthouse in Cedar Rapids.

In 2022, residents of Peosta began protesting quarry activity as the owners of the quarry attempted to get their property rezoned as heavy industry.
