= Swiss Valley (Iowa) =

Valley in Dubuque County, Iowa

Geography
- Country: United States
- State: Iowa
- Coordinates: 42.4425°N 90.72985°W
- River: Swiss Valley Creek and Monastery Creek
- Interactive map of Swiss Valley

Swiss Valley is a valley in Dubuque County, Iowa, United States. Inside the valley is a 65 acres (26 ha) park and a branch of the Catfish Creek.

== Etymology ==
The valley was named after the original settlers to the area who were Swiss.

== History ==
In 2025, flooding damaged the park and campground, including trees, bridges, and prairies within.

== Geography ==
The Swiss Valley is found about 3–4 miles (4.8–6.4 km) from Dubuque, Iowa. In it is a branch of the Catfish Creek, known as the Swiss Valley Creek, that flows through. A tributary of the Swiss Valley Creek, known as Monastery Creek, is reserved for trout fingerlings.

== Swiss Valley Park ==
Amenities at the park include a picnic area, trails, a playground, restrooms and camping.

Trout, stocked by the Iowa DNR, are fished at the park.
