= Julien Dubuque =

French-Canadian trader known for founding Dubuque

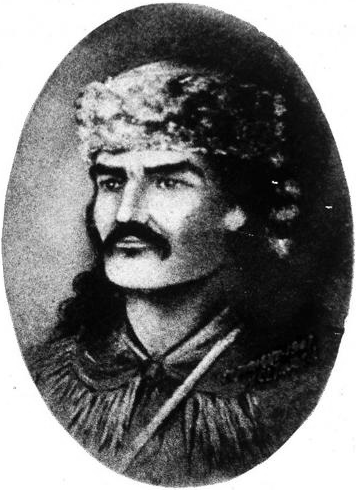
- An artist's conception of Julien Dubuque
- Born: Champlain, Quebec
- Resting place: Julien Dubuque Monument
- Occupations: Explorer, Miner
- Employer: Spanish Empire
- Known for: Founding Dubuque

Julien Dubuque (January 1762 – 24 March 1810) was a Canadian of Norman origin from the area of Champlain, Quebec who arrived near what now is known as Dubuque, Iowa, which was named after him. He was one of the first European men to settle in the area. He initially received permission from the Meskwaki people to mine the lead in 1788, which was confirmed by the Spanish, who gave him a land grant in 1796.

Once he had received permission from the Meskwaki to mine lead, Dubuque remained in the area for the rest of his life. He befriended the local Meskwaki chief Peosta – for whom the nearby town of Peosta, Iowa is named. It is widely believed that Dubuque married Peosta's daughter, named Potosa. The marriage is disputed. Those who back the marriage claim point to letters that mention a Madame Dubuque as meaning Dubuque's wife.

After his death, the Meskwaki built a log crypt for Dubuque, which was replaced in the late 19th century by an imposing stone monument.

The name "Potosa" often appears in fanciful origin stories for the name of Potosi, Wisconsin, a small town founded in the 1830s as a lead-mining settlement located north of Dubuque.

== Legacy ==
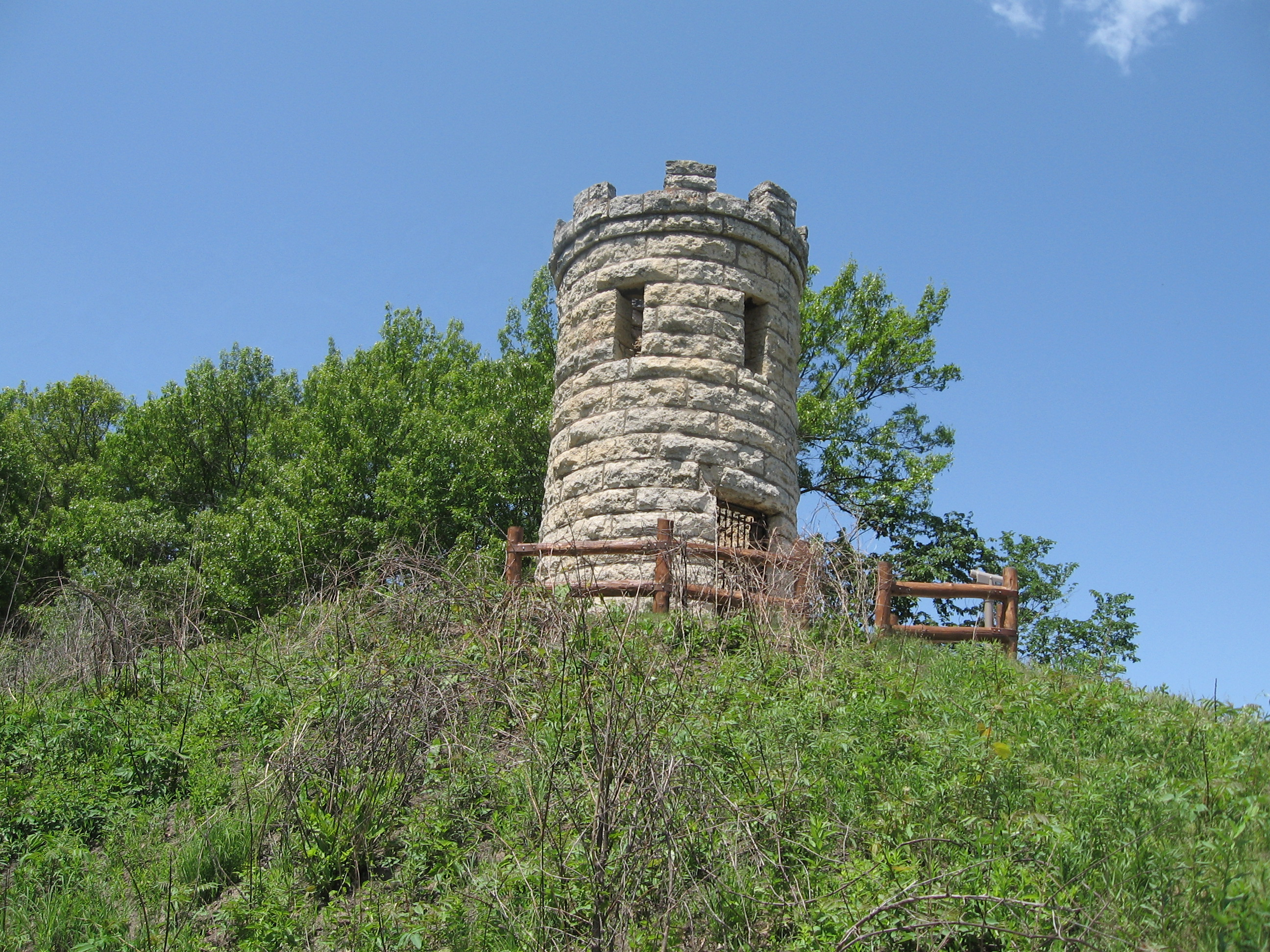
Julien Dubuque monument

Dubuque is remembered as the first person of European origin to settle in what would become the state of Iowa. He is remembered as a friend of the Native Americans in the area and a champion of their cause. Dubuque was also a generous man who spent lavishly on many friends, which had the unfortunate effect of keeping him in debt during the later part of his life.

When White Americans settled what would become Iowa, a settlement in the area where he had mined was named after him. It was known by several names, including DuBuque's Mines. Eventually, it became the first city in Iowa, and was named simply Dubuque in his honor. Dubuque's resting place and memorial lie on a cliff facing the Mississippi river at the Julien Dubuque Monument in the Mines of Spain State Recreation Area and E. B. Lyons Nature Center.

== Facial reconstruction ==
In 2012, members of the Dubuque County Historical Society and curators at the National Mississippi River Museum asked forensic artist Karen T. Taylor to create a facial reconstruction based on the skull of Dubuque. Upon his death in 1810, he was buried on a high bluff overlooking the Mississippi River. In the late 1800s, the original log mausoleum was replaced by the limestone tower and monument at the same site. At that time, excellent photographs were made of Dubuque's skull prior to reburial. Though Dubuque's actual skull now lies buried under many feet of concrete, Taylor was able to use the multiple 1887 photographs, along with historic and anthropological inputs to create a reasonable depiction of his appearance in life. The facial reconstruction images are on display at the National Mississippi River Museum & Aquarium in Dubuque, Iowa.

== Gallery ==
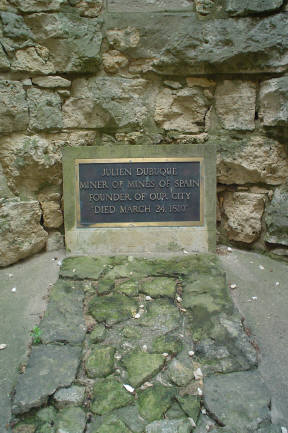
Dubuque's gravesite

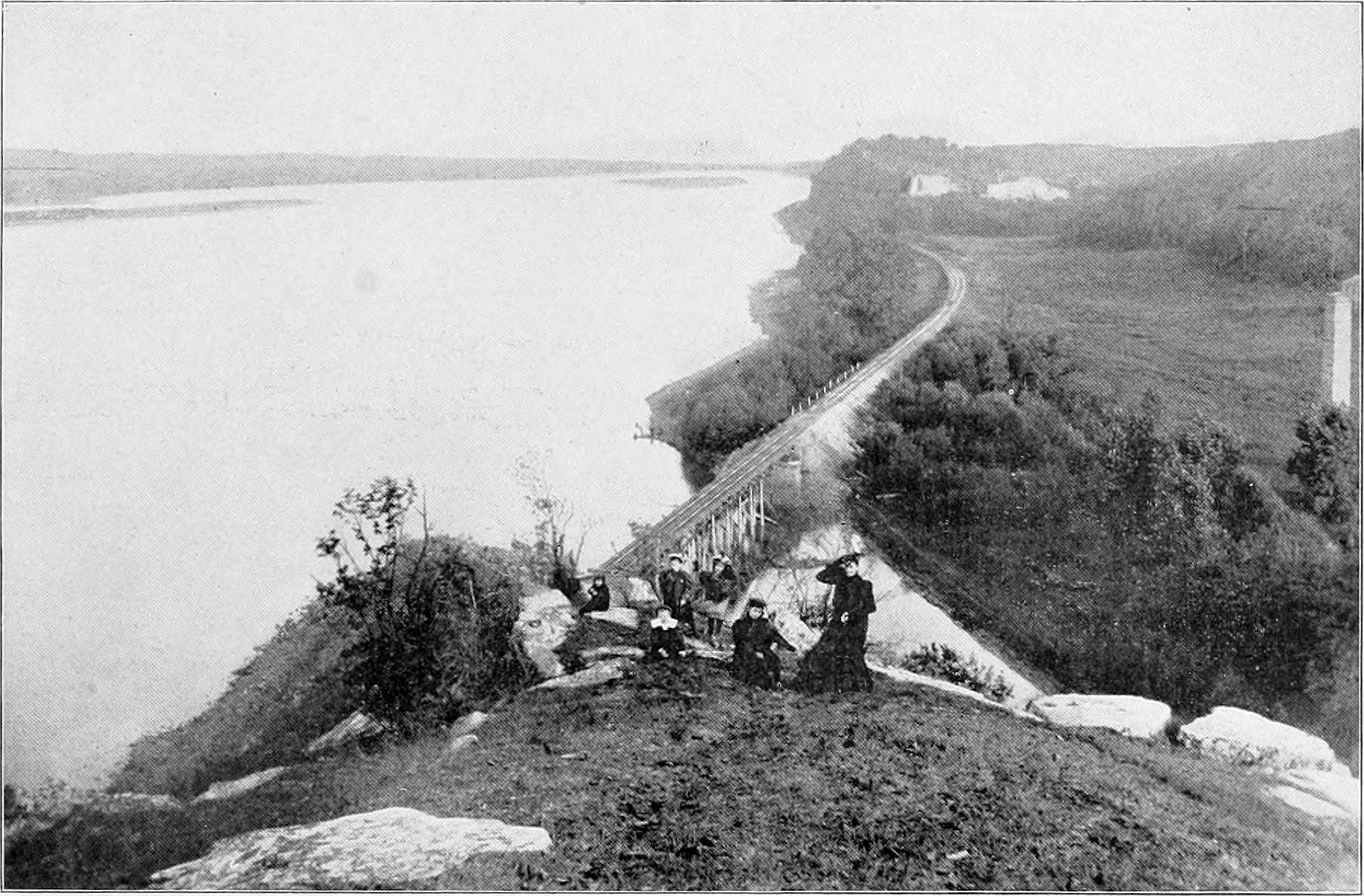
Dubuque's gravesite, 1897

Chief Peosta's gravesite
