= National Register of Historic Places listings in Dubuque County, Iowa =

Location of Dubuque County in Iowa

This is a list of the National Register of Historic Places listings in Dubuque County, Iowa.

This is intended to be a complete list of the properties and districts on the National Register of Historic Places in Dubuque County, Iowa, United States. Latitude and longitude coordinates are provided for many National Register properties and districts; these locations may be seen together in a map.

There are 85 properties and districts listed on the National Register in the county, including three National Historic Landmarks.

This National Park Service list is complete through NPS recent listings posted October 23, 2026.

== Current listings ==
| | Name on the Register | Image | Date listed | Location | City or town | Description |
|---|---|---|---|---|---|---|
| 1 | Allen House | Allen House | July 10, 1975 (#75000686) | 515 1st Ave., W. 42°29′03″N 91°07′50″W | Dyersville | |
| 2 | Andrew-Ryan House | Andrew-Ryan House | April 11, 1985 (#85000720) | 1375 Locust; 42°30′17″N 90°40′16″W | Dubuque | |
| 3 | Basilica of St. Francis Xavier, Church and Rectory | Basilica of St. Francis Xavier, Church and Rectory | September 29, 1999 (#99001205) | 114 Second Street, S.W. 42°29′04″N 91°07′33″W | Dyersville | |
| 4 | John Bell Block | John Bell Block | December 20, 2002 (#02001540) | 1301-07 Central Ave. 42°30′21″N 90°39′59″W | Dubuque | |
| 5 | Bishop's Block | Bishop's Block | May 19, 1994 (#94000477) | 90 W. Main St. 42°29′40″N 90°39′49″W | Dubuque | |
| 6 | Carnegie-Stout Public Library | Carnegie-Stout Public Library | August 1, 1975 (#75000684) | 11th and Bluff Sts. 42°30′09″N 90°40′12″W | Dubuque | |
| 7 | Cathedral Historic District | Cathedral Historic District | September 25, 1985 (#85002501) | Roughly bounded by a bluffline running west of Bluff St., W. 7th, Locust, and Jones Sts. 42°29′48″N 90°40′03″W | Dubuque | It includes 96 contributing buildings, including St. Raphael's Cathedral and United States Post Office and Courthouse (Dubuque, Iowa, 1934). |
| 8 | Concord Congregational Cemetery | Concord Congregational Cemetery | October 27, 2017 (#100001215) | 21755 N. U.S. Route 52; 42°35′09″N 90°54′45″W | Durango vicinity | |
| 9 | Cottage Hill Methodist-Episcopal Cemetery | Cottage Hill Methodist-Episcopal Cemetery | June 19, 2017 (#100001216) | 22001 N. U.S. Route 52; 42°35′02″N 90°55′04″W | Durango | |
| 10 | Diamond Jo Boat Store and Office | Diamond Jo Boat Store and Office | November 23, 1977 (#77000512) | Jones and Water Sts. 42°29′35″N 90°39′32″W | Dubuque | |
| 11 | Dubuque Casket Company | Dubuque Casket Company | February 9, 2006 (#06000003) | 1798 Washington St. 42°30′37″N 90°39′58″W | Dubuque | |
| 12 | Dubuque City Hall | Dubuque City Hall | September 14, 1972 (#72000472) | 50 W. 13th St. 42°30′19″N 90°40′03″W | Dubuque | |
| 13 | Dubuque County Courthouse | Dubuque County Courthouse | June 23, 1971 (#71000298) | 720 Central Ave. 42°30′04″N 90°39′52″W | Dubuque | part of the County Courthouses in Iowa Thematic Resource (TR) (AD) |
| 14 | Dubuque County Jail | Dubuque County Jail | June 27, 1972 (#72000473) | 36 E. 8th St. 42°30′04″N 90°39′53″W | Dubuque | |
| 15 | Dubuque Freight House | Dubuque Freight House | October 11, 1979 (#79003693) | E. 3rd St. Extension; 42°29′46″N 90°39′37″W | Dubuque | |
| 16 | Dubuque Millworking Historic District | Dubuque Millworking Historic District | November 7, 2008 (#08001030) | White, Jackson, and Elm between E. 6th and E. 11th Sts. 42°30′11″N 90°39′49″W | Dubuque | part of the Dubuque, Iowa Multiple Property Submission (MPS) |
| 17 | Dubuque Star Brewery | Dubuque Star Brewery | April 24, 2007 (#07000348) | 500 E. 5th St. 42°29′58″N 90°39′15″W | Dubuque | part of the Dubuque, Iowa MPS |
| 18 | Dubuque Trading Post-Village of Kettle Chief Archeological District | Dubuque Trading Post-Village of Kettle Chief Archeological District | November 21, 1988 (#88002665) | Address Restricted | Dubuque | part of the Mines of Spain Archeological MPS |
| 19 | Dubuque YMCA Building | Dubuque YMCA Building | January 31, 2002 (#01001541) | 125 W. 9th St. 42°30′07″N 90°40′00″W | Dubuque | |
| 20 | Julien Dubuque Bridge | Julien Dubuque Bridge | August 27, 1999 (#99001034) | U.S. Route 20 over the Mississippi River; 42°29′30″N 90°39′17″W | Dubuque | part of the Highway Bridges of Iowa MPS |
| 21 | Julien Dubuque Monument | Julien Dubuque Monument | November 21, 1988 (#88002662) | Confluence of the Mississippi River and Catfish Creek in Mines of Spain State Recreation Area; 42°28′07″N 90°38′47″W | Dubuque | part of the Mines of Spain Archeological MPS |
| 22 | Dunleith and Dubuque Bridge | Dunleith and Dubuque Bridge | September 11, 2013 (#13000690) | 7600 Chavenelle Drive; 42°29′21″N 90°46′33″W | Dubuque | |
| 23 | Eagle Point Park Historic District | Eagle Point Park Historic District | November 27, 2017 (#100001834) | 2601 Shiras Ave. 42°29′21″N 90°46′33″W | Dubuque | |
| 24 | Epworth School | Epworth School | April 21, 2004 (#04000340) | 310 W. Main St. 42°26′46″N 90°56′08″W | Epworth | |
| 25 | Fenelon Place Residential Historic District | Fenelon Place Residential Historic District | November 16, 2015 (#15000787) | Hill St., 3 & 5th Sts., W., Fenelon Pl., Fenelon Place Elevator; 42°29′46″N 90°40′11″W | Dubuque | |
| 26 | Fenelon Place Elevator | Fenelon Place Elevator | August 3, 1978 (#78001215) | 512 Fenelon Pl. 42°29′47″N 90°40′08″W | Dubuque | |
| 27 | Four Mounds Estate Historic District | Four Mounds Estate Historic District | January 24, 2002 (#01001487) | 4900 Peru Rd. 42°33′21″N 90°40′51″W | Dubuque | |
| 28 | Four Mounds Site | Four Mounds Site | November 17, 2000 (#00001076) | Address Restricted | Dubuque | |
| 29 | Garland House | Garland House | July 7, 1983 (#83000353) | 1090 Langworthy Ave. 42°29′37″N 90°40′39″W | Dubuque | |
| 30 | German Bank | German Bank | March 28, 1978 (#78001216) | 342 Main St. 42°29′50″N 90°39′53″W | Dubuque | |
| 31 | Grand Opera House | Grand Opera House | September 20, 2002 (#02001029) | 135 8th St. 42°30′06″N 90°39′56″W | Dubuque | part of the Footlights in Farm Country: Iowa Opera Houses MPS |
| 32 | Haberkorn House and Farmstead | Haberkorn House and Farmstead | January 25, 1980 (#80001449) | West of Sherrill; 42°36′24″N 90°49′21″W | Sherrill | |
| 33 | Mathias Ham House | Mathias Ham House | July 19, 1976 (#76000764) | 2241 Lincoln Ave. 42°31′53″N 90°39′02″W | Dubuque | |
| 34 | Charles T. Hancock House | Charles T. Hancock House | April 10, 1986 (#86000741) | 1105 Grove Terr. 42°30′10″N 90°40′17″W | Dubuque | |
| 35 | Ora Holland House | Ora Holland House | August 14, 1986 (#86001613) | 1296 Mt. Pleasant St. 42°30′02″N 90°41′04″W | Dubuque | |
| 36 | Hollenfelz House | Hollenfelz House | September 13, 1977 (#77000513) | 1651 White St. 42°30′30″N 90°40′05″W | Dubuque | |
| 37 | Holy Ghost Catholic Historic District | Holy Ghost Catholic Historic District | September 15, 2011 (#11000661) | 2887-2921 Central Ave. 42°31′26″N 90°40′46″W | Dubuque | part of the Dubuque, Iowa MPS |
| 38 | Interstate Power Company Building | Interstate Power Company Building | June 26, 2008 (#08000328) | 1000 Main and 131 W. 10th St. 42°30′09″N 90°40′05″W | Dubuque | part of the Dubuque, Iowa MPS |
| 39 | Jackson Park Historic District | Jackson Park Historic District | July 31, 1986 (#86002102) | Roughly bounded by 17th, Iowa, 10th and 9th, and Bluff and Montrose Sts. 42°30′21″N 90°40′12″W | Dubuque | |
| 40 | Kelley House | Kelley House | January 30, 1978 (#78001217) | 274 Southern Ave. 42°29′07″N 90°39′51″W | Dubuque | |
| 41 | Zephaniah Kidder House | Zephaniah Kidder House | November 14, 1978 (#78001218) | 206 First Avenue, N.E. 42°26′47″N 90°55′44″W | Epworth | |
| 42 | Langworthy Historic District | Langworthy Historic District | August 12, 2004 (#04000813) | Langworthy, W. 3rd, Melrose Terrace, Hill and W. 5th, Alpine and Walnut between Solon and W. 5th 42°29′42″N 90°40′40″W | Dubuque | part of the Dubuque, Iowa MPS |
| 43 | Langworthy House | Langworthy House | October 14, 1975 (#75000685) | 1095 West Third Street; 42°29′42″N 90°40′45″W | Dubuque | |
| 44 | Lincoln School | | July 24, 1975 (#75000687) | About 4 miles (6.4 km) north of Farley; 42°29′24″N 90°59′07″W | Farley | |
| 45 | Lock and Dam No. 11 Historic District | Lock and Dam No. 11 Historic District | March 10, 2004 (#04000171) | 11 Lime St. 42°32′03″N 90°38′44″W | Dubuque | part of the Upper Mississippi River 9-Foot Navigation Project MPS |
| 46 | T. Ben Loetscher House | T. Ben Loetscher House | November 2, 1989 (#89001777) | 160 S. Grandview Ave. 42°29′25″N 90°41′02″W | Dubuque | |
| 47 | Loras College Historic District | Loras College Historic District | June 19, 2020 (#100005277) | Roughly bounded by Alta Vista St., Loras Blvd., Kirkwood St., Cox St., West 17th St., and Henion St. 42°30′14″N 90°40′49″W | Dubuque | |
| 48 | McMahon House | McMahon House | November 21, 1976 (#76000765) | 800 English Lane; 42°28′48″N 90°40′19″W | Dubuque | |
| 49 | Memorial Building | Memorial Building | April 9, 2013 (#13000148) | 340 1st Ave., E. 42°29′05″N 91°07′15″W | Dyersville | |
| 50 | Metz Manufacturing Company | | June 21, 2021 (#100006658) | 1690 Elm St. 42°30′35″N 90°39′54″W | Dubuque | |
| 51 | Mines of Spain Area Rural Community Archeological District | Mines of Spain Area Rural Community Archeological District | November 21, 1988 (#88002663) | Address Restricted | Dubuque | part of the Mines of Spain Archeological MPS |
| 52 | Mines of Spain Lead Mining Community Archeological District | Mines of Spain Lead Mining Community Archeological District | November 21, 1988 (#88002664) | Address Restricted | Dubuque | part of the Mines of Spain Archeological MPS |
| 53 | Mines of Spain Prehistoric District | Mines of Spain Prehistoric District | November 21, 1988 (#88002666) | Address Restricted | Dubuque | part of the Mines of Spain Archeological MPS |
| 54 | Mount Saint Bernard Seminary and Barn | Mount Saint Bernard Seminary and Barn | November 5, 1974 (#74000784) | 10336 Military Rd. 42°26′36″N 90°41′36″W | Dubuque | |
| 55 | Old Chapel Hall | Old Chapel Hall | August 5, 1983 (#83000355) | 2050 University Ave. 42°29′55″N 90°41′34″W | Dubuque | |
| 56 | Old Main Street Historic District | Old Main Street Historic District | January 12, 1983 (#83000356) | Main St. between 1st and 4th Sts. 42°29′47″N 90°39′53″W | Dubuque | Boundary increases were approved October 13, 2015 and October 26, 2026. |
| 57 | Orpheum Theatre and Site | Orpheum Theatre and Site | November 14, 1972 (#72000474) | 405 Main St. 42°29′52″N 90°39′55″W | Dubuque | |
| 58 | Johann Christian Frederick Rath House | Johann Christian Frederick Rath House | April 11, 1977 (#77000514) | 1204 Mt. Loretta Ave. 42°29′04″N 90°40′29″W | Dubuque | |
| 59 | Redstone | Redstone | December 12, 1976 (#76000766) | 504 Bluff St. 42°29′49″N 90°40′03″W | Dubuque | |
| 60 | George W. Rogers Company Shot Tower | George W. Rogers Company Shot Tower | November 7, 1976 (#76000767) | Commercial St. and riverfront 42°30′01″N 90°39′18″W | Dubuque | |
| 61 | Roshek Brothers Department Store | Roshek Brothers Department Store | March 17, 2010 (#10000076) | 250 W. 8th St. 42°30′01″N 90°40′08″W | Dubuque | |
| 62 | Round Barn, Dubuque Township | Round Barn, Dubuque Township | June 30, 1986 (#86001425) | 2810 Cascade Rd. 42°28′24″N 90°42′27″W | Dubuque Township | part of the Iowa Round Barns: The Sixty Year Experiment TR |
| 63 | Sacred Heart School | Sacred Heart School | June 1, 2018 (#100002486) | 2238 Queen St. 42°31′01″N 90°40′02″W | Dubuque | |
| 64 | St. Boniface of New Vienna Historic District | St. Boniface of New Vienna Historic District | September 29, 1999 (#99001207) | 7401 Columbus St. 42°33′03″N 91°06′54″W | New Vienna | |
| 65 | St. Luke's Methodist Episcopal Church | St. Luke's Methodist Episcopal Church | April 23, 1998 (#98000387) | 1199 Main St. 42°30′13″N 90°40′09″W | Dubuque | |
| 66 | St. Mary's Catholic Church Historic District | St. Mary's Catholic Church Historic District | July 21, 2015 (#15000436) | 105 E. 15th, 1584 White, 1501 & 1561 Jackson Sts. 42°30′29″N 90°40′01″W | Dubuque | |
| 67 | Sauser-Lane House | Sauser-Lane House | July 14, 1983 (#83000354) | 101 2nd Ave., SW. 42°17′52″N 91°00′43″W | Cascade | |
| 68 | Schroeder-Klein Grocery Company Warehouse | Schroeder-Klein Grocery Company Warehouse | February 28, 2011 (#11000051) | 40-48 Main St. 42°29′34″N 90°39′46″W | Dubuque | part of the Dubuque, Iowa MPS |
| 69 | John and Marie (Palen) Schrup Farmstead Historic District | John and Marie (Palen) Schrup Farmstead Historic District | September 16, 2009 (#09000713) | 10086 Lake Eleanor Rd. 42°25′24″N 90°39′35″W | Dubuque | |
| 70 | Security Building | Security Building | August 8, 2006 (#06000681) | 800 Main St. 42°30′04″N 90°40′01″W | Dubuque | part of the Dubuque, Iowa MPS |
| 71 | Seminary Hill Residential Historic District | Seminary Hill Residential Historic District | October 13, 2015 (#15000723) | Clarke Dr., N. Main & Madison Sts., Madison Park; 42°30′33″N 90°40′19″W | Dubuque | |
| 72 | Sherrill Mount House | Sherrill Mount House | July 11, 2002 (#02000760) | 5259 S. Mound Rd. 42°36′15″N 90°47′33″W | Sherrill | 1856; Jesse James reportedly stayed here; now the Black Horse Inn |
| 73 | J.H. Thedinga House | J.H. Thedinga House | November 7, 1976 (#76000768) | 340 W. 5th St. 42°29′51″N 90°40′04″W | Dubuque | |
| 74 | Town Clock Building | Town Clock Building | January 24, 2002 (#01001488) | 823-25 Main St. 42°30′04″N 90°40′02″W | Dubuque | |
| 75 | Upper Central Avenue Commercial Historic District | Upper Central Avenue Commercial Historic District | September 19, 2012 (#12000793) | 1460-1965 Central Ave. 42°30′32″N 90°40′09″W | Dubuque | part of the Dubuque, Iowa MPS |
| 76 | Upper Iowa Street Historic District | Upper Iowa Street Historic District | October 13, 2015 (#15000724) | Iowa St. between W. 11th & 12th Sts. 42°30′15″N 90°40′03″W | Dubuque | |
| 77 | Upper Main Street Historic District | Upper Main Street Historic District | April 11, 2005 (#05000275) | 1000 and 1100 blocks of Main St. • Boundary increase (listed February 11, 2011, refnum 11000003): 909, 951, 955, 965 Main St. 42°30′07″N 90°40′05″W | Dubuque | part of the Dubuque, Iowa MPS |
| 78 | Washington Mill Bridge | Washington Mill Bridge | June 25, 1998 (#98000788) | Creek Branch Ln. over Lytle Creek; 42°18′15″N 90°46′49″W | Bernard | part of the Highway Bridges of Iowa MPS |
| 79 | Washington Park | Washington Park | July 14, 1977 (#77000515) | Bounded by 6th, 7th, Bluff, and Locust Sts. 42°29′57″N 90°40′05″W | Dubuque | |
| 80 | Washington Street and East 22nd Street Historic District | Washington Street and East 22nd Street Historic District | February 28, 2011 (#11000052) | 2162-2255 Washington St. and E. 22nd St. 42°30′52″N 90°40′08″W | Dubuque | part of the Dubuque, Iowa MPS |
| 81 | Washington Residential Historic District | Washington Residential Historic District | October 13, 2015 (#15000725) | 1100 - 1900 blocks White, Jackson & Washington Sts. 42°30′27″N 90°39′59″W | Dubuque | |
| 82 | West Eleventh Street Historic District | West Eleventh Street Historic District | August 12, 2004 (#04000814) | Bounded by Grove Terrace, Loras Boulevard, and Wilbur and Walnut Sts. 42°30′09″N 90°40′25″W | Dubuque | part of the Dubuque, Iowa MPS |
| 83 | Western Hotel | Western Hotel | November 7, 1976 (#76000769) | Southeast of Holy Cross on U.S. Route 52; 42°35′36″N 90°58′52″W | Holy Cross | |
| 84 | William M. Black (dredge) | William M. Black (dredge) | April 12, 1982 (#82002618) | E. 2nd St. 42°29′44″N 90°39′37″W | Dubuque | |
| 85 | Ziepprecht Block | Ziepprecht Block | December 20, 2002 (#02001541) | 1347-53 Central Ave. 42°30′21″N 90°39′59″W | Dubuque | |

== Former listings ==
| | Name on the Register | Image | Date listed | Date removed | Location | City or town | Description |
|---|---|---|---|---|---|---|---|
| 1 | Central High School | | September 16, 1982 (#82002617) | September 23, 1987 | 1500 Locust St. 42°30′23″N 90°40′17″W | Dubuque | |
| 2 | White Water Creek Bridge | White Water Creek Bridge | June 25, 1998 (#98000787) | May 9, 2012 | Whitewater Rd. over White Water Creek; 42°29′21″N 90°46′33″W | Bernard | Part of the Highway Bridges of Iowa MPS. Relocated to Bergfeld Recreation Area in Dubuque in 2011. |

== See also ==
- List of National Historic Landmarks in Iowa
- National Register of Historic Places listings in Iowa
- Listings in neighboring counties: Clayton, Delaware, Grant (WI), Jackson, Jo Daviess (IL), Jones
