= Dunleith and Dubuque Bridge =

- U.S. National Register of Historic Places
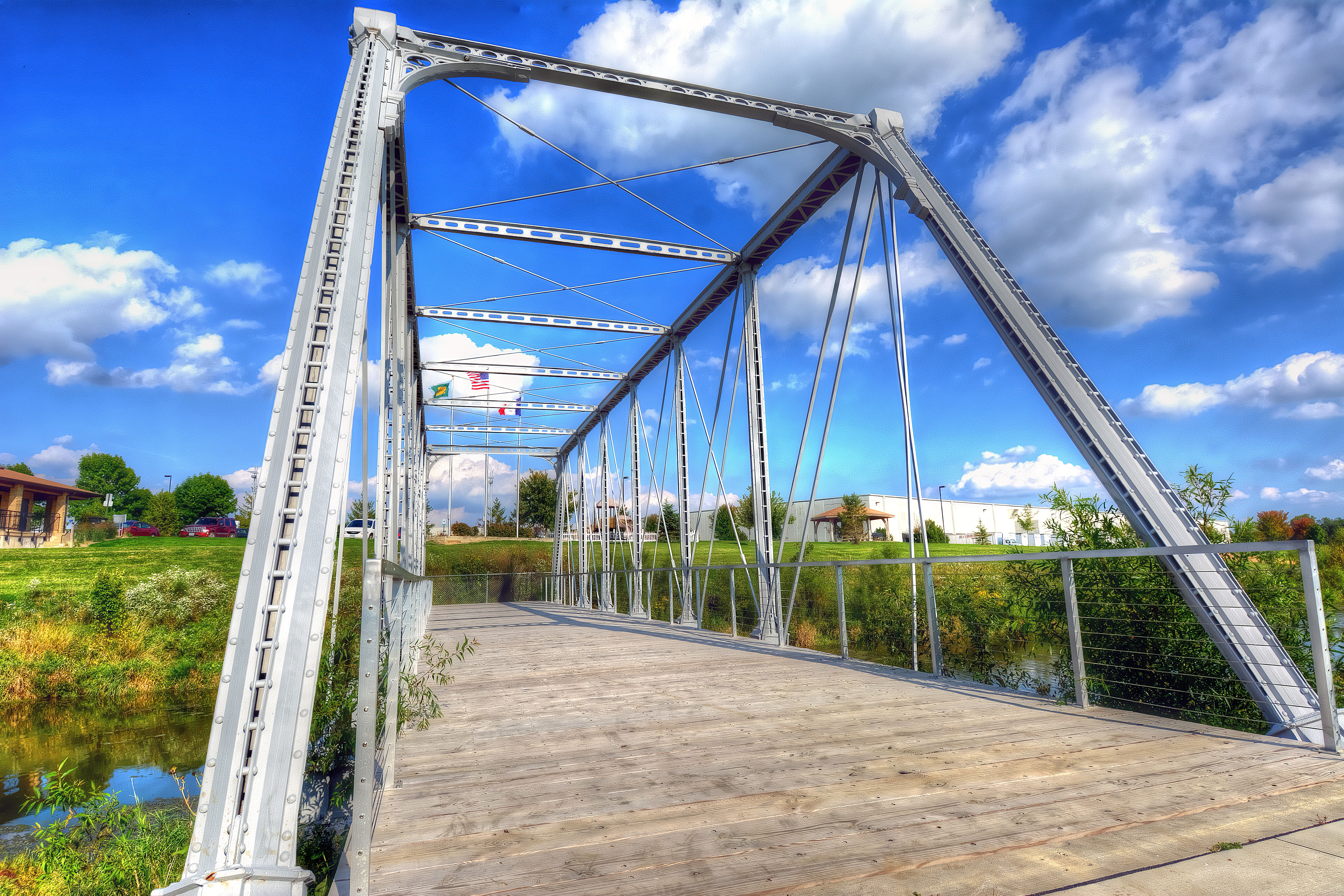

- Location within Iowa Location within the United States
- Location: 7600 Chavenelle Drive; Dubuque, Iowa
- Coordinates: 42°29′21.0″N 90°46′33.1″W
- Area: less than one acre
- Built: 1872
- Built by: Reynolds, Saulpaugh and Company
- Architect: Keystone Bridge Company
- Architectural style: Pratt through truss
- MPS: Highway Bridges of Iowa MPS
- NRHP reference No.: 13000690
- Added to NRHP: September 11, 2013

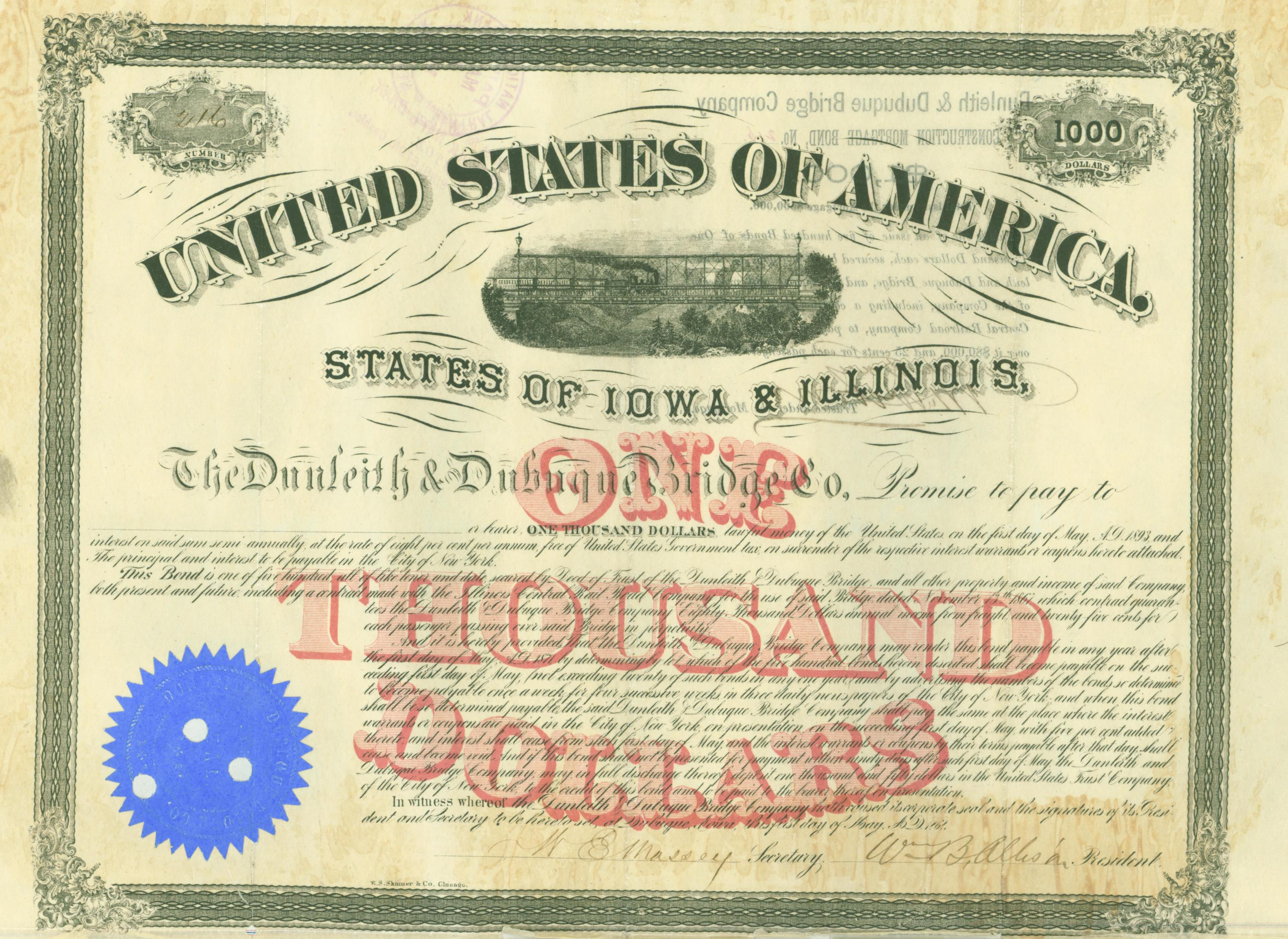
Bond of the Dunleith & Dubuque Bridge Company, issued 1st May 1868

The Dunleith and Dubuque Bridge, also known as the White Water Creek Bridge and the Bergfeld Recreation Area Bridge, is a historic structure located in Dubuque, Iowa, United States. This span was part of a seven-span approach to one of the first bridges constructed over the Mississippi River. It was part of a railroad bridge that connected Dubuque with Dunleith, Illinois, now known as East Dubuque. The bridge was fabricated by the Keystone Bridge Company of Pittsburgh, Pennsylvania. Andrew Carnegie himself traveled to Dubuque to advocate for his company to build the bridge. The bridge was erected by Reynolds, Saulpaugh and Company of Rock Island, Illinois. The approach, of which this iron truss was a part, was completed in 1872. It was used by the Illinois Central and other railroads.

By the end of the 19th century the bridge was no longer strong enough to carry the heavier trains then in use, and it was replaced. Dubuque County acquired two of the approach spans, including this one, in 1890. One was placed over the Cloie Branch of the Maquoketa River near Sageville. This one was placed over White Water Creek east of Cascade. In 1996 it was listed on the National Register of Historic Places. The span was removed in 1999 and stored at a nearby farm until 2010 when it was moved to the Bergfeld Recreation Area in western Dubuque. The White Water Creek Bridge was removed from the National Register in 2012. It was relisted as the Dunleith and Dubuque Bridge the following year.

== See also ==
- List of bridges documented by the Historic American Engineering Record in Iowa
- List of bridges on the National Register of Historic Places in Iowa
- National Register of Historic Places listings in Dubuque County, Iowa
