= Sherrill Mount House =

- U.S. National Register of Historic Places
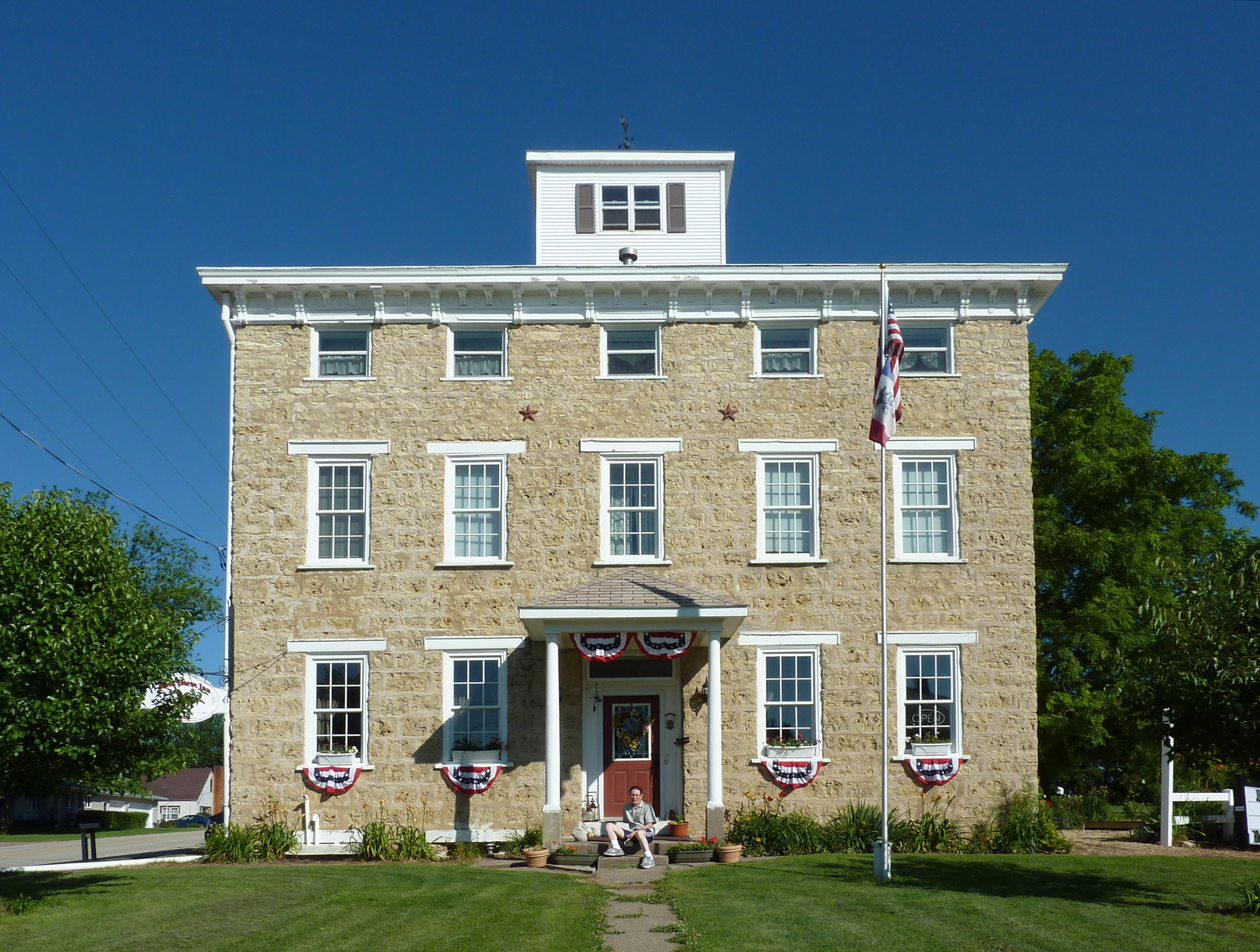

- Location within Iowa Location within the United States
- Location: 5259 S. Mound Rd. Sherrill, Iowa
- Coordinates: 42°36′14.8″N 90°47′06.2″W
- Area: less than one acre
- Built: 1856
- Built by: Peter Fries
- Architectural style: Mid 19th Century Revival
- NRHP reference No.: 02000760
- Added to NRHP: July 11, 2002

The Sherrill Mount House, also known as the Fries Hotel, Moundside Apartments, and The Inn at Sherrill, is a historic building located in Sherrill, Iowa, United States. This is one of the few surviving pre-Civil War hotels left in Iowa, and one of the largest early stone structures remaining in rural Dubuque County. The three-story building is composed of native limestone with a cupola on top of the hip roof. It was built along a stagecoach route that traveled along the Mississippi River. At one time it was situated on a 40-acre (16 ha) plot of land on which were several out buildings for an agricultural operation that included an orchard and vineyard. The building also served the community as a post office and meeting hall. Before national prohibition in 1919 the inn included a beer garden, tavern and dance hall. It was at this time that the building was converted into an apartment building. It has subsequently been converted into a bed and breakfast called the Black Horse Inn. The house was listed on the National Register of Historic Places in 2002.
