= Keystone Bridge Company =

American bridge building company

- Company type: Bridge Company
- Industry: Civil Engineering
- Founded: 1865; 161 years ago
- Headquarters: Pittsburgh, Pennsylvania
- Key people: Andrew Carnegie
- Products: bridge building construction

The Keystone Bridge Company, founded in 1865 by Andrew Carnegie, was an American bridge building company. It was one of the 28 companies absorbed into the American Bridge Company in 1900. The company advertised its services for building steel, wrought iron, wooden railway and road bridges.

It held a patent for wrought iron bridges and also supplied wrought iron columns for buildings. Thomas Carnegie worked for Keystone Bridge as treasurer for roughly 20 years, from the founding of the company until his death in 1886.

== History and architectural features ==
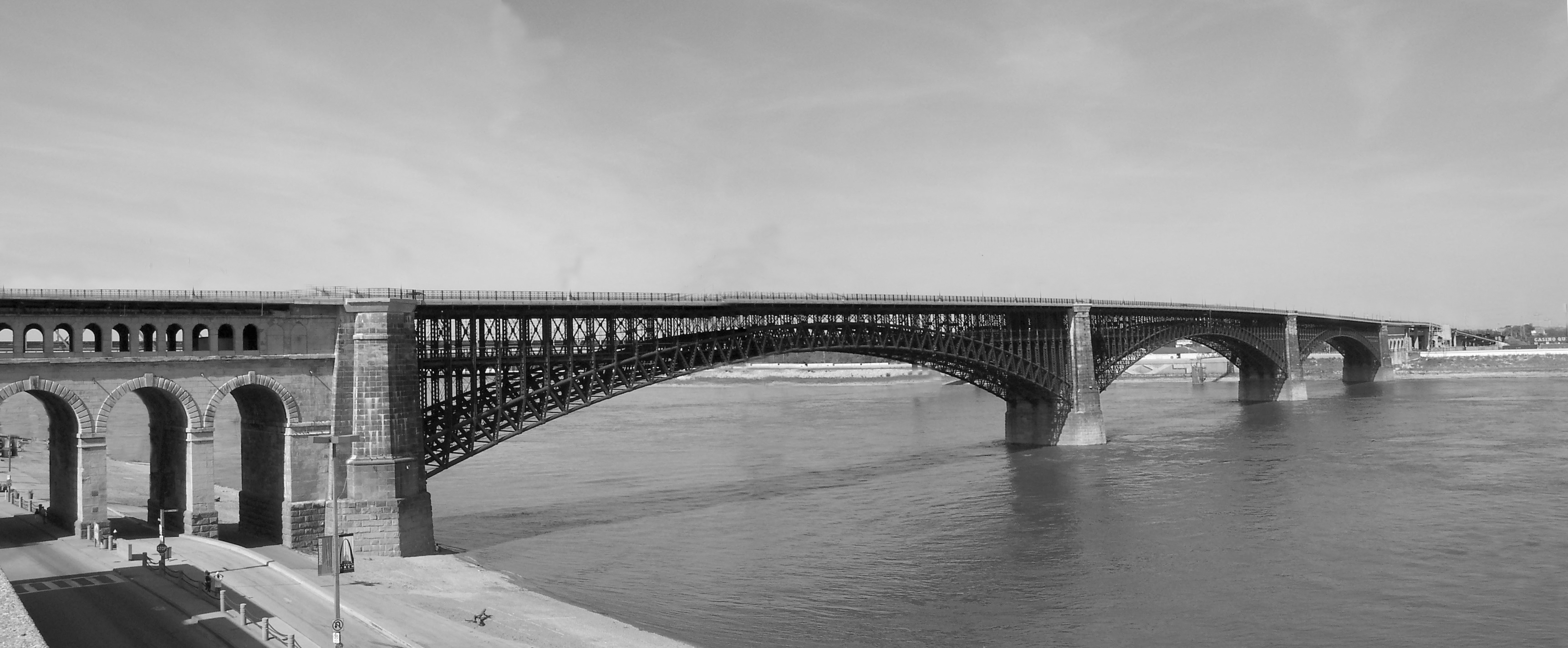
A panoramic image of Eads Bridge

Keystone is best remembered for the Eads Bridge in St. Louis, completed in 1874, which survives to this day. A number of its works are listed on the U.S. National Register of Historic Places.

Carnegie sold his company, Carnegie Steel Company to J.P. Morgan in 1901.

Works include (attribution):

- Fairground Street Bridge (built 1895), spans ICG RR yard on Fairground St. Vicksburg, MS (Keystone Bridge Co.), NRHP-listed
- Hannibal Bridge or Kansas City Bridge, spanned the Missouri River at Kansas City, MO, (constructed 1867–9) for the Hannibal & St. Joseph Railroad. (Keystone Bridge Co.).
- Nokesville Truss Bridge, NE of Nokesville on VA 646 Nokesville, VA (Keystone Bridge Co.), NRHP-listed
- Oak Ridge Railroad Overpass, SW of Shipman on VA 653 Shipman, VA (Keystone Bridge Co.), NRHP-listed
- Pine Creek Park Bridge, N of Old Dam Rd., over Pine Cr. Fairfield, CT (Keystone Bridge Co.), NRHP-listed
- Riverside Avenue Bridge, Riverside Ave. and RR tracks Greenwich, CT (Keystone Bridge Co.), NRHP-listed
- Valley Road Bridge, Stewartstown Railroad, Stewartstown RR tracks over Valley Rd., Hopewell Township Stewartstown, PA (Keystone Bridge Co.), NRHP-listed
- White Water Creek Bridge, Whitewater Rd. over White Water Cr. Bernard, IA (Keystone Bridge Co.), NRHP-listed
- Windsor Harbor Road Bridge, Windsor Harbor Rd. at Rock Creek Kimmswick, MO (Keystone Bridge Company), NRHP-listed
- Keystone Bridge, Over North Fork of the South Platte River for access to the Mountain hiking trail Bailey Co. (Keystone Bridge Company)
