= Haberkorn House and Farmstead =

Historic house in Iowa, United States

- U.S. National Register of Historic Places
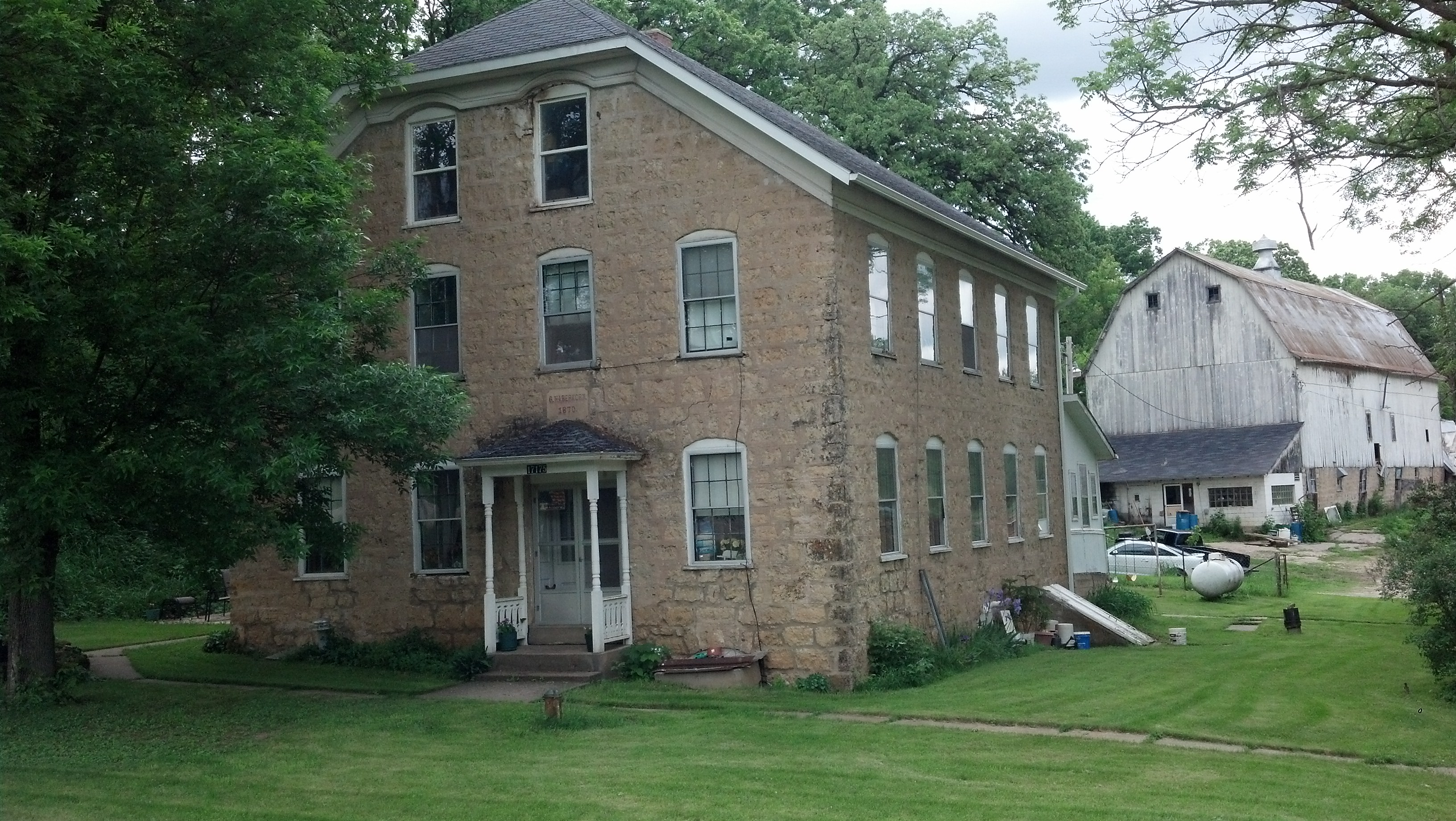

- Location within Iowa Location within the United States
- Location: West of Sherrill
- Coordinates: 42°36′24″N 90°49′21″W
- Area: 6 acres (2.4 ha)
- Built: 1870
- Built by: George & Adam Haberkorn
- NRHP reference No.: 80001449
- Added to NRHP: January 25, 1980

Haberkorn House and Farmstead is a historic farm located west of Sherrill, Iowa, United States. The farmstead features a good example of a vernacular house type that is found only in northeast Iowa within the state. Its more prominent in around the village of St. Donatus in Jackson County. The basic features of the house are rockfaced limestone construction, a jerkinhead gable roof, a rectangular plan, and two or more stories in height. This 2½-story structure differs a little in that it has a front gable rather than a side gable, and it is a little larger than the others. These houses were built by immigrants who came here from Luxembourg and southern Germany. Adam Haberkorn and his son George built this house in 1870, and were natives of Bavaria. The family operated a small brewery and the front room of this house became a local tavern, and a polling place in the late 19th century.

The farmstead also includes a barn, corn crib, granary, machine shed, grain bins, goat shed and chicken house. There is a stone oven in the bluff where Eve Haberkorn baked the bread that she sold. A brewery cellar is also located inside a natural cave in the bluff. The farm was listed on the National Register of Historic Places in 1980.
