= T. Ben Loetscher House =

Historic house in Iowa, United States

- U.S. National Register of Historic Places
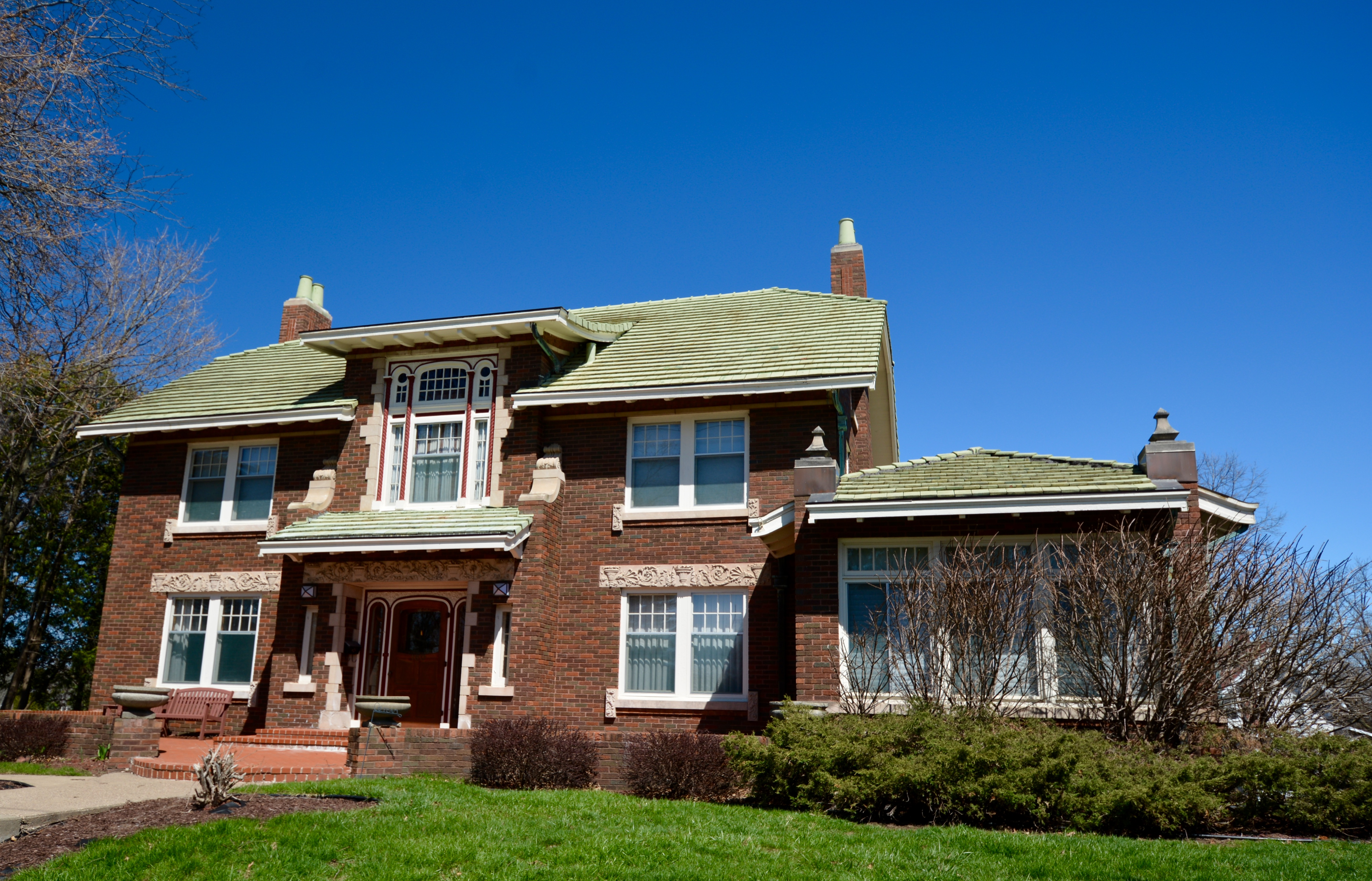

- Location within Iowa Location within the United States
- Location: 160 S. Grandview Ave. Dubuque, Iowa
- Coordinates: 42°29′23.8″N 90°41′02.5″W
- Area: less than one acre
- Built: 1929
- Architect: C.I. Krajewski
- Architectural style: Tudor Revival; Colonial Revival
- NRHP reference No.: 89001777
- Added to NRHP: November 2, 1989

The T. Ben Loetscher House is a historic building located in Dubuque, Iowa, United States. T. Ben and Nellie Loetscher had this house built in 1929. It is one of the best examples of early 20th century period revival eclecticism in the city. It was designed by Dubuque architect C.I. Krajewski. The 2½-story brick house features a main entrance with sidelights and other windows that reaches the attic level. It features a blend of wood carvings in foliate and rope designs, and Bedford stone lintels and blocks that are carved with reliefs that reflect an Italian Renaissance influence. The brick color, chimneys and roof style reflect the Tudor Revival style. The house also has large windows with transom and casements that reflect the Colonial Revival style. A single-story brick addition is located on its southeast side blends into the rest of the house. The house was listed on the National Register of Historic Places in 1989.
