= Seminary Hill Residential Historic District =

Historic district in Iowa, United States

- U.S. National Register of Historic Places
- U.S. Historic district
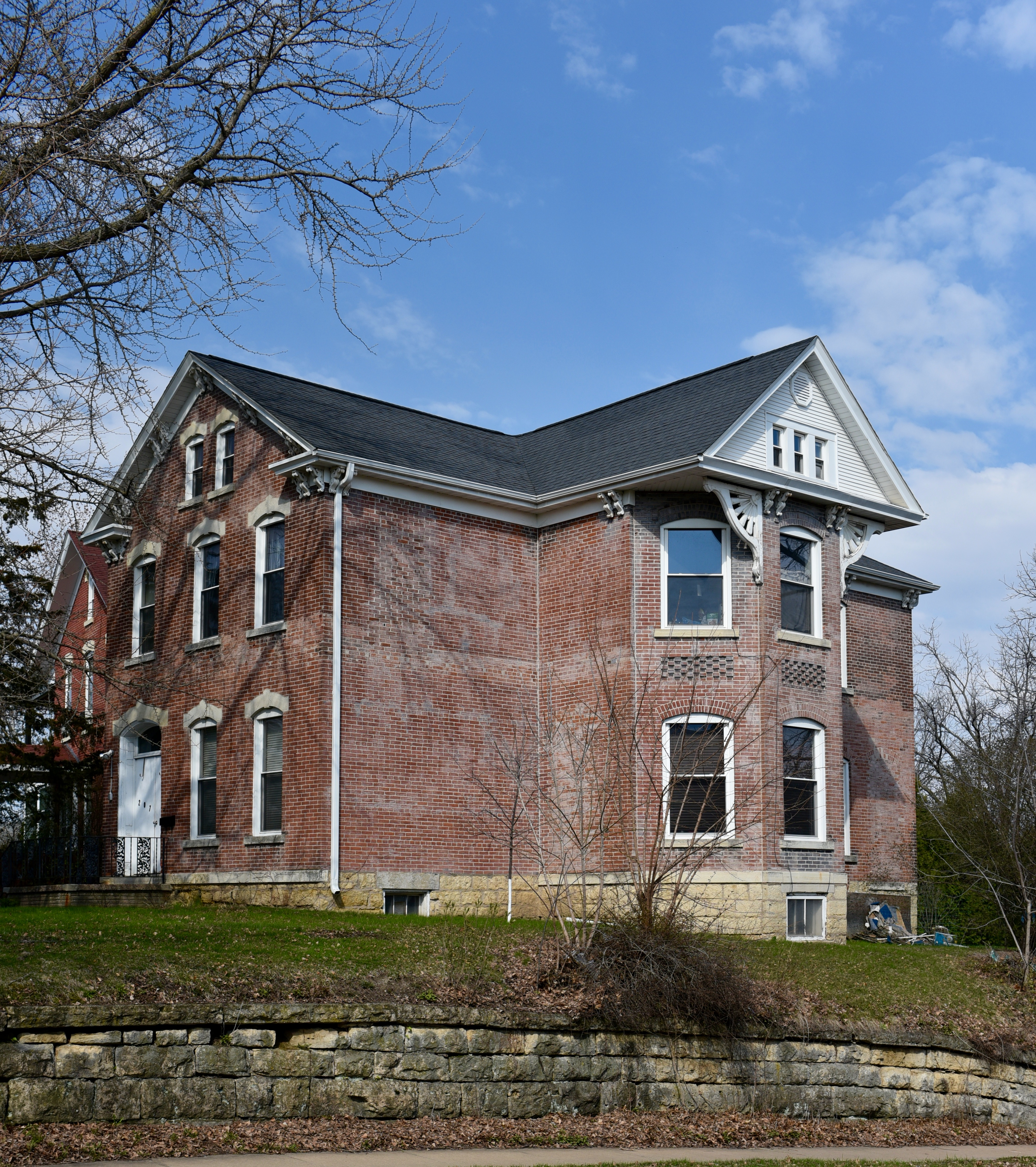
- 206 Clark Drive (c.1883-85)

- Location within Iowa Location within the United States
- Location: Clarke Dr., N. Main & Madison Sts., Madison Park, Dubuque, Iowa
- Coordinates: 42°30′33″N 90°40′19″W
- Area: 13.27 acres (5.37 ha)
- MPS: Dubuque, Iowa, MPS
- NRHP reference No.: 15000723
- Added to NRHP: October 13, 2015

The Seminary Hill Residential Historic District is a nationally recognized historic district located in Dubuque, Iowa, United States. It was listed on the National Register of Historic Places in 2015. At the time of its nomination it consisted of 55 resources, which included 38 contributing buildings, one contributing site, one contributing object, 13 non-contributing buildings, one non-contributing structure, and one non-contributing object. The district is a blufftop residential area that surrounds Madison Park. It takes its name from its proximity to the former German Theological Seminary, now the seminary located at the University of Dubuque. Clarke Drive, the main artery through the district, was also known as Seminary Street at one time. About half of the historic buildings here are brick. The Italianate style is dominate, with several examples of the Italian Villa design. There are also a few examples of the Second Empire, Queen Anne, and Classical Revival styles. This residential area was developed between 1855 and 1919.
