= John Bell Block =

- U.S. National Register of Historic Places
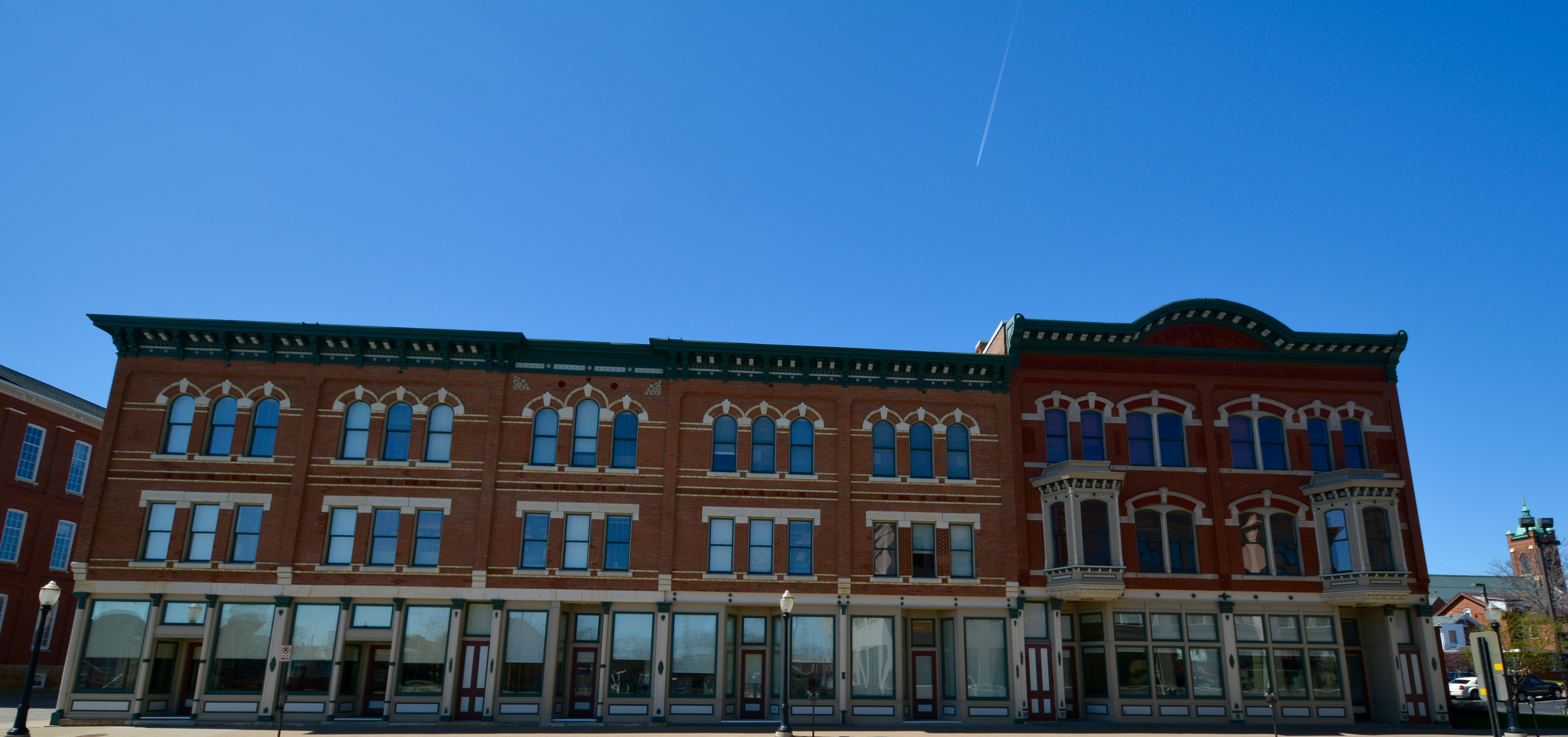
- The John Bell Block is on the left and the Ziepprecht Block is on the right.

- Location within Iowa Location within the United States
- Location: 1301-07 Central Ave. Dubuque, Iowa
- Coordinates: 42°30′20.4″N 90°40′03.5″W
- Area: less than one acre
- Built: 1886-1887
- Architectural style: Italianate
- NRHP reference No.: 02001540
- Added to NRHP: December 20, 2002

The John Bell Block, also known as the German Bank & Trust Building, is a historic building located in Dubuque, Iowa, United States. The three-story brick commercial Italianate building was constructed by local businessman John Bell in 1886. Its location on the north side of the central business district meant that it housed several businesses owned by the city's German immigrant population. Chief among them was the German Trust and Savings Bank. It became a tenant when the building was completed and it remained until it built its own building in 1922. In 1918 anti-German sentiments that resulted from World War I forced the bank to change its name to Union Trust and Savings Bank. It remained in operation until 1932 when a run on its deposits as a result of the Great Depression forced it to fail. Its building was taken over by Dubuque Bank and Trust. Three prominent Dubuque professionals also had offices on the second floor of the building. German-born architect Martin Heer had offices beginning in 1888. He partnered with another German-born architect, Guido Beck, from 1889 to 1895. Beck was noted for his commercial blocks and churches. Contractor Anton Zwack had offices here from 1911 to c. 1965. The building was listed on the National Register of Historic Places in 2002.

An early tenant was Baumgartner and Kleih Hardware store
