= Washington Street and East 22nd Street Historic District =

Historic district in Iowa, United States

- U.S. National Register of Historic Places
- U.S. Historic district
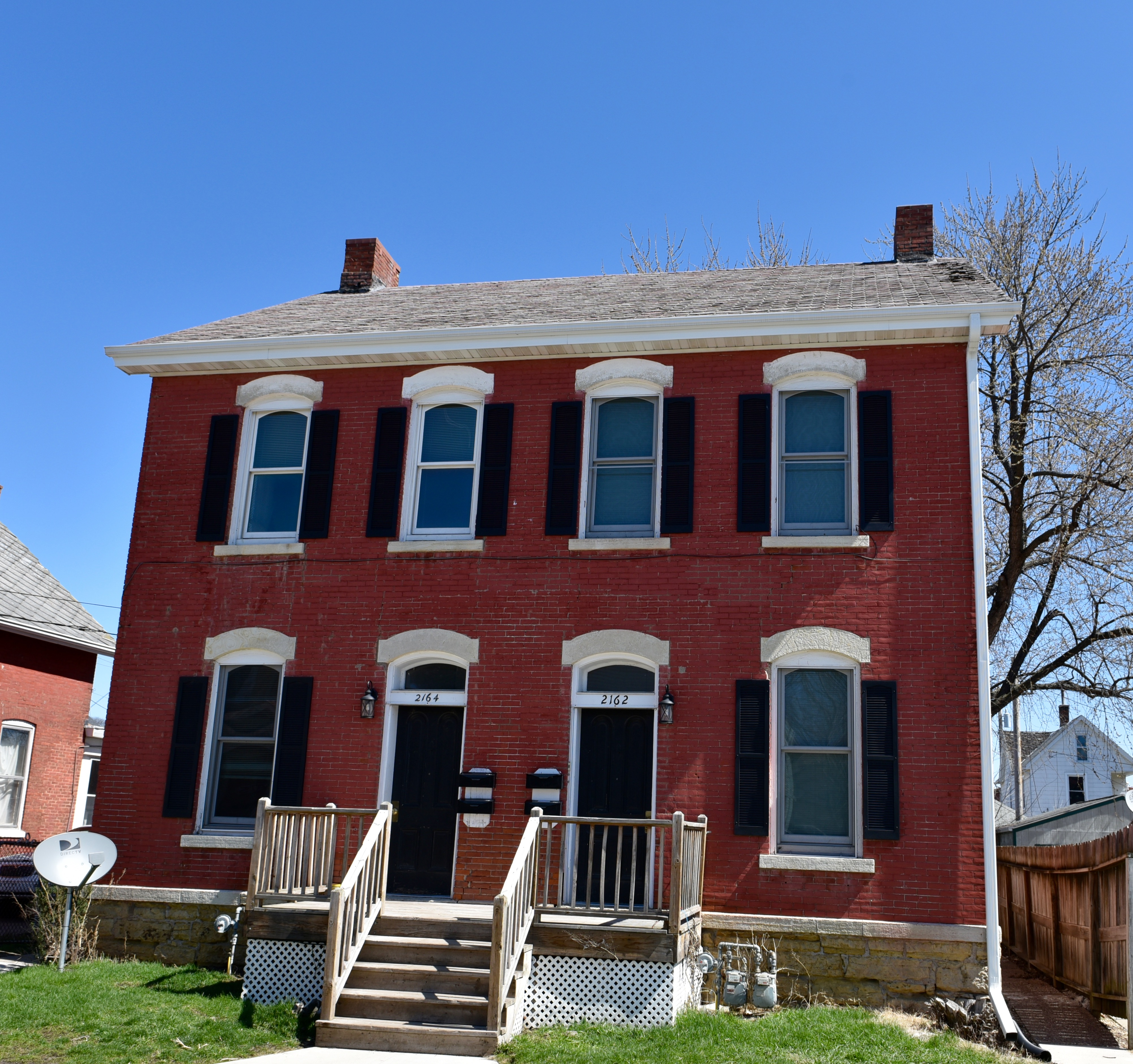
- 2162-2164 Washington St. (1883)

- Location within Iowa Location within the United States
- Location: 2162-2255 Washington St. and E. 22nd St., Dubuque, Iowa
- Coordinates: 42°30′52″N 90°40′08″W
- Area: 3.34 acres (1.35 ha)
- Architect: Late Victorian; Classical Revival
- MPS: Dubuque, Iowa MPS
- NRHP reference No.: 11000052
- Added to NRHP: February 28, 2011

Washington Street and East 22nd Street Historic District is a nationally recognized historic district located in Dubuque, Iowa, United States. It was listed on the National Register of Historic Places in 2015. At the time of its nomination it consisted of 34 resources, which included 29 contributing buildings, and five non-contributing buildings. The focus of this district is a cluster of brick buildings around the intersection of Washington and East 22nd Streets on the north side of Dubuque. Its location west of the former Chicago Great Western Railway and the Chicago, Milwaukee, St. Paul and Pacific Railroad yards led to a large percentage of the residents here to be higher ranking railroad employees. The historic buildings are brick and frame houses, with the exception of one brick storefront/residence. Most of the houses are front or side gabled vernacular structures, and a few that are Italianate or Classical Revival. Couler Creek, which was located behind the houses on the east side of Washington Street, also affected the development of this area. There is no alley behind the houses on the east side of Washington. Flooding was also a major problem in this area until the creek was covered in a stone-arched sewer and continues to flow under ground.
