= Upper Iowa Street Historic District =

Historic district in Iowa, United States

- U.S. National Register of Historic Places
- U.S. Historic district
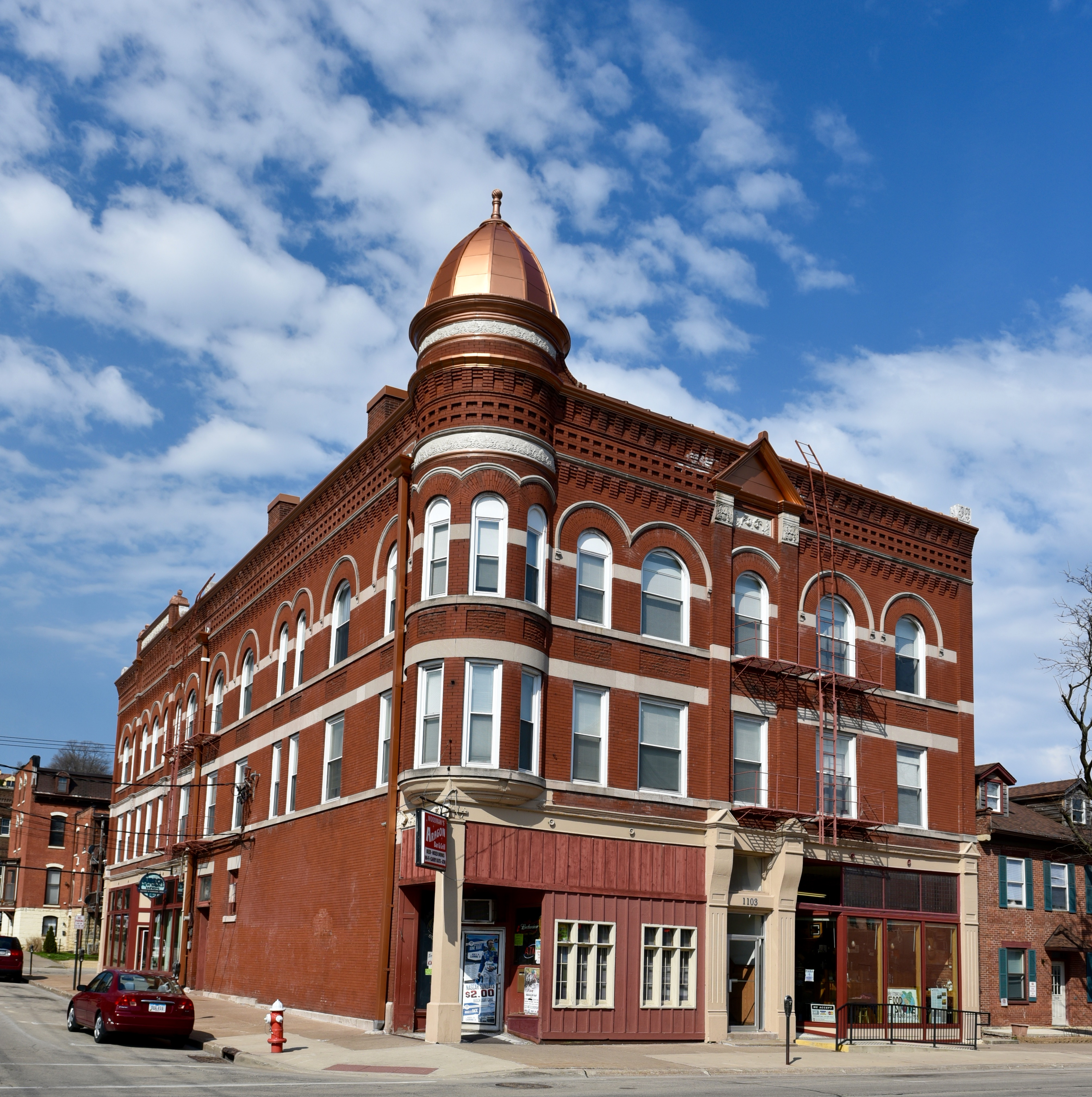
- 1101-1103 Iowa Street (1893)

- Location within Iowa Location within the United States
- Location: Iowa St. between W. 11th & 12th Sts., Dubuque, Iowa
- Coordinates: 42°30′33″N 90°40′19″W
- Area: less than one acre
- MPS: Dubuque, Iowa, MPS
- NRHP reference No.: 15000724
- Added to NRHP: October 13, 2015

The Upper Iowa Street Historic District is a nationally recognized historic district located in Dubuque, Iowa, United States. It was listed on the National Register of Historic Places in 2015. At the time of its nomination it consisted of nine resources, which included eight contributing buildings and one non-contributing building. The district is a single block with commercial and residential buildings on both sides of Iowa Street. It was originally a residential section on the north side of the central business district. The first two commercial buildings were substantial Italianate-style structures constructed on the north side of the block in the mid-1880s. In the 1890s larger and more elaborate Queen Anne commercial buildings were built to the south. The oldest building is an 1872 residence that was used as a doctor's office and other business purposes. It has subsequently been covered in Permastone. The rest of the buildings are brick with stone ornamentation.
