= Metz Manufacturing Company =

- U.S. National Register of Historic Places
- Location within Iowa Location within the United States
- Location: 1690 Elm St. Dubuque, Iowa
- Coordinates: 42°30′35.3″N 90°39′53″W
- NRHP reference No.: 100006658
- Added to NRHP: June 21, 2021

The Metz Manufacturing Company is a historic building in Dubuque, Iowa, United States. The company was established as Hagge and Metz by John Hagge and Louis Metz in 1898. They were a planing mill that produced sashes, doors, blinds, frames, moldings, and stair work for large private and public buildings. The company name was changed to Metz Manufacturing in 1902. The following year they moved to this building. The three-story brick structure built over a raised stone basement was constructed sometime before 1900. It was acquired by Metx LLC in 2017 and renovated into an office building with the first tenant moving in during 2019. The building was listed on the National Register of Historic Places in 2021.
