= John and Marie (Palen) Schrup Farmstead Historic District =

Historic district in Iowa, United States

- U.S. National Register of Historic Places
- U.S. Historic district
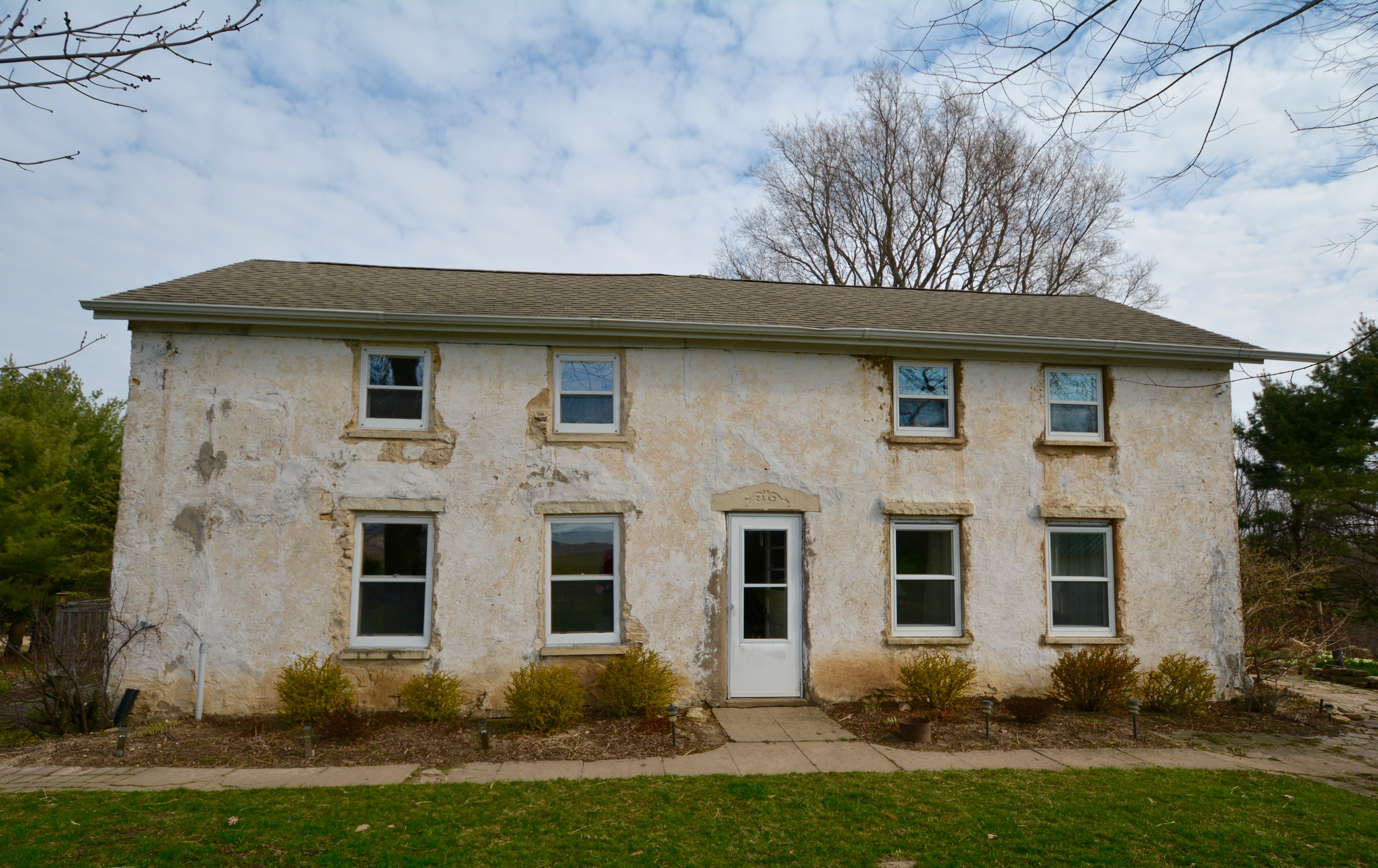
- The Schrup House (c. 1854)

- Location within Iowa Location within the United States
- Location: 10086 Lake Eleanor Rd. Dubuque, Iowa
- Coordinates: 42°26′37″N 90°39′27″W
- Area: 3 acres (1.2 ha)
- Built: c. 1854, 1860
- Built by: John Kelley
- NRHP reference No.: 09000713
- Added to NRHP: September 16, 2009

The John and Marie (Palen) Schrup Farmstead Historic District is a nationally recognized historic district in Dubuque County, Iowa, United States. It was listed on the National Register of Historic Places in 2009. At the time of its nomination it consisted of four resources, which included three contributing buildings and one non-contributing building. The three buildings include a stone house (c. 1854), barn (c. 1860), and well-house (c. 1860). The buildings are typical of those constructed by immigrant families from Luxembourg that settled in Dubuque and nearby Jackson counties. The front part of the house is the oldest structure here and was built when Martin Burkhart owned the property. He sold the farmstead to Casper Burkhart the following year, who then sold it to John and Marie Schrup in 1856. The Schrups were responsible for adding onto the back of the house about the time they bought it and the other two buildings. The dairy farm of 193 acres (78 ha) remained in the family until 1973. Because it was always a modest enterprise, the stone buildings were not torn down and replaced with modern structures as happened on many of the Luxembourgian farms built in the mid-19th century. A wooden shed was built in the early 20th century, and is the non-contributing building. A pole barn was also added to the farmstead and it fell down c. 1995.
