= Four Mounds site =

- Four Mounds Site
- U.S. National Register of Historic Places
- U.S. Historic district – Contributing property
- Location: Address restricted
- Part of: Four Mounds Estate Historic District (ID01001487)
- NRHP reference No.: 00001076
- Added to NRHP: November 17, 2000

The Four Mounds Site is a historic site located in Dubuque, Iowa, United States. It is made up of a row of four conical burial mounds on a blufftop that overlooks the Mississippi River. They are prehistoric in their origin. The site was individually listed on the National Register of Historic Places in 2000. It was included as a contributing property in the Four Mounds Estate Historic District in 2002.
