= Upper Central Avenue Commercial Historic District =

Historic district in Iowa, United States

- Upper Central Avenue Historic District
- U.S. National Register of Historic Places
- U.S. Historic district
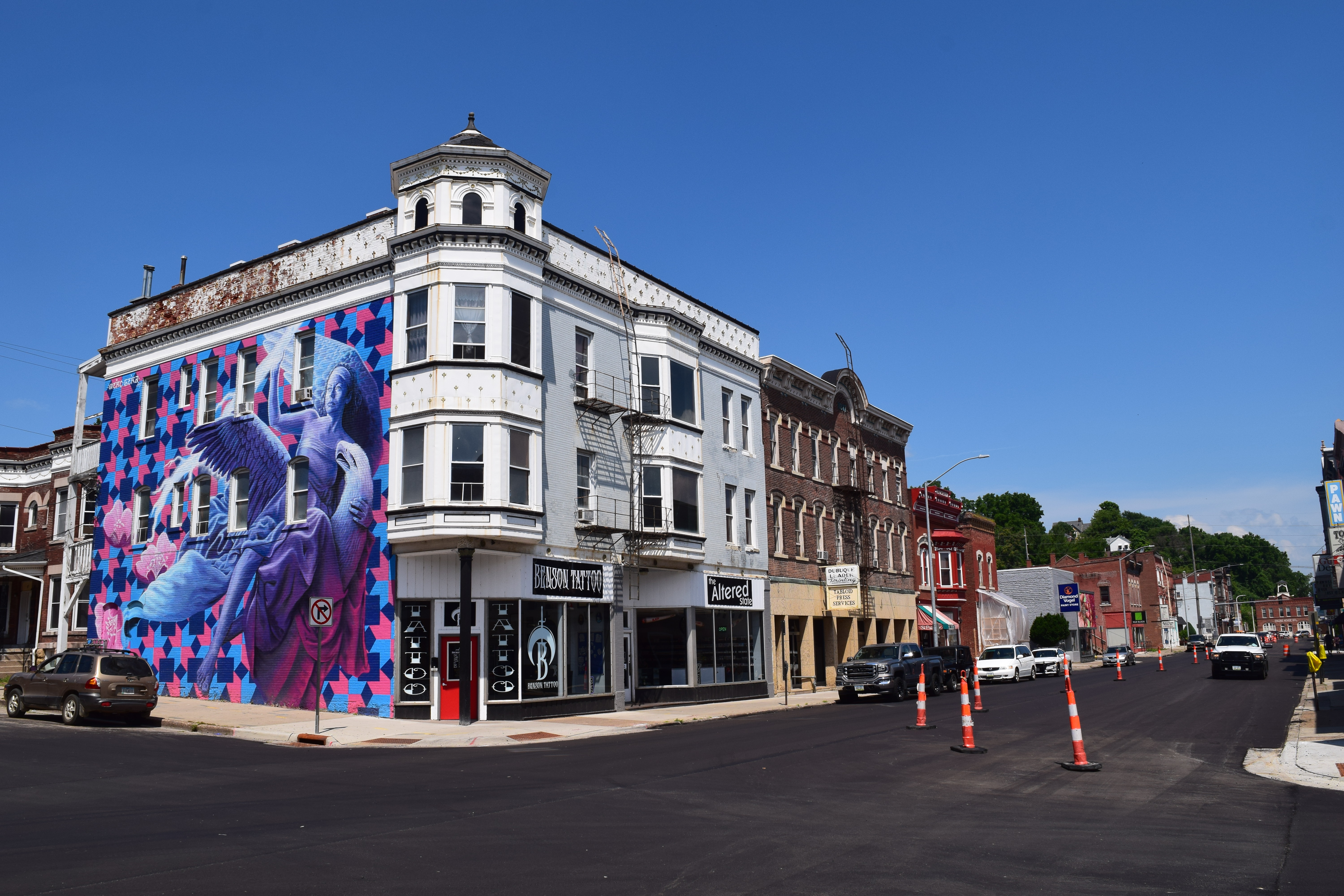
- West side of the 1500 block of Central Avenue

- Location within Iowa Location within the United States
- Location: 1460-1965 Central Ave., Dubuque, Iowa
- Coordinates: 42°30′32″N 90°40′09″W
- Area: 10.81 acres (4.37 ha)
- Architectural style: Late Victorian; Early Commercial
- MPS: Dubuque, Iowa, MPS
- NRHP reference No.: 12000793
- Added to NRHP: September 19, 2012

The Upper Central Avenue Historic District is a nationally recognized historic district located in Dubuque, Iowa, United States. It was listed on the National Register of Historic Places in 2012. At the time of its nomination it consisted of 65 resources, which included 56 contributing buildings, one contributing site and eight non-contributing buildings. This six block section of Central Avenue is located on the north side of the central business district. The largely linear district includes a jog at 18th Street. Below the jog the street was originally named Clay Street and above it Couler Avenue. It was also the dividing line where all commerce used the German language exclusively to the north. At one time the street featured a streetcar route and it was a significant farm-to-market route and a gateway into the city from the north.

The period of significance for the district covers the years 1856 to 1919, but its historic commercial development occurred during the 1870s and 1880s. The buildings were constructed in brick and are largely two to three stories tall. There are also several single-story buildings and one that is four stories tall. The Italianate and the Queen Anne are dominant. Nine of the buildings are major commercial blocks. In addition to the commercial buildings, there is the two-story, brick, former Fire Engine House Number 1 that faces south at the jog in the street. The buildings in the district are considered some of the best examples of late-19th-century commercial designs in the city.

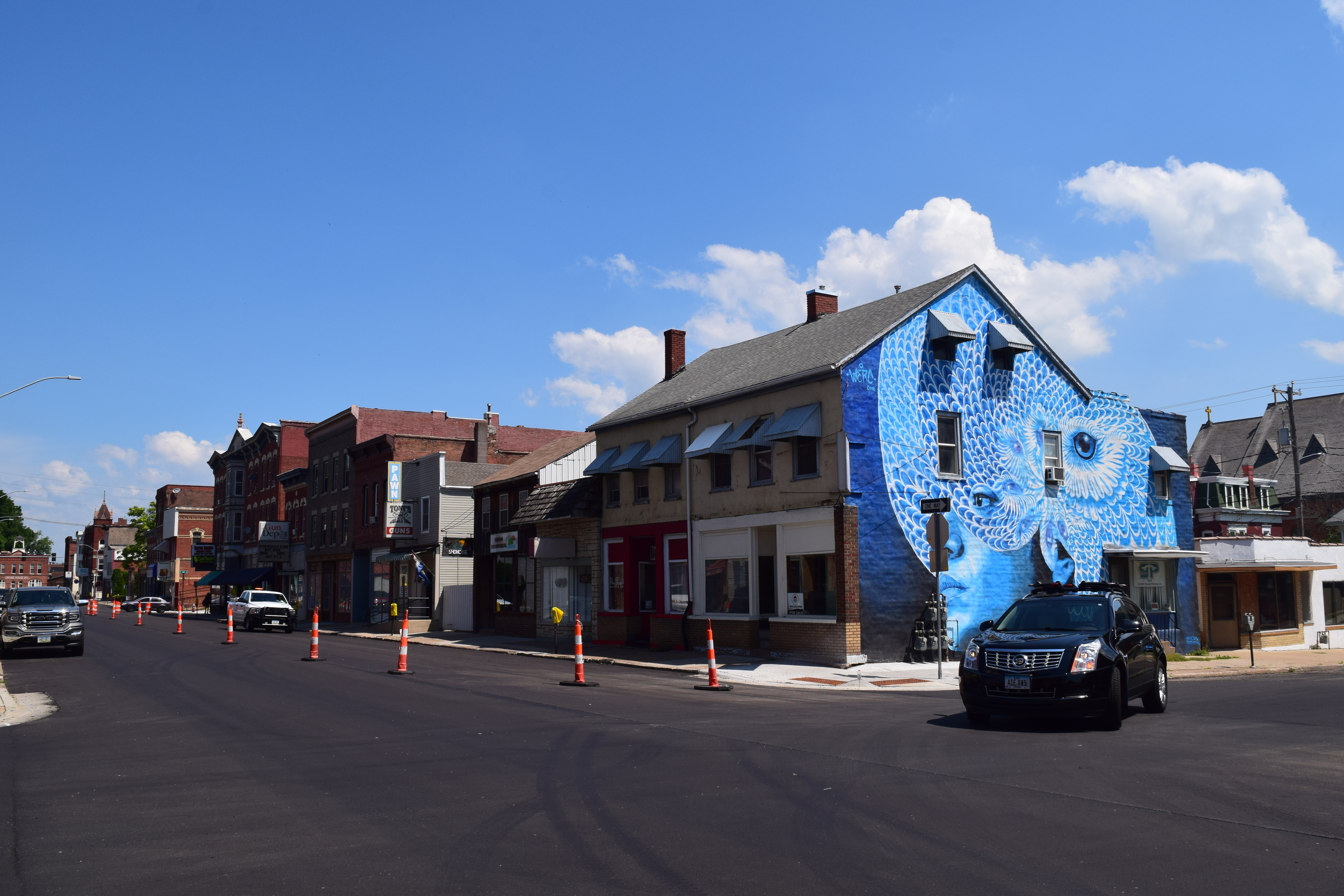
East side of the 1500 block of Central Avenue
