= Ziepprecht Block =

Historic building in Dubuque, Iowa, United States

- U.S. National Register of Historic Places
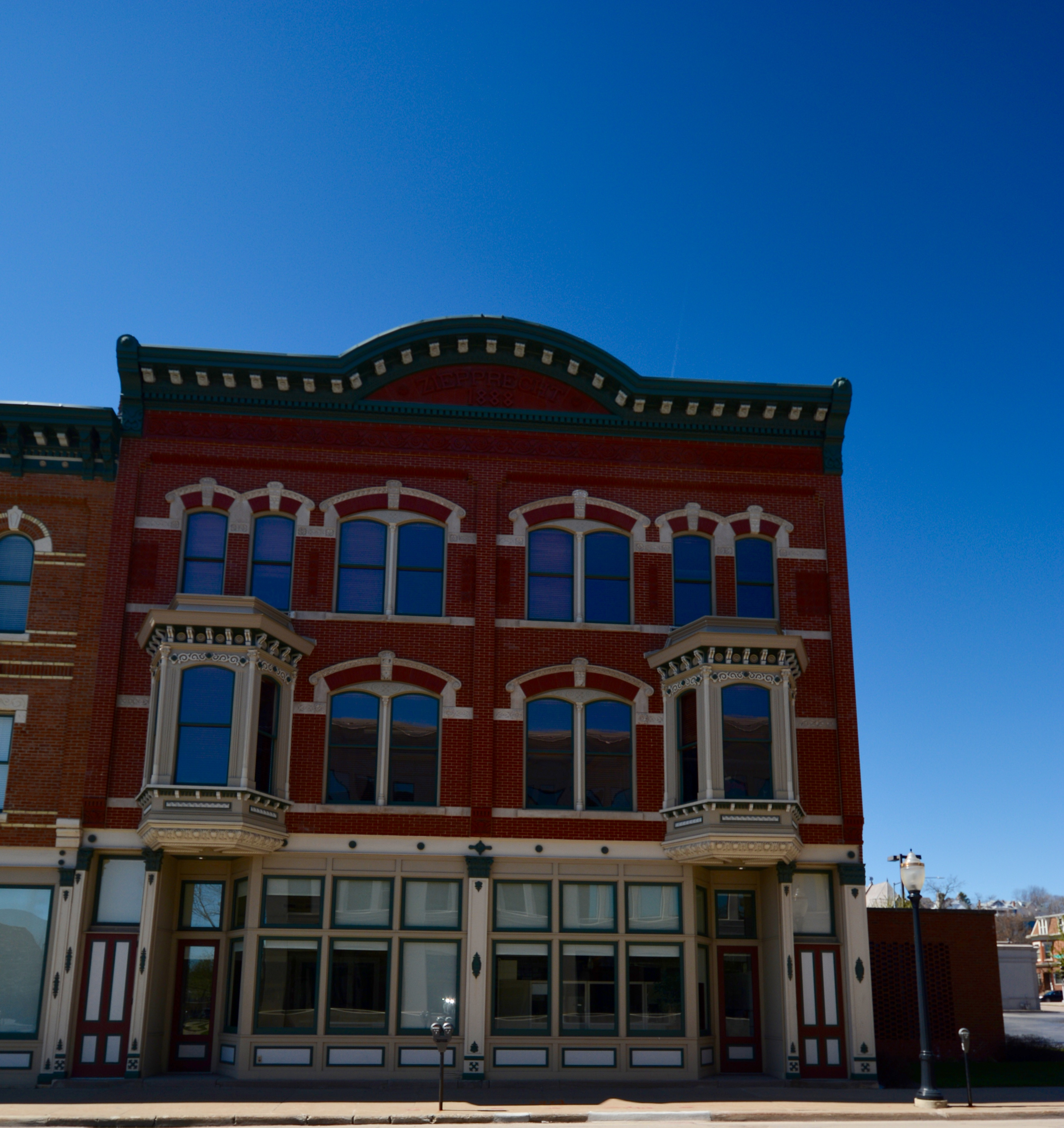

- Location within Iowa Location within the United States
- Location: 1347-53 Central Ave. Dubuque, Iowa
- Coordinates: 42°30′21.2″N 90°40′03.8″W
- Area: less than one acre
- Built: 1888
- Architect: Freeman, Hart & Co.
- Architectural style: Italianate
- NRHP reference No.: 02001541
- Added to NRHP: December 20, 2002

The Ziepprecht Block is a historic building located in Dubuque, Iowa, United States. Completed in 1888, it is a fine example of transitional commercial Italianate architecture. The three-story brick structure features a heavy projecting cornice and rounded pediment from the Italianate, with larger paired windows from the Second Empire style, and three-sided bay windows from the Queen Anne style. It is also one of a small number of double storefront blocks that remain in the downtown area. The building is named for Henry Ziepprecht a German-born druggist who settled in Dubuque in 1856 and died in 1887. His estate paid to have this building constructed on the location of an older building that housed his drug store. Now managed by Joseph Wittmer, the drug store and a confectionery were the first businesses to occupy the storefronts. The upper floors housed apartments. The building was listed on the National Register of Historic Places in 2002.
