= Zephaniah Kidder House =

Historic house in Iowa, United States

- U.S. National Register of Historic Places
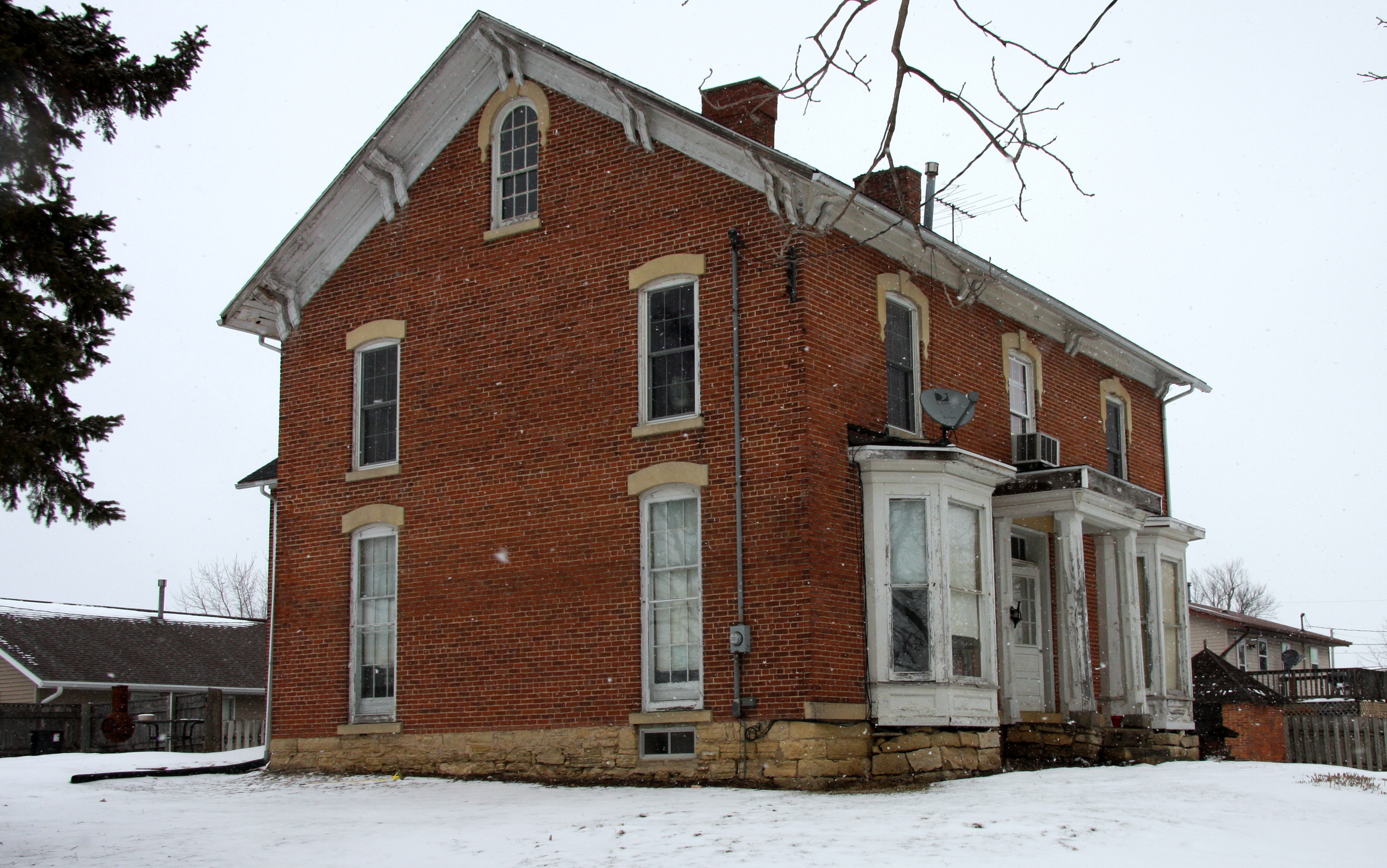

- Location within Iowa Location within the United States
- Location: 206 First Ave., N.E. Epworth, Iowa
- Coordinates: 42°26′47″N 90°55′44.4″W
- Area: less than one acre
- Built: 1868
- Built by: Zephaniah Kidder
- NRHP reference No.: 78001218
- Added to NRHP: November 14, 1978

The Zephaniah Kidder House is a historic building located in Epworth, Iowa, United States. A Maine native, Kidder settled in Iowa in 1853 after spending time in California. He was one of three men who established the town of Epworth on their land holdings in 1855. Kidder was also instrumental in founding the Epworth Seminary, and was involved in a variety of business ventures. Kidder was involved in the construction of this house, completed in 1868. It is a 2½-story structure built of locally produced brick. The house features a symmetrical plan, side gable roof, bracketed eaves, and two interior brick chimneys. The main facade is three bays wide, with protruding bay windows on the first floor, and the main entrance has sidelights and transom that is covered by a flat-roofed porch. The second floor has windows with keystone drip moldings. The house was listed on the National Register of Historic Places in 1978.
