= Old Chapel Hall =

- U.S. National Register of Historic Places
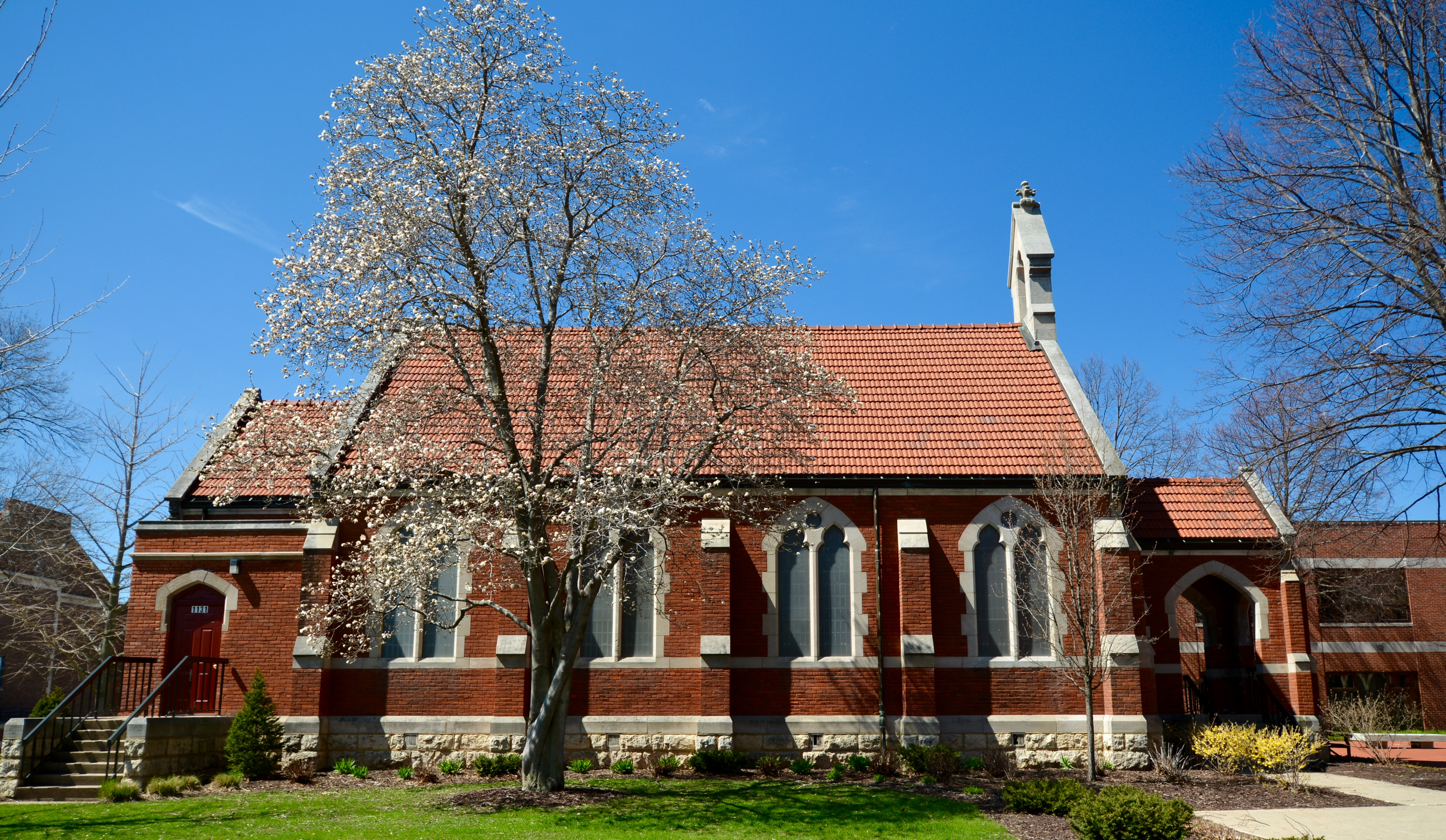

- Location within Iowa Location within the United States
- Location: 2050 University Ave. Dubuque, Iowa
- Coordinates: 42°29′53.7″N 90°41′35″W
- Area: less than one acre
- Built: 1907
- NRHP reference No.: 83000355
- Added to NRHP: August 5, 1983

Old Chapel Hall, also known as Alumni Hall, is a historic building located on the campus of the University of Dubuque in Dubuque, Iowa, United States. The school started as a German Presbyterian Seminary in 1852. A period of expansion between 1904 and 1922 saw the institution become a liberal arts college called the Dubuque German College and Seminary. This building was part of that expansion. Steffens Hall (no longer extant) was completed in 1907, and became the first building on the school's new campus. The chapel was added onto the rear of that building later the same year. It was a gift of the Frank Peters family from St. Louis. The red brick Gothic Revival structure features stone trim, paired lancet windows, a rose window, and a small open bell tower above the entrance. Religious services were held here until 1980 when Blades Chapel was completed. As part of that project Steffens Hall was torn down, except for the front arcade and porch, which makes the old chapel the oldest building on campus. A courtyard was created where the old building stood directly in front of the old chapel. The building was listed on the National Register of Historic Places in 1983.
