= Garland House (Dubuque, Iowa) =

Historic house in Iowa, United States

- U.S. National Register of Historic Places
- U.S. Historic district – Contributing property
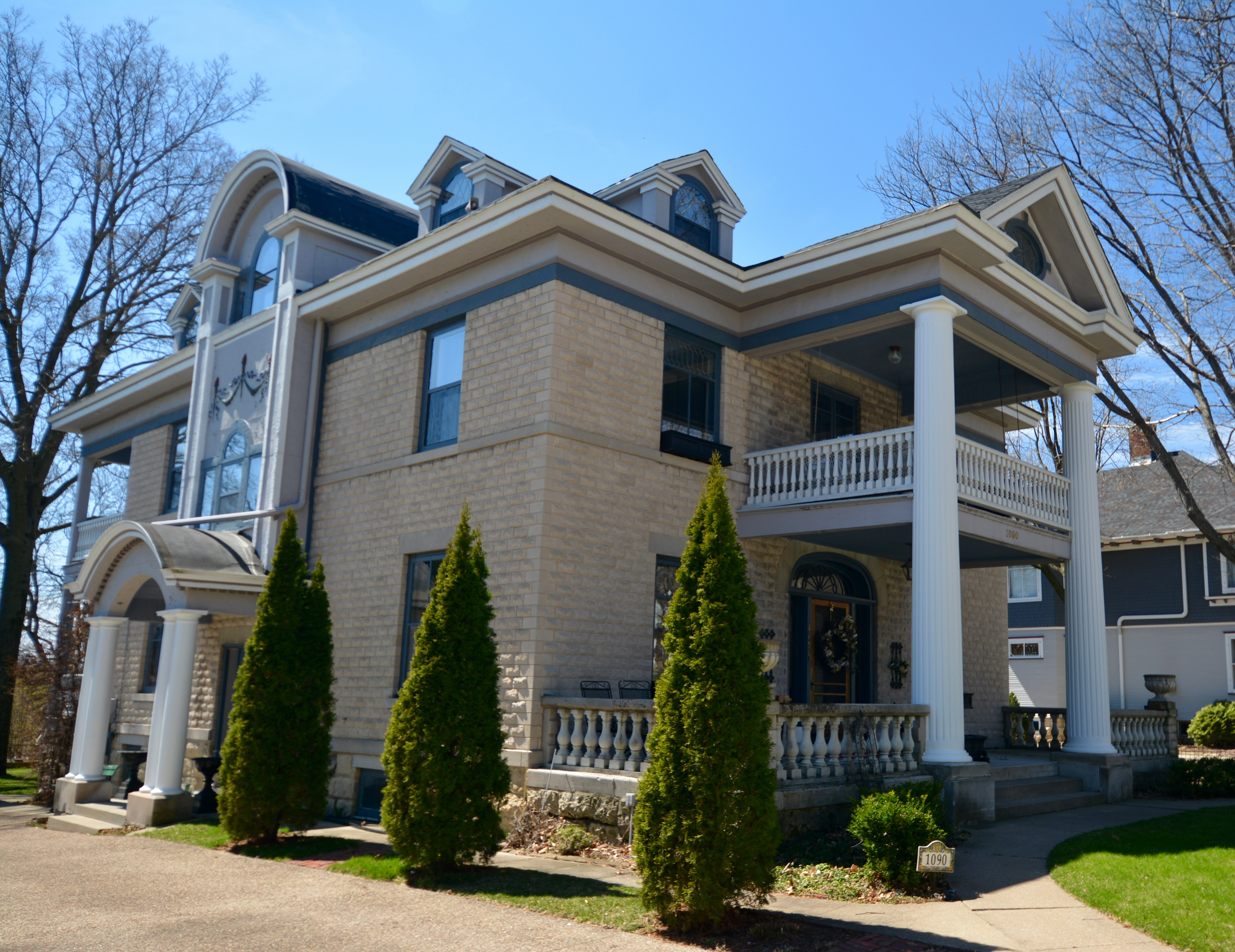

- Location within Iowa Location within the United States
- Location: 1090 Langworthy Ave. Dubuque, Iowa
- Coordinates: 42°29′36.8″N 90°40′40.6″W
- Area: less than one acre
- Built: 1907
- Architectural style: Colonial Revival
- Part of: Langworthy Historic District (ID86002102)
- NRHP reference No.: 83000353
- Added to NRHP: July 7, 1983

The Garland House is a historic building located in Dubuque, Iowa, United States. Joseph C. Garland settled in Dubuque in 1889 and built a general insurance agency that grew to cover 25 counties in Iowa representing the Northwestern Mutual Life Insurance Company. He was also a community booster and philanthropist. The exterior of his large Georgian Revival home is covered with concrete block veneer, which is an unusual combination. The main facade is dominated by a two-story pedimented portico, the east elevation by a centered semicircular vault dormer, and the rear elevation by a two-story veranda. The house is capped with a hip roof with dormers. It was individually listed on the National Register of Historic Places in 1983, and it was included as a contributing property in the Langworthy Historic District in 2004.
