= Sauser–Lane House =

Historic house in Iowa, United States

- U.S. National Register of Historic Places
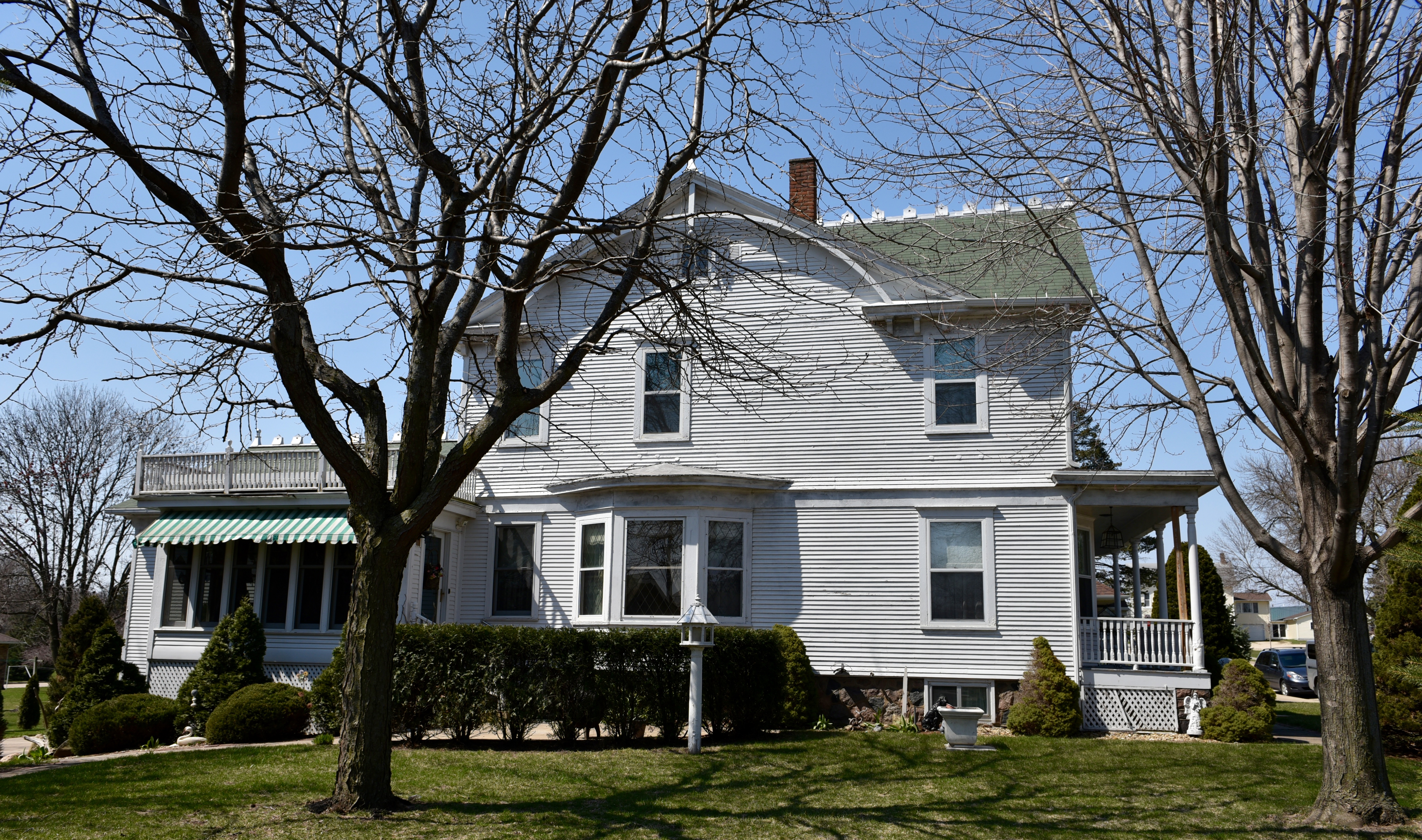

- Location within Iowa Location within the United States
- Location: 101 2nd Ave., SW. Cascade, Iowa
- Coordinates: 42°17′52.5″N 91°00′44.5″W
- Area: less than one acre
- Built: 1908
- Built by: Michael H. Sauser
- Architect: Jacob H. Daverman and Son
- Architectural style: Classical Revival; Queen Anne
- NRHP reference No.: 83000354
- Added to NRHP: July 14, 1983

The Sauser–Lane House is a historic building located in Cascade, Iowa, United States. Michael H. Sauser had been an area farmer and owned a Cascade lumber business when he built this house in 1908. It is the only known example of the Grand Rapids, Michigan mail order architectural firm of Jacob H. Daverman and Son in Iowa. Sauser lived here until his death, and it was bought by John Thomas Lane in 1926. As of 1983 it was still owned by his descendants. The 2½-story frame house is a combination of Neoclassical and a restrained version of the Queen Anne style known as Edwardian. The Edwardian influence is found in its asymmetrical massing, roof lines, bay windows, wraparound porch, gable ornamentation, roof cresting, and the leaded glass in the upper sash of the front windows. The Neoclassical influence is found in the window trim, cornice returns, and the Doric porch columns. The house was listed on the National Register of Historic Places in 1983.
