= Langworthy Historic District =

Historic district in Iowa, United States

- U.S. National Register of Historic Places
- U.S. Historic district
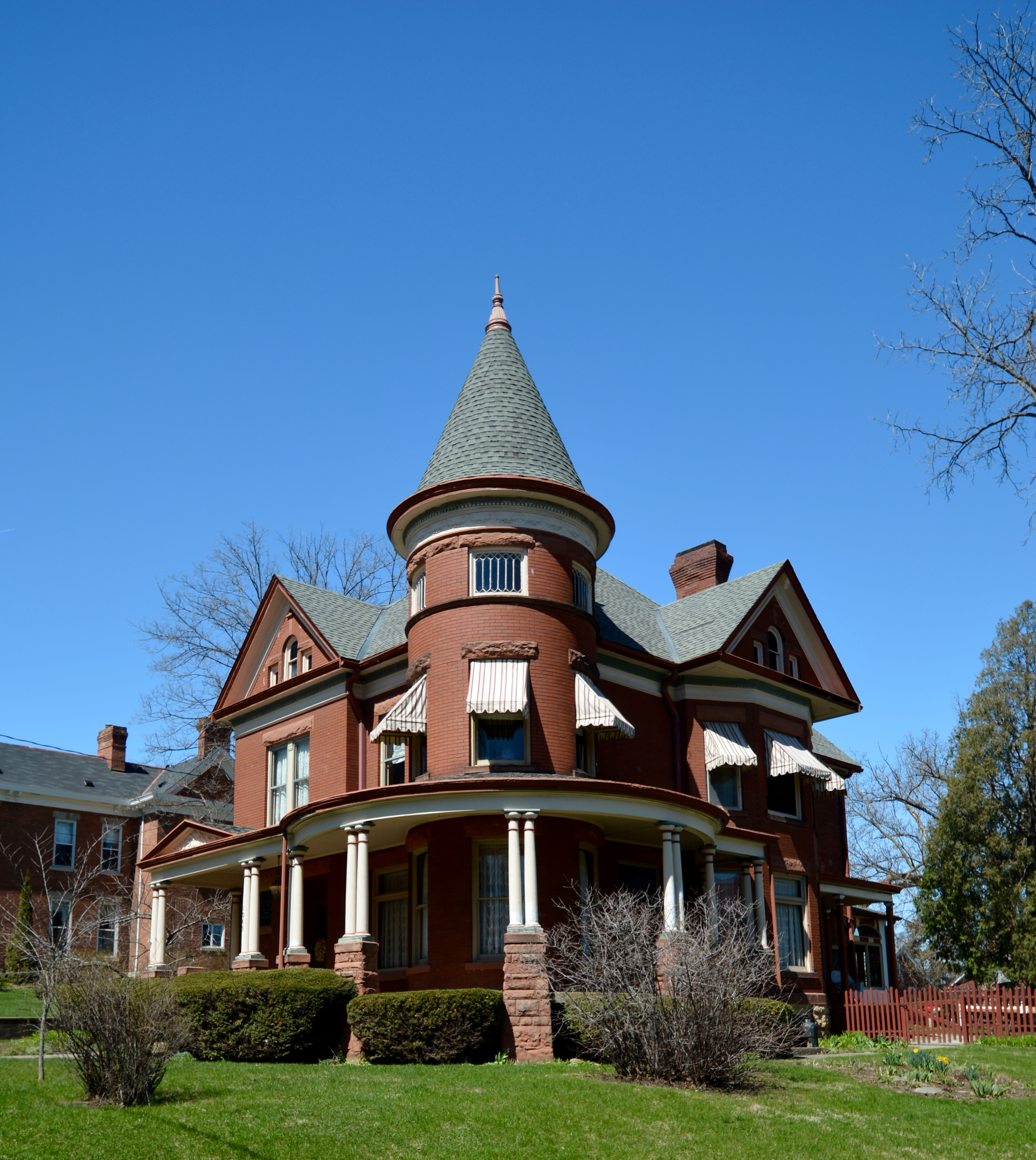
- 1045 W. 3rd St. (1896)

- Location within Iowa Location within the United States
- Location: Langworthy, W. 3rd, Melrose Terrace, Hill and W. 5th, Alpine and Walnut between Solon and W. 5th, Dubuque, Iowa
- Coordinates: 42°29′42″N 90°40′40″W
- Area: 19.49 acres (7.89 ha)
- Architectural style: Greek Revival; Octagon Mode
- MPS: Dubuque, Iowa MPS
- NRHP reference No.: 04000813
- Added to NRHP: August 12, 2004

Langworthy Historic District is a nationally recognized historic district located in Dubuque, Iowa, United States. It was listed on the National Register of Historic Places in 2004. At the time of its nomination it consisted of 110 resources, which included 94 contributing buildings, five contributing structures, nine non-contributing buildings, and two non-contributing structures. This residential area was developed from the end of the American Civil War to the beginning of World War I. Most of the houses were built between 1890 and 1910, with four large houses pre-dating the Civil War. For the most part, the houses here are larger in scale and include examples of Victorian and the various revival and American Movement styles from the late 19th and 20th centuries. The district is completely residential with no commercial or institutional buildings, and with only one multi-family house, a duplex. Two houses were individually listed on the National Register: Langworthy House, an Octagon house from 1855, and the Garland House (1907). The district derives its name from the Langworthy family who were early settlers in Dubuque and played a prominent role in the development of the local lead mining industry and the city itself. Three of the brothers built houses here.
