= Schroeder-Klein Grocery Company Warehouse =

- U.S. National Register of Historic Places
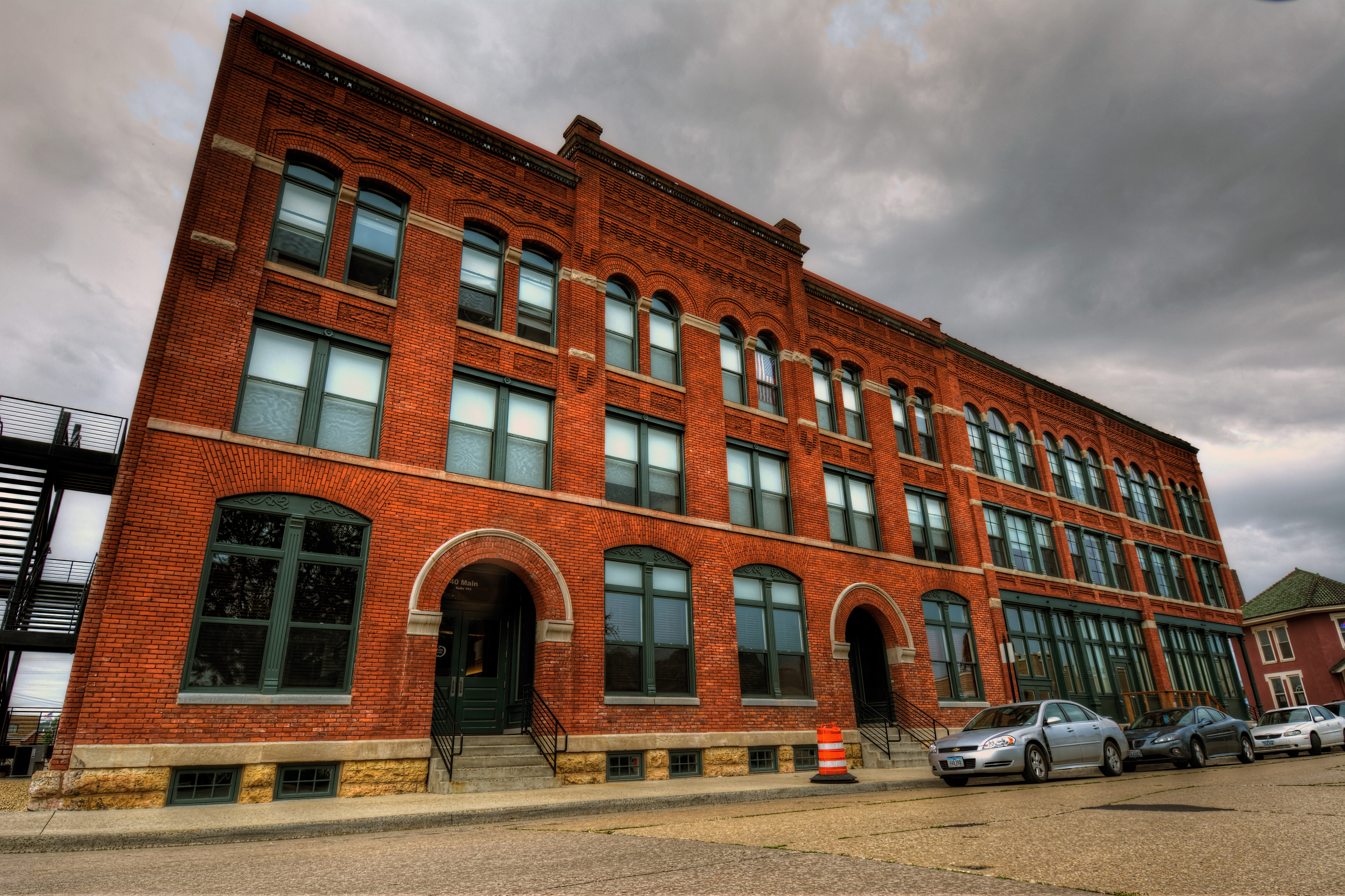

- Location within Iowa Location within the United States
- Location: 40-48 Main St. Dubuque, Iowa
- Coordinates: 42°29′37.3″N 90°39′46.7″W
- Area: less than one acre
- Built: 1894
- Built by: J.H. Shields; W.L. Bradley
- Architectural style: Romanesque
- MPS: Dubuque, Iowa MPS
- NRHP reference No.: 11000051
- Added to NRHP: February 28, 2011

Schroeder-Klein Grocery Company Warehouse, also known as the Shields & Bradley Block, is a historic building located in Dubuque, Iowa, United States. It was built to house the warehouse needs of the Schroeder-Kleine Grocer Company and the M.M. Walker Company, two of the most prominent wholesale food distributors in the upper Midwest at the turn of the 20th century. Local builders Shields & Bradley constructed the three-story warehouse in 1894 so that the two firms could operate independent of each other. When the two firms merged in 1921, the building became fully interconnected. It was used as a food distribution warehouse until 1959. Other commercial ventures that have been housed here have included beer and soda bottling and distribution, chemical production, overhead door sales, hair products retailer, and pet groomer.

In addition to its commercial importance, the building is also considered a significant example of a late 19th century Romanesque Revival warehouse. This was one of several large warehouses built in that style during the same time period in the city, and it is one of few that is still extant. Elements typical of the style found in this building include its massive limestone base, limestone string courses, brick corbelling, and round-arch windows. The building was listed on the National Register of Historic Places in 2011.
