= Johann Christian Frederick Rath House =

Historic house in Iowa, United States

- U.S. National Register of Historic Places
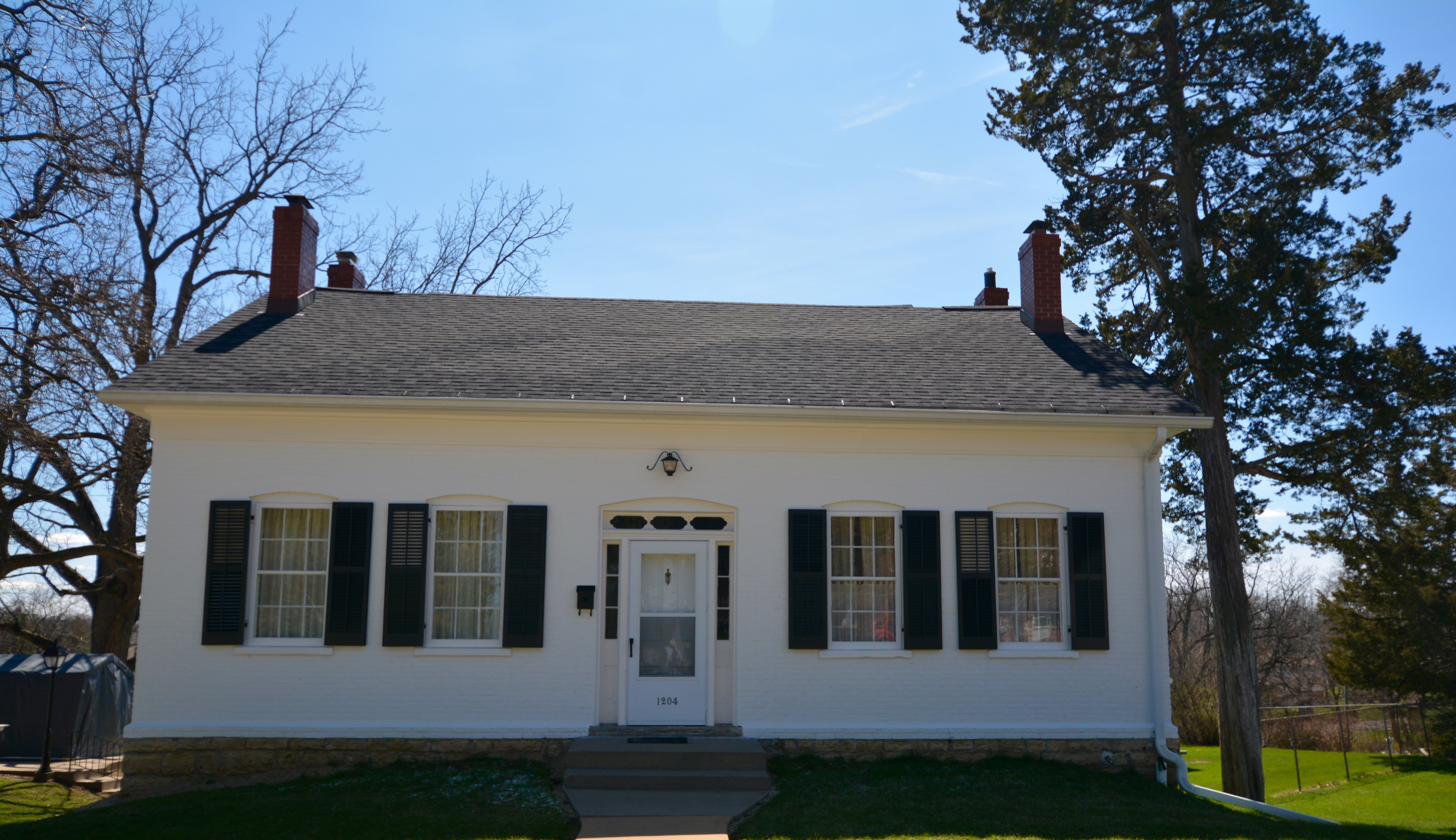

- Location within Iowa Location within the United States
- Location: 1204 Mt. Loretta Ave. Dubuque, Iowa
- Coordinates: 42°29′03.8″N 90°40′29.8″W
- Area: less than one acre
- Built: 1852-1853
- Built by: Johann Christian Rath
- NRHP reference No.: 77000514
- Added to NRHP: April 11, 1977

The Johann Christian Frederick Rath House is a historic building located in Dubuque, Iowa, United States. Rath settled in the Dubuque are from his native Hanover in 1851. He was a wood worker, farmer and lead miner. He acquired property along what is now Mt. Loretta Avenue and gave parcels to his children as they came of age. Rath completed this house in 1853. He died in 1881 and the house remained in the family until 1937. The house is a 1½-story brick structure with a walk-out basement. The side-gable roof has a large dormer on the back that was created from two smaller dormers in 1940. Also on the rear of the house is a full-length, two-story porch. The house's general form, window shapes, chimney placement and its five-bay, symmetrical plan suggests the Georgian Revival style. It was listed on the National Register of Historic Places in 1977.
