= Four Mounds Estate Historic District =

Historic district in Iowa, United States

- U.S. National Register of Historic Places
- U.S. Historic district
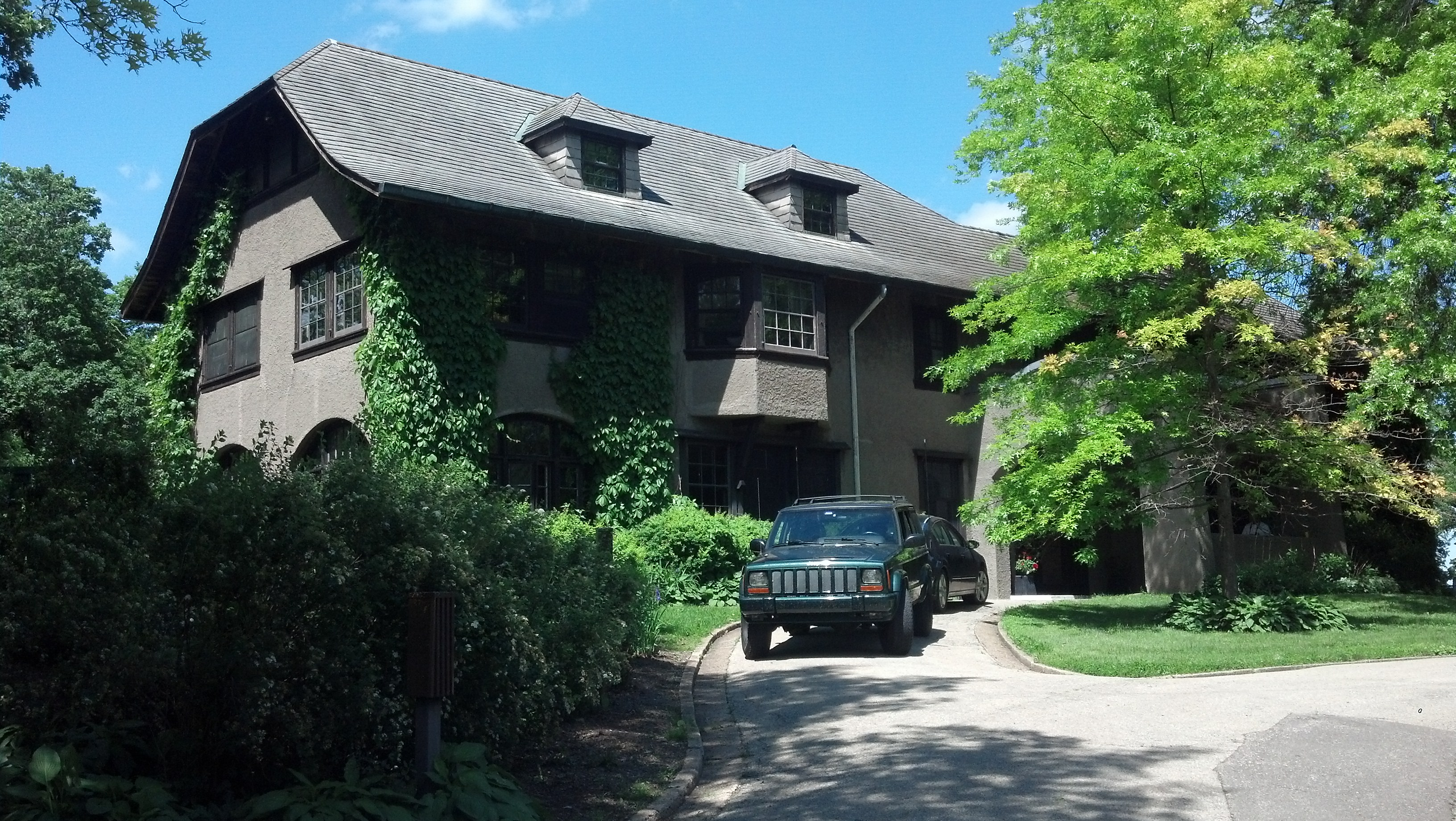
- Grey House (1908)

- Location within Iowa Location within the United States
- Location: 4900 Peru Rd. Dubuque, Iowa
- Coordinates: 42°33′11″N 90°40′39″W
- Area: 60 acres (24 ha)
- Architect: Lawrence Buck; A. Phelps Wyman
- Architectural style: Bungalow/Craftsman; Colonial Revival
- NRHP reference No.: 01001487
- Added to NRHP: January 24, 2002

Four Mounds Estate Historic District is a nationally recognized historic district located in Dubuque, Iowa, United States. It was listed on the National Register of Historic Places in 2002. At the time of its nomination the district consisted of 19 resources, including 11 contributing buildings, two contributing sites, four non-contributing structures, and two non-contributing buildings. The estate is named for the four conical burial mounds that are located on the property. They are one of the historic sites, and they are individually listed on the National Register of Historic Places.

== History ==
Four Mounds was a gentleman's farm developed by George and Viola Burden in the early 20th century. They lived and raised their children in the country, while George Burden was able to easily commute to work downtown. The district includes 17 buildings that were used for residential, farm, recreational and support purposes. The farm buildings were generally constructed between 1908 and 1911. The Chauffeur's House was built in 1907, and it is the oldest structure in the historic district. The buildings are located on a 60-acre (24 ha) estate located above a bluff overlooking the Mississippi River. Chicago landscape architect A. Phelps Wyman designed the cultured grounds, which include historic gardens, woodlands, prairie, and a rare oak savanna. Chicago architect Lawrence Buck designed the family's Craftsman house, known as the Grey House (1908). Their son Bill and his wife Elizabeth took over the farm for his parents and they built the Colonial Revival White House in 1924. Its architect is unknown. The farm stayed in the family until 1982 when it was given to the City of Dubuque when Elizabeth died. At the time of her death, there was still a full-time staff that lived on the estate.

A non-profit organization began running Four Mounds in 1987. Three of the houses are used as bed and breakfast inns, and the Grey house also functions as a small conference center. Visitors may hike the trails on the grounds, and view the refurbished buildings. The estate is a part of the Silos & Smokestacks National Heritage Area.
