= Sherrill, Iowa =

- City
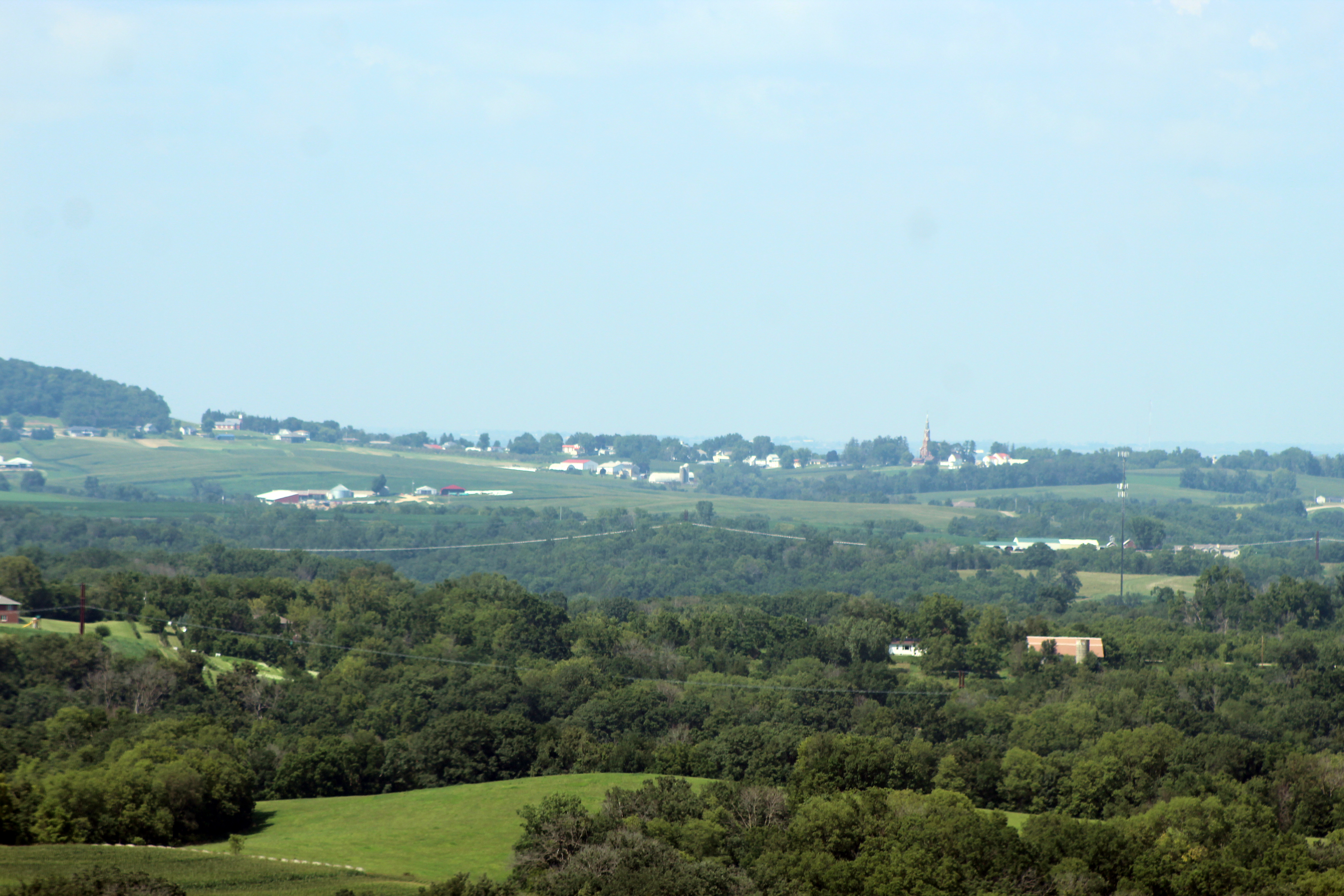
- Sherrill seen from Lore Mound.

- Location of Sherrill, Iowa
- Coordinates: 42°36′17″N 90°47′03″W
- Country: United States
- State: Iowa
- County: Dubuque

Area
  - Total: 0.13 sq mi (0.34 km^{2})
  - Land: 0.13 sq mi (0.34 km^{2})
  - Water: 0 sq mi (0.00 km^{2})
- Elevation: 974 ft (297 m)

Population (2020)
  - Total: 189
  - Density: 1,427.8/sq mi (551.28/km^{2})
- Time zone: UTC-6 (Central (CST))
  - Summer (DST): UTC-5 (CDT)
- ZIP code: 52073
- Area code: 563
- FIPS code: 19-72660
- GNIS feature ID: 2395874

Sherrill is a city in Dubuque County, Iowa, United States. The population was 189 at the time of the 2020 census, up from 186 in 2000.

== History ==
Sherrill was named for two brothers, Adam and Isaac Sherrill, and was originally called Sherrill's Mound or Mount, since the city is at the base of a prominent hill. In 1856, Peter Fries, an Austrian immigrant, built a large, stone inn at the main crossroads of the city. It was popular with newlyweds, and Jesse James and his gang were reported to have stayed there before their famous raid on Northfield, Minnesota. The structure has survived and been restored as the Black Horse Inn. Large numbers of German immigrants settled in Sherrill and the surrounding rural area in the 19th century. German Catholic (SS. Peter and Paul), German Lutheran (St. Matthew), German Methodist, and German Evangelical churches were founded and remain active. Sherrill was one of ten "Beer Towns" incorporated in Dubuque County in 1933 to ensure that the city's taverns could serve beer, under a possibly mistaken interpretation of Iowa law that licenses to dispense beer could only be granted to premises inside incorporated places. Sherrill's post office was established in 1858, with Peter Fries as postmaster. Its Zip Code is 52073.

== Geography ==
According to the United States Census Bureau, the city has a total area of 0.13 square miles (0.34 km^{2}), all land.

== Establishments ==
The town is known for Breitbach's Country Dining, which was opened in 1852 by a federal permit from U.S. President Millard Fillmore.

== Demographics ==
Historical populations
Year	Pop.	±%
1940	82	—
1950	162	+97.6%
1960	174	+7.4%
1970	190	+9.2%
1980	208	+9.5%
1990	148	−28.8%
2000	186	+25.7%
2010	177	−4.8%
2020	189	+6.8%
Source:"U.S. Census website". United States Census Bureau. and Iowa Data Center; Source: U.S. Decennial Census

=== 2020 census ===
As of the census of 2020, there were 189 people, 77 households, and 63 families residing in the city. The population density was 1,427.8 inhabitants per square mile (551.3/km^{2}). There were 78 housing units at an average density of 589.3 per square mile (227.5/km^{2}). The racial makeup of the city was 97.9% White, 1.1% Black or African American, 0.0% Native American, 0.0% Asian, 0.0% Pacific Islander, 0.0% from other races and 1.1% from two or more races. Hispanic or Latino persons of any race comprised 1.1% of the population.

Of the 77 households, 39.0% of which had children under the age of 18 living with them, 62.3% were married couples living together, 5.2% were cohabitating couples, 13.0% had a female householder with no spouse or partner present and 19.5% had a male householder with no spouse or partner present. 18.2% of all households were non-families. 14.3% of all households were made up of individuals, 6.5% had someone living alone who was 65 years old or older.

The median age in the city was 36.4 years. 28.0% of the residents were under the age of 20; 4.2% were between the ages of 20 and 24; 27.5% were from 25 and 44; 23.8% were from 45 and 64; and 16.4% were 65 years of age or older. The gender makeup of the city was 49.2% male and 50.8% female.

=== 2010 census ===
As of the census of 2010, there were 177 people, 73 households, and 54 families living in the city. The population density was 1,361.5 inhabitants per square mile (525.7/km^{2}). There were 74 housing units at an average density of 569.2 per square mile (219.8/km^{2}). The racial makeup of the city was 94.9% White, 2.3% African American, and 2.8% from other races. Hispanic or Latino of any race were 2.8% of the population.

There were 73 households, of which 31.5% had children under the age of 18 living with them, 63.0% were married couples living together, 6.8% had a female householder with no husband present, 4.1% had a male householder with no wife present, and 26.0% were non-families. 24.7% of all households were made up of individuals, and 15.1% had someone living alone who was 65 years of age or older. The average household size was 2.42 and the average family size was 2.89.

The median age in the city was 42.5 years. 23.7% of residents were under the age of 18; 9.1% were between the ages of 18 and 24; 19.8% were from 25 to 44; 24.2% were from 45 to 64; and 23.2% were 65 years of age or older. The gender makeup of the city was 52.5% male and 47.5% female.

=== 2000 census ===
As of the census of 2000, there were 186 people, 70 households, and 52 families living in the city. The population density was 1,753.9 inhabitants per square mile (677.2/km^{2}). There were 77 housing units at an average density of 726.1 per square mile (280.3/km^{2}). The racial makeup of the city was 100.00% White. Hispanic or Latino of any race were 2.15% of the population.

There were 70 households, out of which 31.4% had children under the age of 18 living with them, 68.6% were married couples living together, 5.7% had a female householder with no husband present, and 24.3% were non-families. 20.0% of all households were made up of individuals, and 12.9% had someone living alone who was 65 years of age or older. The average household size was 2.66 and the average family size was 3.13.

In the city, the population was spread out, with 27.4% under the age of 18, 4.8% from 18 to 24, 26.3% from 25 to 44, 22.6% from 45 to 64, and 18.8% who were 65 years of age or older. The median age was 40 years. For every 100 females, there were 104.4 males. For every 100 females age 18 and over, there were 101.5 males.

The median income for a household in the city was $38,125, and the median income for a family was $44,688. Males had a median income of $31,250 versus $20,000 for females. The per capita income for the city was $21,118. None of the families and 3.3% of the population were living below the poverty line.

== Gallery ==
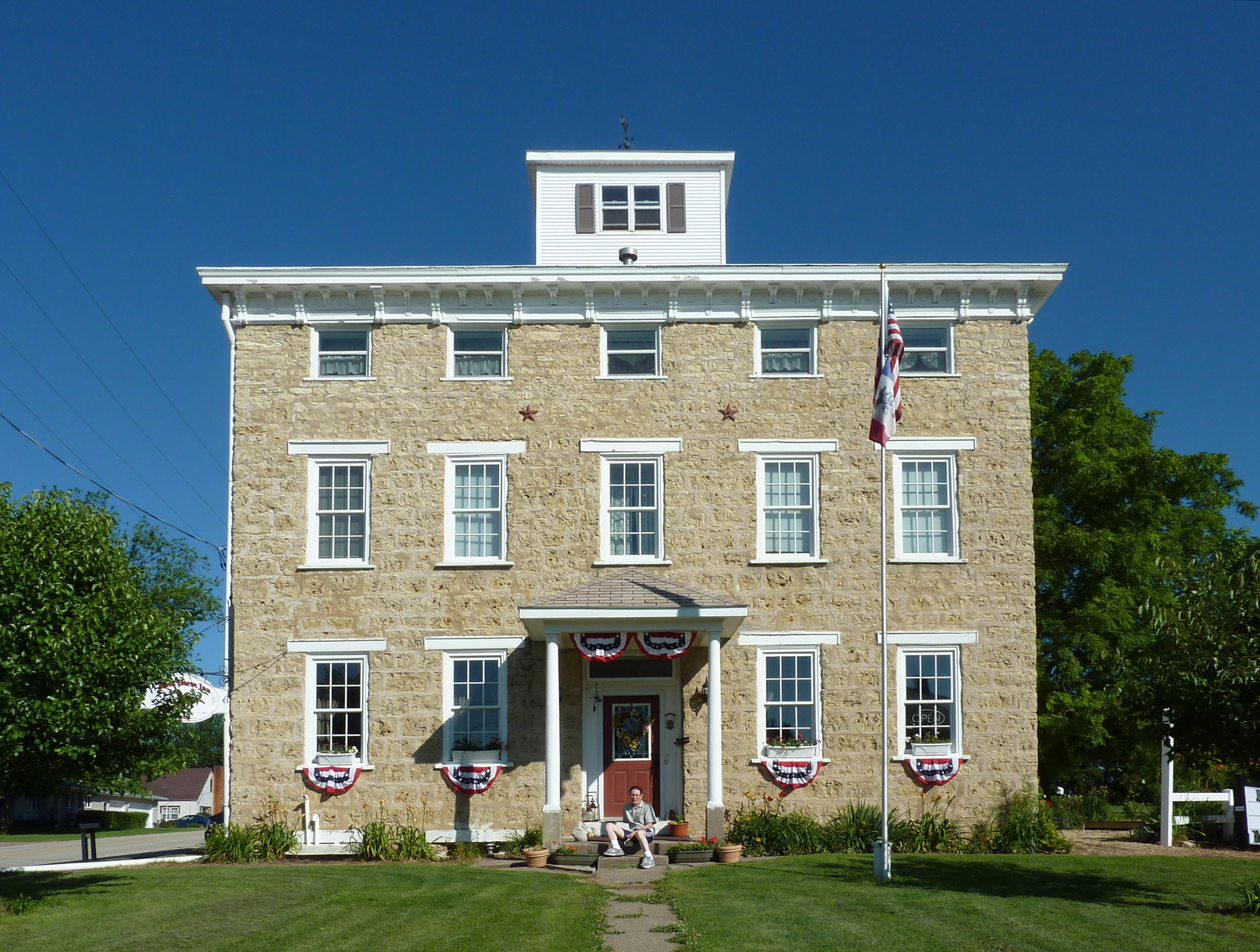
Black Horse Inn, originally the Sherrill Mount House

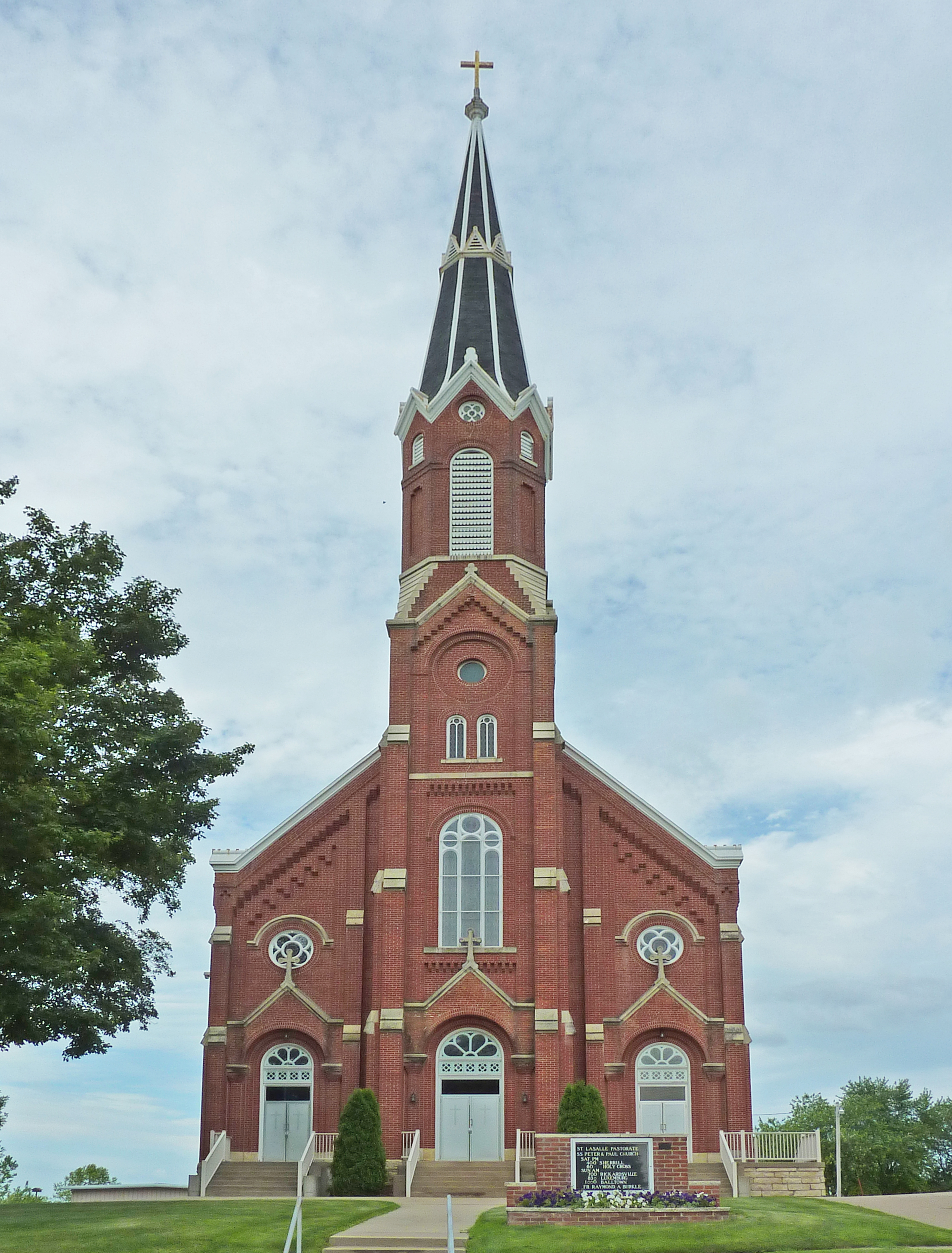
SS. Peter and Paul Catholic Church

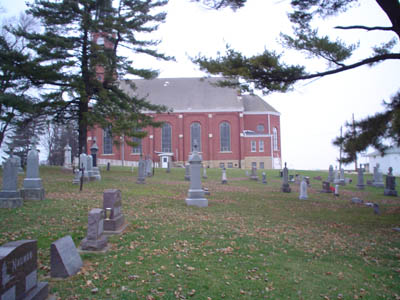
SS. Peter and Paul viewed from the cemetery

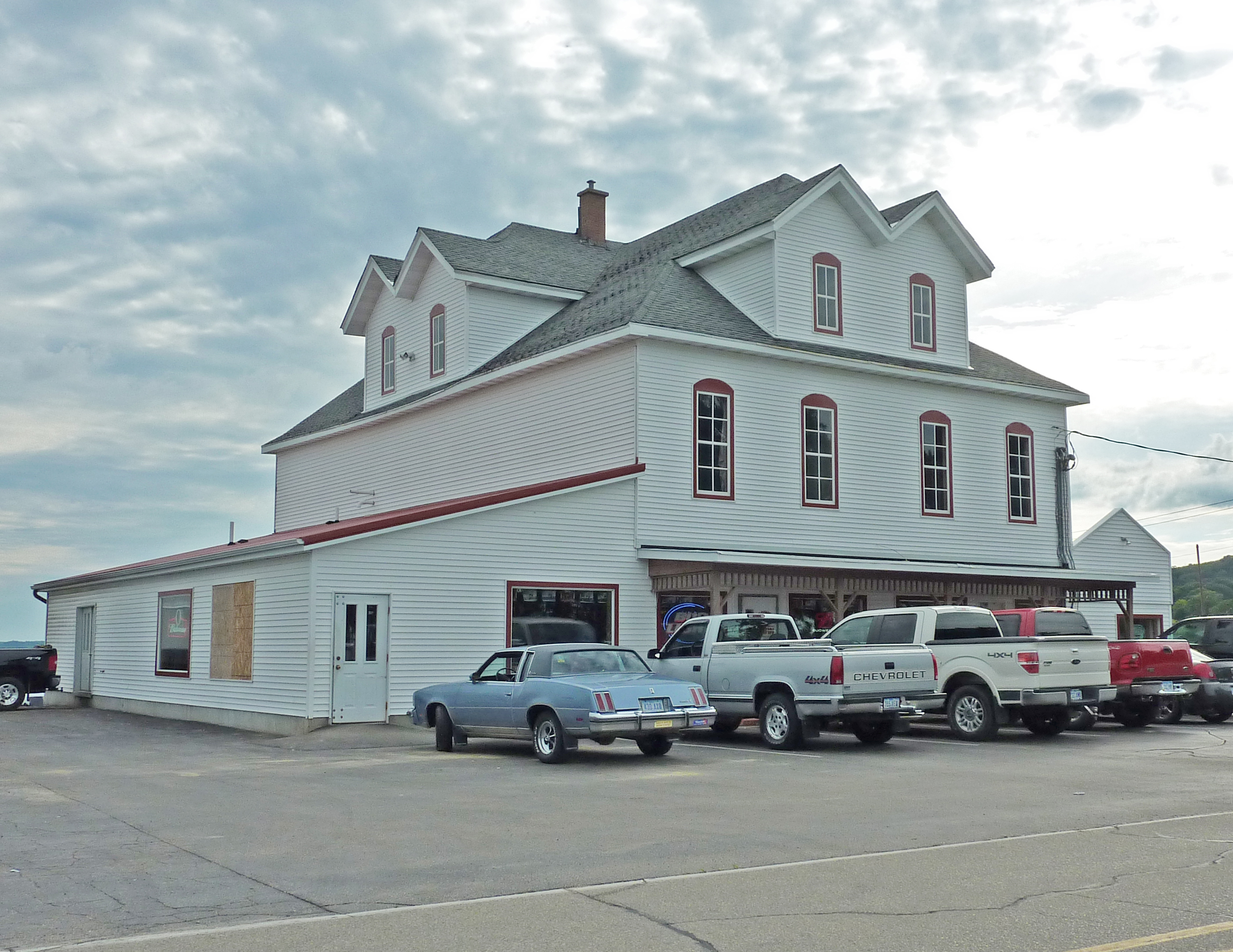
The Barn Bar
