= Port of Dubuque Marina =

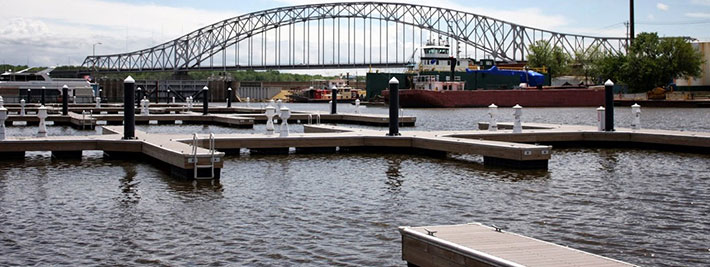
- Port of Dubuque Marina, 2013

Location
- Country: United States
- Location: Dubuque, Iowa
- Coordinates: 42°29′43″N 90°39′35″W

Details
- Opened: June 1, 2013
- No. of berths: 78

Statistics
- Website; Port of Dubuque Marina

The Port of Dubuque Marina is primarily a transient marina, with limited seasonal slip rentals available. The Port of Dubuque Marina's seventy-eight (78) slips include fifty-four (54) 30", twenty (2) 40", and four (4) 50". By utilizing the end ties, or T-heads of the docks, the Port of Dubuque Marina can accommodate a boat up to 100" in length. The docks are rented out to boaters by the day, with a maximum stay of ten consecutive days. The Port of Dubuque Marina also offers an hourly rate for boaters who would like to dock and stay for only a short time and enjoy some of the many nearby attractions. In addition to slip rentals the Port of Dubuque Marina offers fuel sales (unleaded and diesel), and pump out services to visiting boats. The amenities building houses private boater restrooms with shower and laundry facilities, public restrooms, and a Marina convenience store.

== Location ==
The Port of Dubuque Marina is located in the historic Ice Harbor of Dubuque, Iowa. The entrance to the Port of Dubuque Marina is located on mile 597.4 on the Upper Mississippi River. The entrance to the harbor is through the flood control gates of the Senator flood wall which was constructed in 1969. This makes the Port of Dubuque Marina well protected from the current of the Mississippi. During high river levels the flood gates are closed, and boat traffic into and out of the Ice Harbor stops.

== History ==
The Port of Dubuque Marina and amenities building was constructed with a Boating Infrastructure tier 2 Grant received from the U.S. Fish and Wildlife Service. The project was completed in time for a June 1, 2013 ribbon cutting ceremony held at the neighboring National Mississippi River Museum and Aquarium.
