= Grand River Event Center =

Convention center

Coordinates: 42.498221°N 90.655345°W

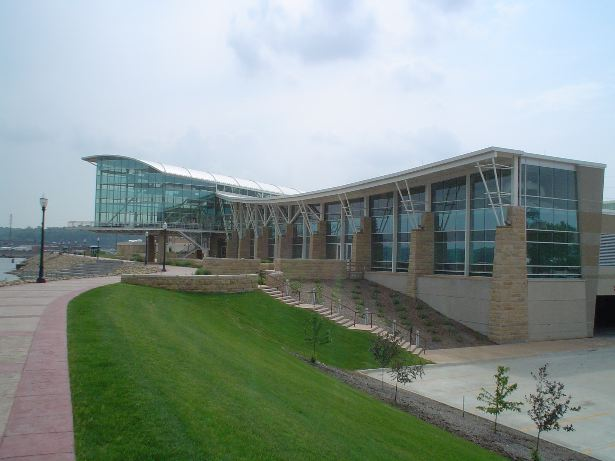
The Grand River Center as seen from the Mississippi Riverwalk.

The Grand River Event Center is a convention center located in Dubuque, Iowa. It is on the riverfront of the Mississippi River, and is part of the America's River Campus at the Port of Dubuque. The center is located at 500 Bell Street.

Designed by Populous, the center has about 86,000 square feet (8,000 m^{2}) of space for meetings, conferences, and other social functions. It is designed to accommodate groups ranging in size from 10 to 3,000. There are 12 flexible spaces that can be used for meetings and other functions. The most striking feature of the building is the "River Room," a special glass-walled room that overlooks the Mississippi river. The building is connected by a skywalk to the Grand Harbor Resort & Waterpark, which is adjacent to the events center. The center offers a number of services - such as high speed internet, catering, and underground parking.

During the 2004 Presidential campaign, President George W. Bush appeared in two campaign events that were held at the center.

== See also ==
- Dubuque, Iowa
- Port of Dubuque
- Grand Harbor Resort and Waterpark
