= WVRE =

- Dickeyville, Wisconsin; United States
- Broadcast area: Dubuque, Iowa
- Frequency: 101.1 MHz
- Branding: 101.1 The River

Programming
- Format: Country
- Affiliations: Fox News Radio

Ownership
- Owner: Radio Dubuque, Inc.
- Sister stations: KATF, KDTH, KGRR

Technical information
- Licensing authority: FCC
- Facility ID: 77086
- Class: A
- ERP: 3,700 watts
- HAAT: 129.0 meters (423.2 ft)
- Transmitter coordinates: 42°31′44.00″N 90°36′58.00″W

Links
- Public license information: Public file; LMS
- Website: 1011theriver.com

WVRE (101.1 FM) is a radio station broadcasting a Country format. Licensed to Dickeyville, Wisconsin, United States, the station serves the Dubuque area. The station is currently owned by Radio Dubuque, Inc. and features programming from Fox News Radio.

WVRE plays "Continuous Country Favorites". "The River" is the first to play New Country. WVRE includes The Morning Show with host Zach Dillon, mid-days with Ben Scott, and afternoons with Megan Schumacher. The River also broadcasts the CT40 with Fitz every Saturday.
