= KDTH =

Radio station in Dubuque, Iowa

- Dubuque, Iowa; United States
- Broadcast area: Tri-States (Illinois, Iowa, Wisconsin)
- Frequency: 1370 kHz C-QUAM AM Stereo
- Branding: AM 1370 KDTH

Programming
- Format: Adult standards/MOR
- Affiliations: ABC News Radio; Compass Media Networks

Ownership
- Owner: Radio Dubuque, Inc.
- Sister stations: KATF, KGRR, WVRE

History
- First air date: May 4, 1941
- Call sign meaning: Dubuque Telegraph Herald (former owner)

Technical information
- Licensing authority: FCC
- Facility ID: 73662
- Class: B
- Power: 5,000 watts
- Transmitter coordinates: 42°29′6.01″N 90°38′39.46″W

Links
- Public license information: Public file; LMS
- Webcast: Listen live
- Website: www.radiodubuque.com/kdth/

KDTH (1370 AM) is a radio station based in Dubuque, Iowa. The station is owned by Radio Dubuque. KDTH is a "full service" local radio station with a full-time news department, sports director, farm director and staff of local personalities, many of whom have been part of the Dubuque radio scene for more than 30 years. Its transmitter and towers are located across the Mississippi River from Dubuque in East Dubuque, Illinois, just south of the U.S. 20 Bridge. The daytime signal is 5 kilowatts non-directional utilizing one tower while the nighttime signal is 5,000 watts directional utilizing all four towers on-site to direct the signal primarily to the north.

The KDTH music format is described as Legendary Performers - Unforgettable Songs and it includes familiar oldies of the 1950s, 1960s and 1970s blended with recordings by Sinatra, Bennett, Nat King Cole and others plus contemporary talents like Diana Krall, Jane Monheim, Rod Stewart, Carly Simon, Michael Buble and others who record songs from what is now called The Great American Songbook.

The station targets the large 45+ demographic in the tri-state area of Iowa, Wisconsin & Illinois.

== History ==
On Sunday, May 4, 1941, KDTH began broadcasting. The station was housed at 8th and Bluff Streets in Dubuque - where it has remained to this day. The station broadcast with 1000 watts. The transmitter was located in East Dubuque, Illinois, and it featured a three tower array.

The station became established as an important news and information source in the Dubuque area. People like Bob Gribben, Betty Thomas, Gerald “Red” McAleece, and Gordon Kilgore became familiar names to a large part of the population.

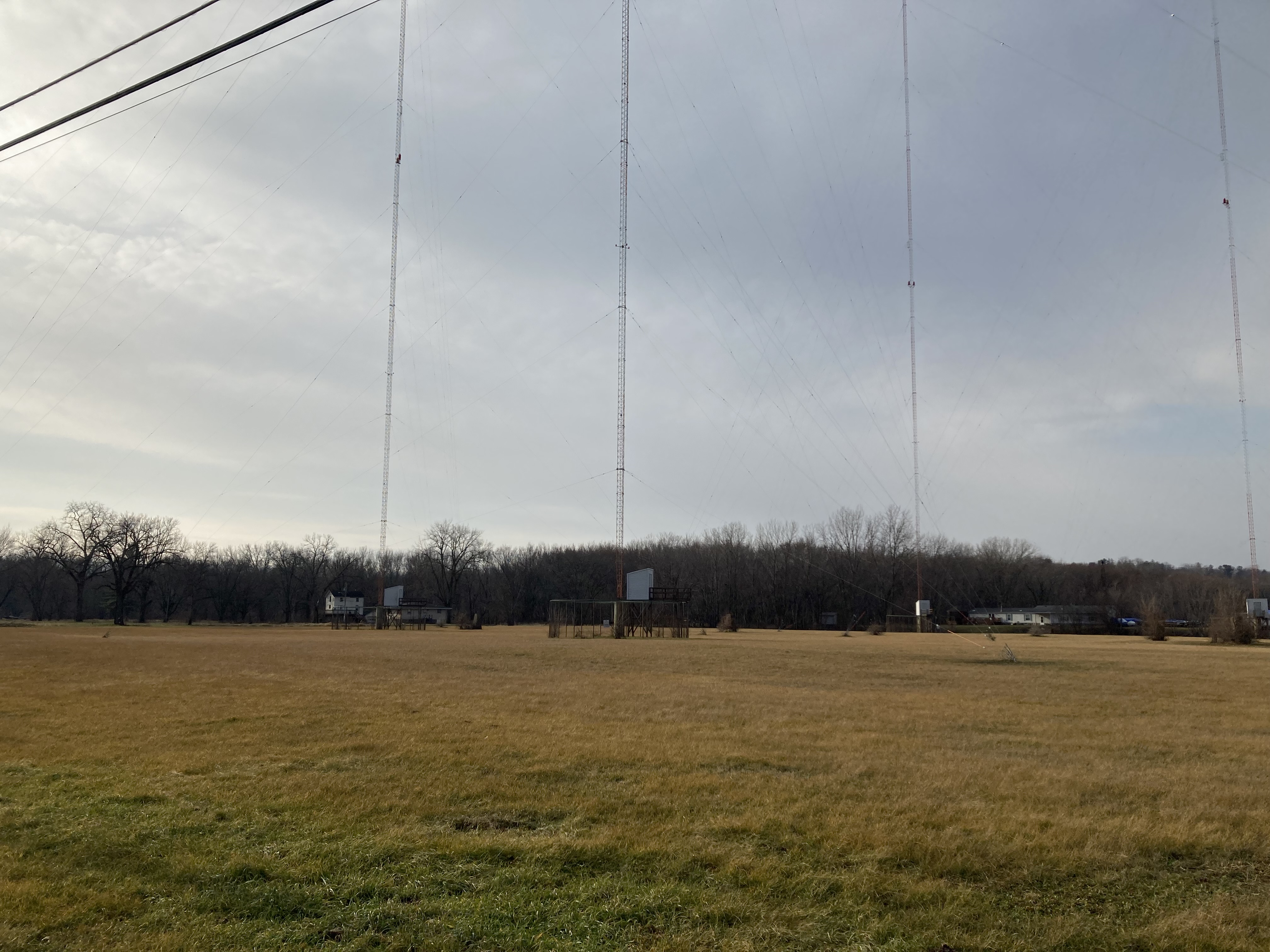
Transmitter for KDTH-AM, all 4 antennas

== See also ==
- Radio Dubuque
