= Port of Dubuque =

Section of downtown Dubuque, Iowa

Coordinates: 42.497678°N 90.655711°W

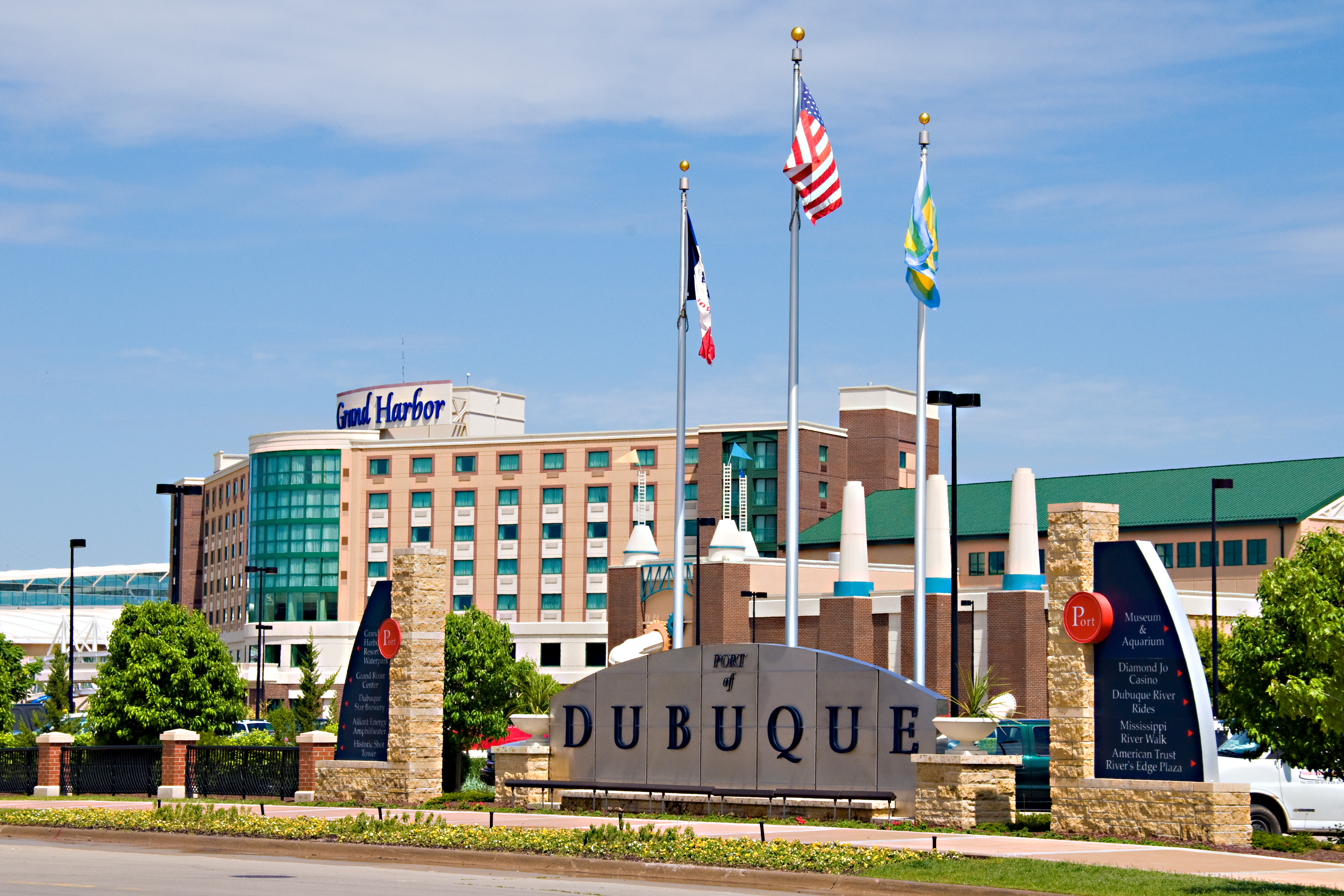
The Grand Harbor Resort as seen from E 3rd and Bell Street

The Port of Dubuque (also known as the Ice Harbor, 4th Street Peninsula, or the Riverfront) is the section of downtown Dubuque, Iowa, United States, that is immediately adjacent to the Mississippi River. The area was among the first areas settled in what became the City of Dubuque, and the State of Iowa. Historically, the area has been a center of heavy industry, but has recently seen extensive reinvestment and new construction. The area is now one of the main tourist destinations in Dubuque, as well as Iowa.

The Port of Dubuque includes all of the area that lies north of the CCPR rail yards, south of East 9th Street and Dove Harbor, east of the CCPR/ICER railroad tracks, and west of the Mississippi River. It is divided into two main sections: the North Port and the South Port, which are separated by the Ice Harbor.

The Port area is separated from Downtown Dubuque's central business district by a double set of railroad tracks and an expressway that carries U.S. highways 151 and 61. The North Port can be accessed via East 5th Street, or the East 3rd Street overpass, while the South Port is accessible from Jones Street, or Ice Harbor Drive—which connects the two ports together.

== History ==
The Port of Dubuque was one of the first areas settled in what is now Downtown Dubuque. Its proximity to the river made the area convenient for a variety of industrial uses, including boat building, lumber transportation and storage, and ice harvesting. The 1868 opening of the first Dubuque Railroad Bridge to Illinois also strengthened the Port's role as a center for heavy industry. In addition to these purposes, the Port was a major landing site for many of the steamboats which traveled on the river. However, for most of its history, the low-lying Port area was unprotected against the frequent spring flooding of the Mississippi. For this reason, much of the city's commercial and retail businesses were built farther inland, centered on West 9th and Main Streets.

The Port area was an ideal location for some of the city's early manufacturing companies. In the 19th and early 20th centuries, Dubuque was a major boat building center on the Mississippi River, and this industry was centered on the Port area and the Ice Harbor. Alongside boat building, the port had lumber yards, the Dubuque Star Brewery and a Civil War-era shot tower.

The region has long been a transportation center in Dubuque. U.S. highways 20, 151, 61, 52, and Iowa Highway 3 all converge in the Port of Dubuque. The Chicago Central and Pacific and Iowa, Chicago and Eastern railroads run through the Port area. The Dubuque Railroad Bridge, built in the 1890s, connected the city with population centers to the east. The Ice Harbor and Mississippi shoreline were the site of steamboat arrivals and departures in the city, and three of the city's four train stations were located in or near the area.

In 1943, the Julien Dubuque Bridge was completed south of the Ice Harbor, thereby moving vehicular traffic over the Port, instead of through it, across the old Dubuque "High" Bridge. Following a record-breaking flood in 1965, the City of Dubuque began construction on a 30-foot-high (9.1 m) flood protection wall to protect all of the city's riverfront from the seasonal flooding of the Mississippi River. This was completed in 1973. Boat building ended in the area in the early 1970s, and brewing came to a halt shortly after.

The Port of Dubuque remained largely inactive until 1990. At that time, Iowa legalized riverboat gambling and the Casino Belle opened, afloat in the Ice Harbor. That boat was replaced in the mid-1990s by the Diamond Jo Casino (now Diamond Jo Dubuque), named after the Dubuque boatbuilder "Diamond" Joe Reynolds and his Diamond Jo Boat Line.

In the late 1990s, the City of Dubuque saw an opportunity to expand on the existing tourism market by adding a major river-themed museum to the area. Alongside a new museum, the city proposed a new hotel and indoor water park attraction, a large convention center, riverwalk and other amenities. This was all part of the "America's River Project", a $188 million revitalization of the North Port. In the early 2000s, the city won a huge $40 million grant from the "Vision Iowa" Fund for the construction of the various attractions.

== Major attractions and sites ==
=== Port of Dubuque Marina ===
The City of Dubuque has completed a $4.1 million project that includes a new 78-slip marina and amenities building. The Port of Dubuque Marina opened on June 1, 2013, and is a 100% transient marina in the heart of Downtown Dubuque. The Port of Dubuque Marina is able to accommodate boats that are up to 90 feet (27 m) and offers slip rentals, fuels sales (unleaded and diesel) and pump out service. In addition to the docks, the Port of Dubuque Marina includes private boater restrooms with shower and laundry facilities, public restrooms and a convenience store that offers a wide selection of items. The Port of Dubuque Marina is located in the historic Ice Harbor just south of the Dubuque Rail Bridge and north of the Julien Dubuque (US HWY 20) bridge.

=== Diamond Jo Dubuque ===
The Diamond Jo Dubuque casino includes 777 slot machines, 17 table games and several restaurants. It is among the largest attractions in the area.

=== Grand Harbor Resort and Waterpark ===
The Grand Harbor Resort and Waterpark is a 193-room, family-oriented hotel complex. The facility is connected to the Grand River Center and has a 25,000-square-foot (2,300 m^{2}) water park as its main attraction. Many of its rooms have excellent views of the Mississippi River and Downtown Dubuque.

=== Grand River Center ===
The Grand River Center is Dubuque's largest convention center. The facility has 86,000 square feet (8,000 m^{2}) of meeting space and regularly plays host to weddings, car shows, regional conventions and presidential candidates. It is connected by skywalk to the Grand Harbor Resort and Waterpark and has underground parking, high-speed internet and catering services.

=== National Mississippi River Museum and Aquarium ===
The National Mississippi River Museum and Aquarium is the signature attraction in the Port of Dubuque. Affiliated with the Smithsonian Institution, it is the largest of its kind, and includes dozens of interactive, family-friendly exhibits. The complex also has a large aquarium component, including turtles, otters, fish and other wildlife found along the river. In addition to these, the facility has theaters, a working wetland and the restored William M. Black dredge boat for tourists to explore.

=== McGraw Hill, LLC ===
In October 2007, McGraw Hill opened its new $32 million, 140,000-square-foot (13,000 m^{2}), 4-story office complex in the port. The new building accommodates the headquarters of the company's Higher Education Division and 400 employees. The structure is located at the NW corner of East 5th and Bell Streets.

=== Mississippi Riverwalk ===
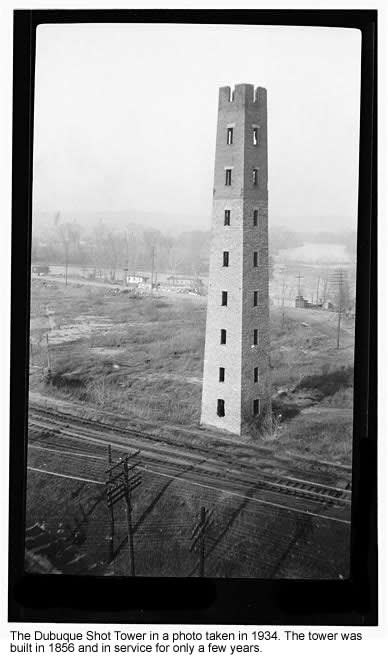
The Dubuque Shot Tower as seen in 1934.

The Mississippi Riverwalk is a half-mile long walkway along the Mississippi riverbank in the Port of Dubuque. It runs from the Ice Harbor in the south to the Dubuque Rail Bridge and Alliant Energy Amphitheater in the north. The walkway is situated atop Dubuque's flood protection levee and provides excellent views of both the Mississippi River and Downtown Dubuque. It includes the American Trust and Savings Bank River's Edge Plaza, benches, and numerous informational displays detailing the history of the Port of Dubuque.

The Riverwalk is one part of a series of riverfront trails and walkways recently completed by the City of Dubuque. The trail system will, in its finality, be interconnected and link up the various parks and tourist attractions along Dubuque's Mississippi Riverfront.

=== Shot Tower ===
The Dubuque Shot Tower is a National Historic Landmark, originally used to produce lead shot for the U.S. military's muskets. After many years of service, including munitions production during the American Civil War, it was used as a fire watchtower for a lumber yard located at the site. It was built in 1856, and is located at what is now the northern end of Bell Street, near the Dubuque Railroad Bridge. The Shot Tower is among the oldest surviving structures in Dubuque.

After many years of neglect following the demise of Dubuque's lumber industry, the tower is now being studied for planned repair costs. It will almost certainly see major repairs and restoration as a part of the riverfront revitalization effort.

=== Spirit of Dubuque ===
The dual paddlewheeler Spirit of Dubuque was designed by Dubuque native Robert Kehl with the help of a New Orleans marine engineering firm in 1976. It is a replica of a century-old Mississippi River steamboat with Victorian decor. She made her 1,385-mile (2,229 km) maiden voyage in spring 1977, with eight cases of bananas. Captain Walt and Nancy Webster have owned the Spirit of Dubuque since May 1994 and now operate a sightseeing company with the boat. The 118-foot (36 m) boat can carry 377 passengers.

== See also ==
- Parks in Dubuque, Iowa
