= Grand Harbor Resort and Waterpark =

Resort and indoor waterpark in Dubuque

Coordinates: 42.4970°N 90.6569°W

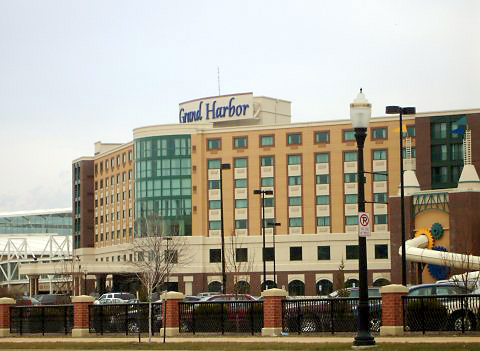
The Grand Harbor Hotel, a portion of the Waterpark is visible in the right hand corner of this photo.

The Grand Harbor Resort and Waterpark is a resort hotel and indoor waterpark located in Dubuque, Iowa.

== Location and description ==
The Grand Harbor is located on the banks of the Mississippi River, next to the Grand River Event Center. Construction on the hotel began in September 2001 and was opened to the public in 2002.

The hotel features 193 rooms, 31 of which are suites. All of the rooms have a small refrigerator, a microwave, and a 27-inch (690 mm) television. The entire hotel is equipped with high speed wireless internet. Due to its location near the river, the rooms have a view of either the Mississippi River or the City of Dubuque's downtown area. The hotel features meeting spaces, the two Platinum rooms on the second floor as well as a boardroom. In addition, the Grand Harbor is attached to the Grand River Center, a large event center located on the Mississippi.

The adjoining water park is the first indoor waterpark within the state of Iowa. The waterpark has 25,000 square feet (2,300 m^{2}), with a tube waterslide, a regular pool, a basketball pool, a lazy river, a kiddie pool, 2 hot tubs, and a multi-story tree house compared with smaller slides, water guns, and an 850-gallon bucket that dumps water every 8 minutes.

The Mississippi Riverwalk adjoins the hotel. Near the hotel is the Shot Tower, the National Mississippi River Museum and Aquarium, Diamond Jo Dubuque casino, and the Dubuque Star Brewery. The Alliant Energy Amphitheater is located next to the brewery, and is the site of concerts and other events.

== Impact ==
Grand Harbor Hotel at night.

With the addition of the Grand Harbor, and with construction proceeding on a new Hilton hotel, many in the hotel industry have come to feel that the hotel market in Dubuque was becoming saturated. Because of this, the Dubuque Inn - which had been open since 1971 - was sold and then closed. The family that had owned the Dubuque Inn also put their other property - the Days Inn - up for sale as well. Despite this, a number of hotel chains were still interested in establishing properties in Dubuque, and the Dubuque Inn has since been gutted and a portion of the original hotel building is being rebuilt as a Hampton Inn.
