= Dubuque, Iowa =

Dubuque
- City
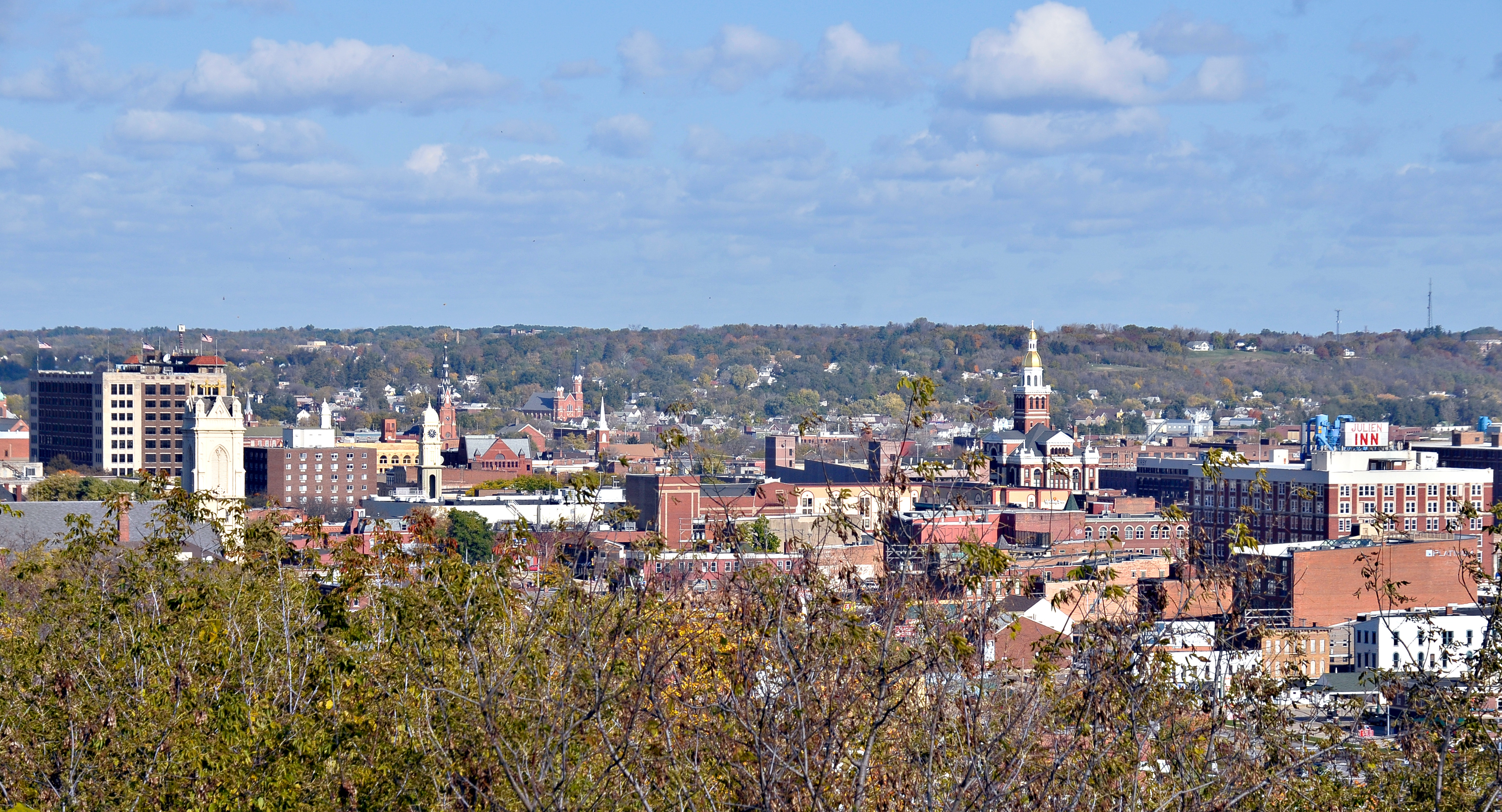
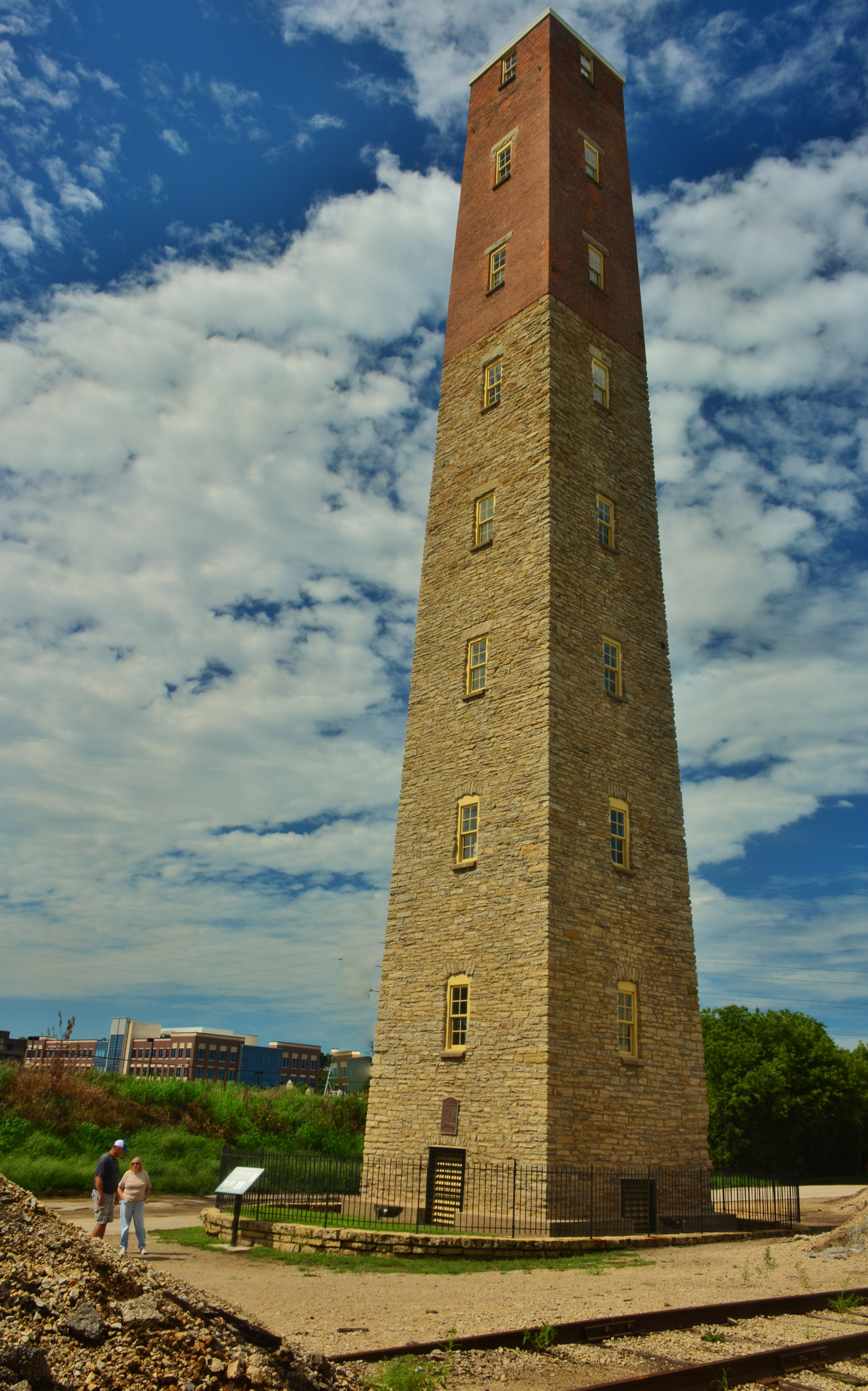
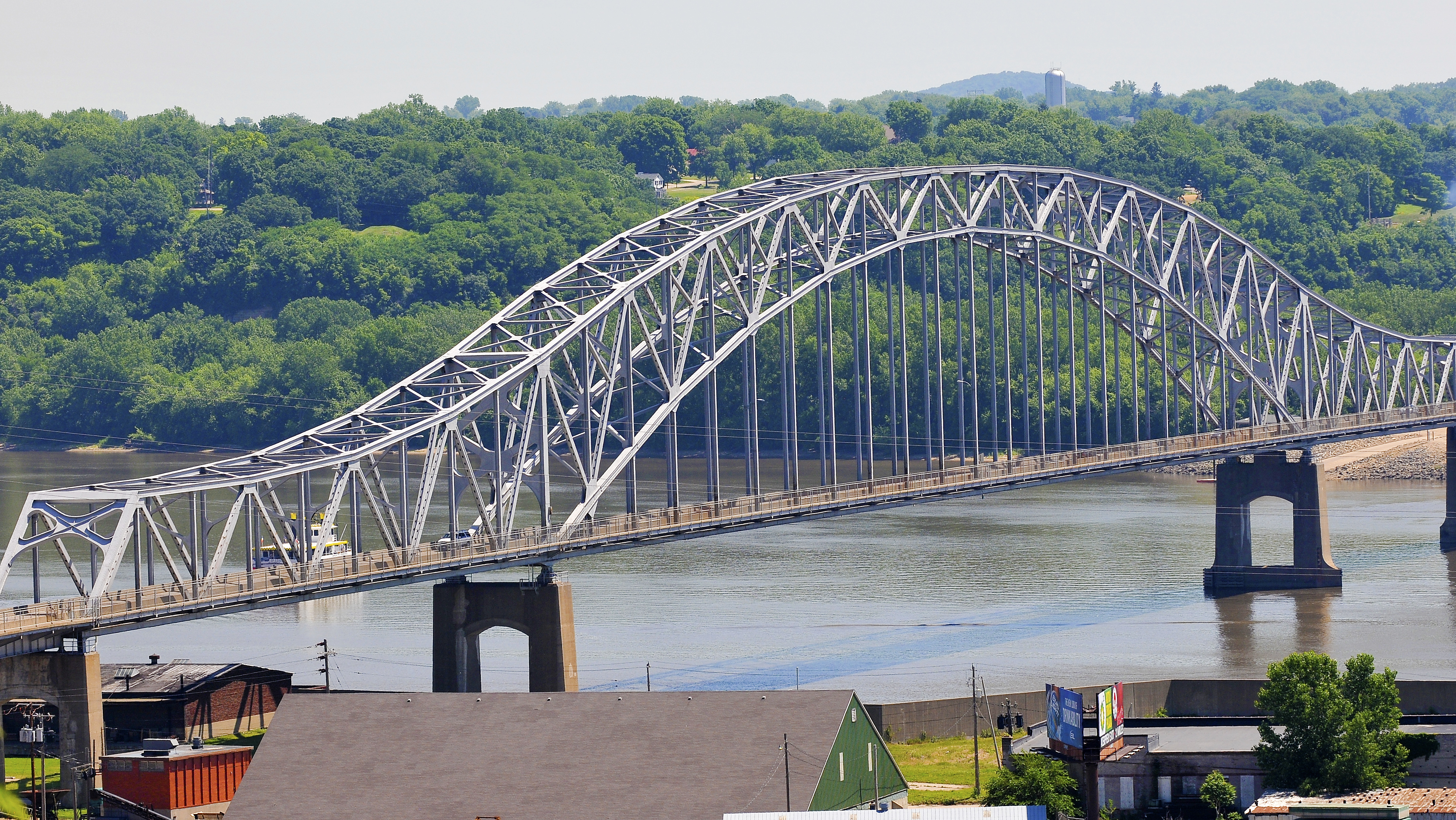
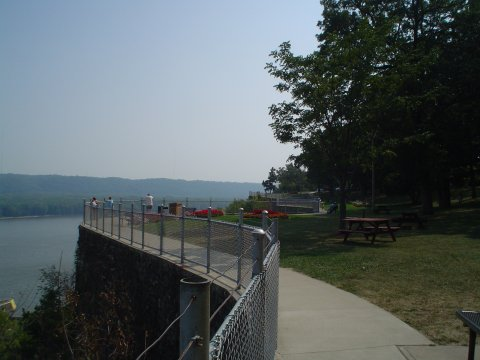
- Downtown Dubuque Fenelon Place Elevator Town Clock Shot Tower Julien Dubuque Bridge Eagle Point Park

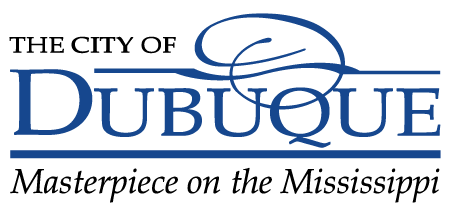
- Flag Seal Logo
- Nicknames: "The Key City", "City of Five Flags", "Masterpiece on the Mississippi"
- Motto: "Showing the Spirit"
- Interactive map of Dubuque
- Location within Iowa Location within the United States
- Coordinates: 42°29′59″N 90°43′25″W
- Country: United States
- State: Iowa
- County: Dubuque
- Settled: 1788
- Chartered: 1833
- Incorporated: January 28, 1857
- Founder: Julien Dubuque

Government
  - Type: Council-Manager
  - Mayor: Brad Cavanagh
  - City manager: Michael C. Van Milligen

Area
  - Total: 32.01 sq mi (82.90 km^{2})
  - Land: 30.92 sq mi (80.09 km^{2})
  - Water: 1.08 sq mi (2.81 km^{2})
- Elevation: 817 ft (249 m)

Population (2020)
  - Total: 59,667
  - Rank: 11th in Iowa
  - Density: 1,929.6/sq mi (745.03/km^{2})
- Time zone: UTC−6 (CST)
  - Summer (DST): UTC−5 (CDT)
- ZIP codes: 52001–52004, 52099
- Area code: 563
- FIPS code: 19-22395
- GNIS feature ID: 467744
- Website: www.cityofdubuque.org

Dubuque (/dəˈbjuːk/, dəb-YOOK) is a city in Dubuque County, Iowa, United States, and its county seat. The population was 59,667 at the 2020 census. Settled in 1788 and chartered in 1833, Dubuque is the oldest city in Iowa. It was named after French-Canadian trader and miner Julien Dubuque. The city lies along the Mississippi River at the convergence of the Iowa, Illinois, and Wisconsin borders, a region locally known as the Tri-State Area.

Dubuque is part of the Driftless Area, a portion of North America that escaped all three phases of the Wisconsin glaciation, resulting in a hilly topography unlike most of the Midwestern United States. It is a regional tourist destination featuring the city's architecture, casinos, and riverside location. It is home to five institutions of higher education. While Dubuque has historically been a center of manufacturing, the local economy also includes health care, publishing, and financial service sectors.

== History ==
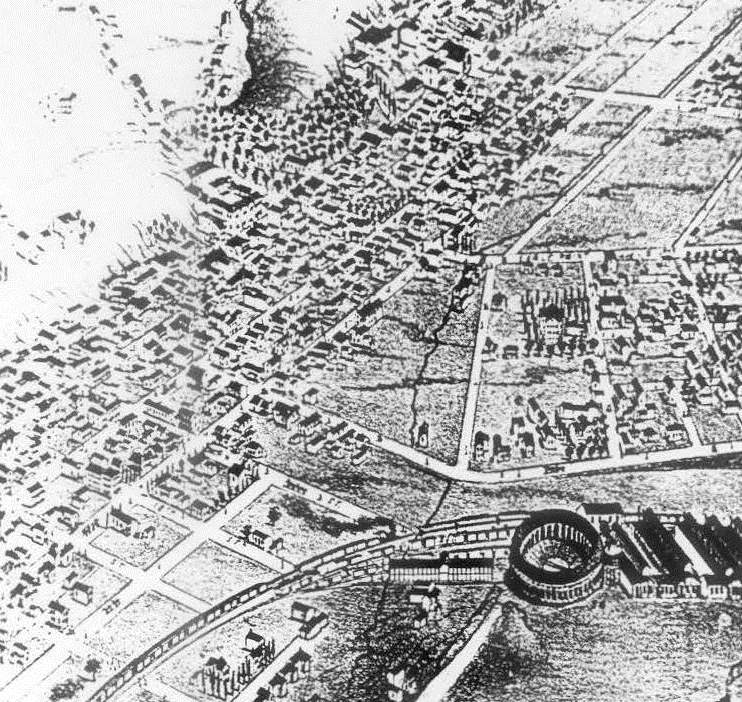
An aerial view of the City of Dubuque in 1872 by Alexander Koch.

Spain gained control of the Louisiana Territory west of the Mississippi River following the 1763 defeat of the French; the British took over all territory to the east. The first permanent European settler in what is now Dubuque was Quebecois pioneer Julien Dubuque, who arrived in 1785. In 1788, he received permission from the Spanish government and the local Meskwaki people to mine the area's rich lead deposits. Control of Louisiana and Dubuque's mines shifted briefly back to France in 1800, then to the United States in 1803, following the Louisiana Purchase. The Meskwaki continued to mine with the full support of the U.S. government until 1830 when the Meskwaki were illegally pushed out of the mine region by American prospectors.

The city of Dubuque was named after Julien Dubuque, who settled at the southern end of a large flat plain adjacent to the Mississippi River. The city was officially chartered in 1833 as part of the unorganized territory of the U.S., and is the oldest city in Iowa. The region was designated as the Iowa Territory in 1838 and was included in the newly created State of Iowa in 1846. After the lead resources were exhausted, the city became home to numerous industries. Dubuque became a center for the timber industry because of its proximity to forests in Minnesota and Wisconsin, and was later dominated by various mill working businesses. Also important were boat building, brewing, and later, the railroad industry. In 1874, the Diamond Jo Line moved its company headquarters to Dubuque. Diamond Jo Line established a shipyard at Eagle Point in 1878. Just two years later, the company was the largest employer in Dubuque, putting 78 people to work, 75 of whom worked at the shipyard earning their collective $800–$1,000 per week in wages.

Between 1860 and 1880, Dubuque was one of the 100 largest urban areas in the United States. Iowa's first church was built by Methodists in 1833.

Beginning in the mid-19th century and into the early 20th century, thousands of impoverished German, Luxembourgish and Irish Catholic immigrants came to the city to work in the manufacturing centers. The city's large Roman Catholic congregations led to its designation as the seat of the newly established Archdiocese of Dubuque. Numerous convents, abbeys, and other religious institutions were built. The ethnic German and Irish descendants maintain a strong Catholic presence in the city. Nicholas E. Gonner (1835–1892), a Catholic immigrant from Pfaffenthal in Luxembourg, founded the Catholic Publishing Company of Dubuque, Iowa. His son Nicholas E. Gonner Jr. (1870–1922) took over in 1892, editing two German-language weeklies, an English-language weekly, and the Daily Tribune, the only Catholic daily newspaper ever published in the United States.

Early in the 20th century, Dubuque was one of several sites of a brass era automobile company, Adams-Farwell; like most others, it folded. Subsequently, Dubuque grew significantly, and industrial activity remained its economic mainstay until the 1980s.

A series of changes in manufacturing and the onset of the Farm Crisis in the 1980s led to a large decline in the sector and the city's economy as a whole. In the 1990s, the economy diversified rapidly, shifting away from heavy industry. Tourism, technology, and publishing are now among the largest and fastest-growing businesses. Dubuque attracts over 2 million tourists annually.

At the start of the 21st century, the city focused its efforts on revitalizing the Port of Dubuque, which now includes the National Mississippi River Museum and Aquarium, Grand Harbor Resort and Waterpark, Grand River Event Center, Diamond Jo Dubuque casino, the nearly-mile long Mississippi Riverwalk, and Stone Cliff Winery, which is housed in the former Dubuque Star Brewery building.

Also revitalized in recent years is Chaplain Schmitt Island, located near the Dubuque-Wisconsin Bridge. Q Casino, as of 2025, is undergoing an expansion, including the addition of arcade complex Island Social, as well as the building of an amphitheater and new hotel.

In the early-to-mid 2010s, a large portion of the Dubuque Millworking Historic District was renovated. It is now home to several restaurants, stores, offices and apartments, as well as a monthly summertime night market.

For much of the 21st century, the city has worked to minimize flooding in low-lying and downslope areas, such as in the North End. Parts of the Bee Branch Creek were restored and daylighted in 2015 and 2016, with parks and trails built along its banks. Efforts to curb flash flooding in other parts of town, such as the Valley View neighborhood, continue into the 2020s.

== Geography ==
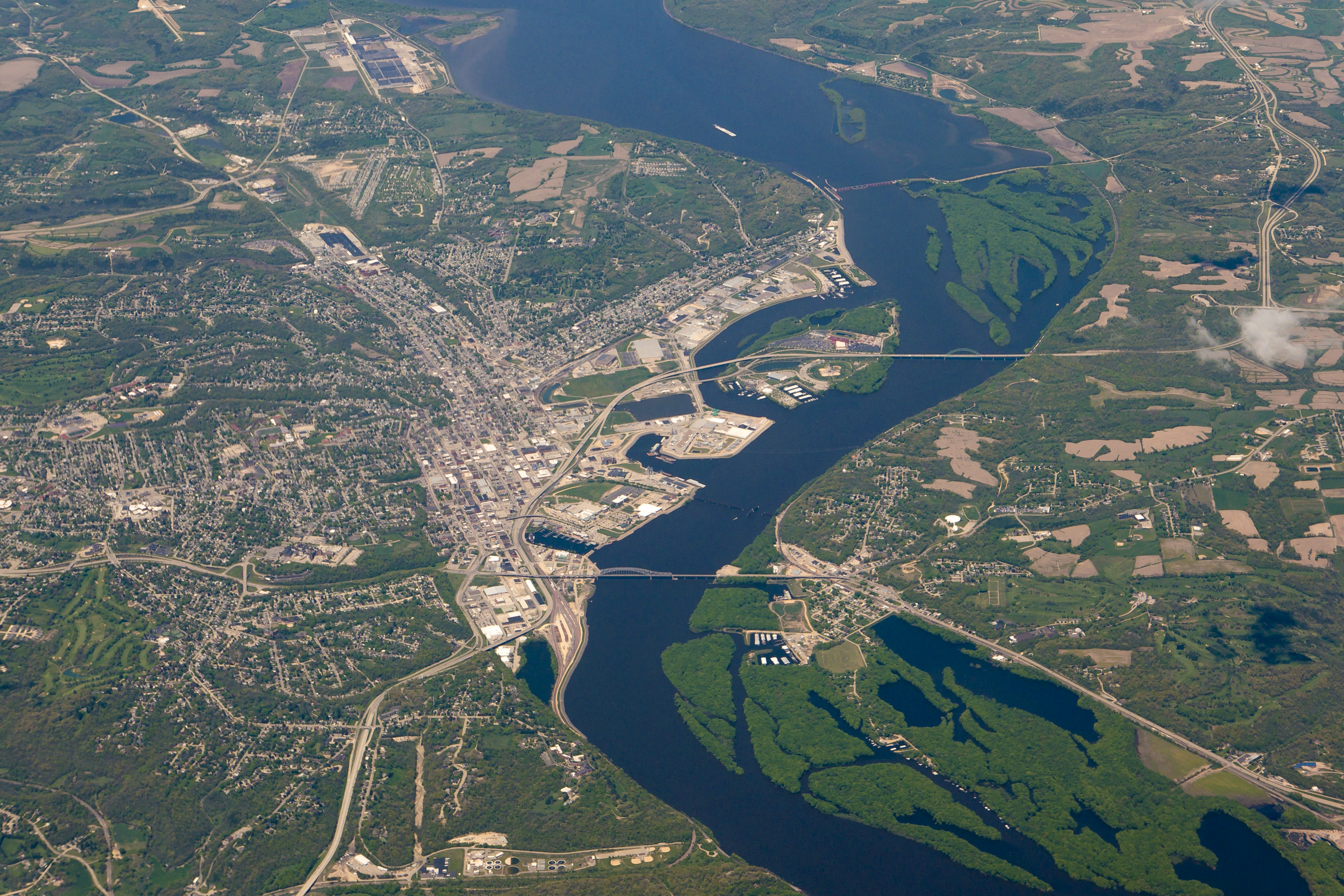
Aerial view of Dubuque and surrounding area

According to the United States Census Bureau, the city has a total area of 31.22 square miles (80.86 km^{2}), of which 29.97 square miles (77.62 km^{2}) are land and 1.25 square miles (3.24 km^{2}) are covered by water. Lake Peosta Channel separates Chaplain Schmitt Island from the mainland.

=== Neighborhoods ===
Downtown Dubuque is the city's central business district, housing many government and cultural institutions. It serves as the transportation and commercial hub, located along the Mississippi River in east-central Dubuque. Notable neighborhoods include Fenelon Place Residential Historic District, Jackson Park, Old Main Street and the Dubuque Millworking Historic District. The Port of Dubuque features the Grand Harbor Resort, Alliant Energy Amphitheater, and Grand River Center. Historic landmarks like the Shot Tower and the Dubuque County Courthouse reflect the city's regional importance.

The North End, settled by German immigrants in the late 19th century, remains a working-class area with factories and key sites including Bee Branch Creek, Eagle Point Park, Holy Ghost Catholic Church, Linwood Cemetery, Lock and Dam No. 11, Mathias Ham House and Sacred Heart Catholic Church. The South End, historically Irish American, features Irish pubs, churches, and neighborhoods with "old money" homes, including St. Pius X Seminary, St. Raphael's Cathedral, Mines of Spain State Recreation Area and the Wartburg Theological Seminary.

The West End, developed after World War II, is a suburban area that grew with the baby boom, featuring shopping centers like Plaza 20 and Kennedy Mall. It includes middle-class neighborhoods, parks, schools, and industrial areas, extending into the suburbs of Asbury and Peosta. Notable sites include the Dubuque Arboretum and Botanical Gardens and Emmaus University.

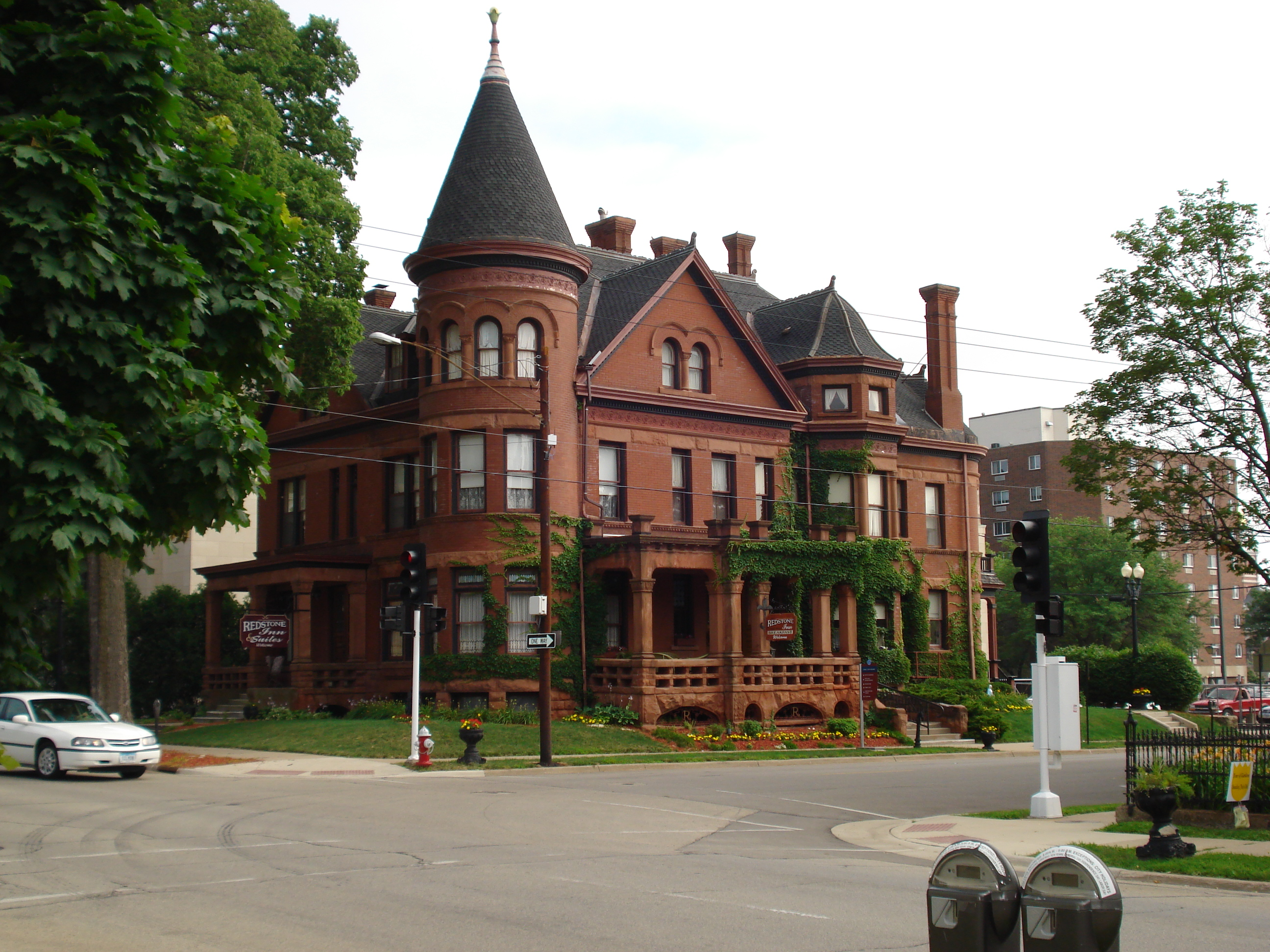
Redstone Bed & Breakfast

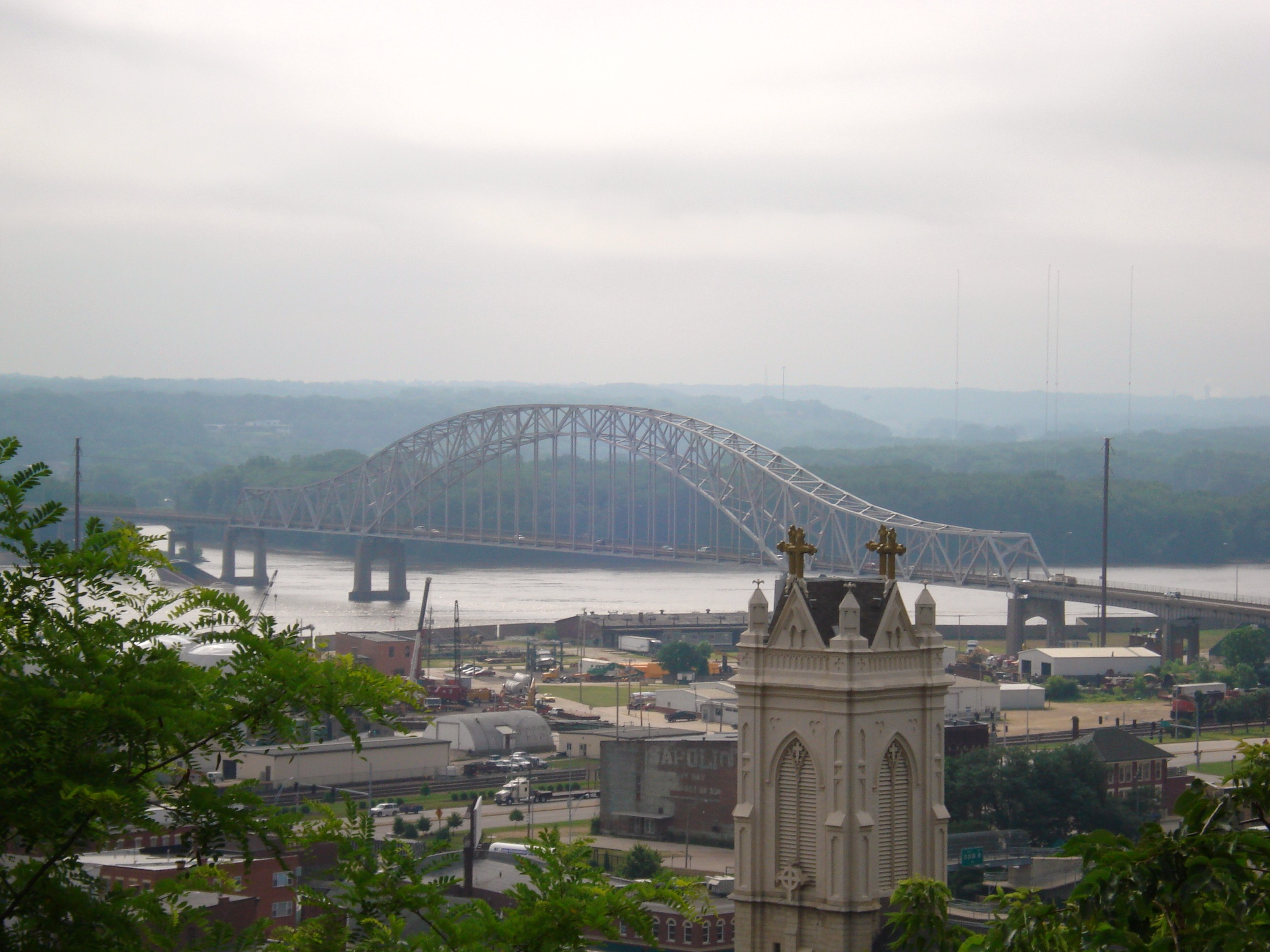
Mississippi River

=== Climate ===
Dubuque has a humid continental climate (Köppen Dfa), which gives it four distinct seasons. Spring is usually wet and rainy, summers are sunny and warm, autumn is mild, and winters are typically cloudy and snowy.

Climate data for Dubuque Regional Airport, 1991–2020 normals, (Note: Mean monthly maxima and minima (i.e. the expected highest and lowest temperature readings at any point during the year or given month) calculated based on data at said location from 1991 to 2020.) extremes 1873–present
Month	Jan	Feb	Mar	Apr	May	Jun	Jul	Aug	Sep	Oct	Nov	Dec	Year
Record high °F (°C)	63 (17)	71 (22)	86 (30)	93 (34)	104 (40)	104 (40)	110 (43)	107 (42)	99 (37)	90 (32)	78 (26)	69 (21)	110 (43)
Mean maximum °F (°C)	46.0 (7.8)	50.6 (10.3)	67.6 (19.8)	78.8 (26.0)	85.4 (29.7)	90.1 (32.3)	91.0 (32.8)	89.4 (31.9)	87.2 (30.7)	80.2 (26.8)	64.5 (18.1)	50.7 (10.4)	92.5 (33.6)
Mean daily maximum °F (°C)	26.5 (−3.1)	30.9 (−0.6)	44.1 (6.7)	57.7 (14.3)	69.2 (20.7)	78.5 (25.8)	81.5 (27.5)	79.6 (26.4)	72.9 (22.7)	59.9 (15.5)	44.8 (7.1)	31.8 (−0.1)	56.4 (13.6)
Daily mean °F (°C)	18.8 (−7.3)	22.9 (−5.1)	35.2 (1.8)	47.4 (8.6)	58.8 (14.9)	68.5 (20.3)	71.7 (22.1)	69.8 (21.0)	62.3 (16.8)	49.9 (9.9)	36.4 (2.4)	24.5 (−4.2)	47.2 (8.4)
Mean daily minimum °F (°C)	11.1 (−11.6)	15.0 (−9.4)	26.3 (−3.2)	37.2 (2.9)	48.5 (9.2)	58.6 (14.8)	62.0 (16.7)	60.0 (15.6)	51.8 (11.0)	39.9 (4.4)	28.1 (−2.2)	17.2 (−8.2)	38.0 (3.3)
Mean minimum °F (°C)	−12.7 (−24.8)	−6.0 (−21.1)	5.5 (−14.7)	22.4 (−5.3)	33.4 (0.8)	45.7 (7.6)	51.7 (10.9)	50.0 (10.0)	37.0 (2.8)	23.5 (−4.7)	10.7 (−11.8)	−4.5 (−20.3)	−17.0 (−27.2)
Record low °F (°C)	−32 (−36)	−31 (−35)	−20 (−29)	10 (−12)	21 (−6)	36 (2)	40 (4)	40 (4)	24 (−4)	10 (−12)	−17 (−27)	−25 (−32)	−32 (−36)
Average precipitation inches (mm)	1.32 (34)	1.57 (40)	2.25 (57)	4.06 (103)	4.30 (109)	5.19 (132)	4.80 (122)	3.95 (100)	3.82 (97)	2.93 (74)	2.21 (56)	1.80 (46)	38.20 (970)
Average snowfall inches (cm)	10.7 (27)	10.6 (27)	5.7 (14)	1.9 (4.8)	0.0 (0.0)	0.0 (0.0)	0.0 (0.0)	0.0 (0.0)	0.0 (0.0)	0.5 (1.3)	2.8 (7.1)	10.3 (26)	42.5 (108)
Average precipitation days (≥ 0.01 in)	9.1	8.9	10.1	11.4	13.0	12.2	9.7	9.0	8.7	8.9	8.3	9.1	118.4
Average snowy days (≥ 0.1 in)	7.8	6.9	4.2	1.3	0.0	0.0	0.0	0.0	0.0	0.5	2.4	6.3	29.4
Source: NOAA

== Demographics ==
Historical population
Year	Pop.	±%
1850	3,108	—
1860	13,000	+318.3%
1870	18,434	+41.8%
1880	25,254	+37.0%
1890	30,311	+20.0%
1900	36,297	+19.7%
1910	38,494	+6.1%
1920	39,141	+1.7%
1930	41,679	+6.5%
1940	43,892	+5.3%
1950	49,671	+13.2%
1960	56,606	+14.0%
1970	62,309	+10.1%
1980	62,374	+0.1%
1990	57,538	−7.8%
2000	57,686	+0.3%
2010	57,637	−0.1%
2020	59,667	+3.5%
Source: U.S. Decennial Census

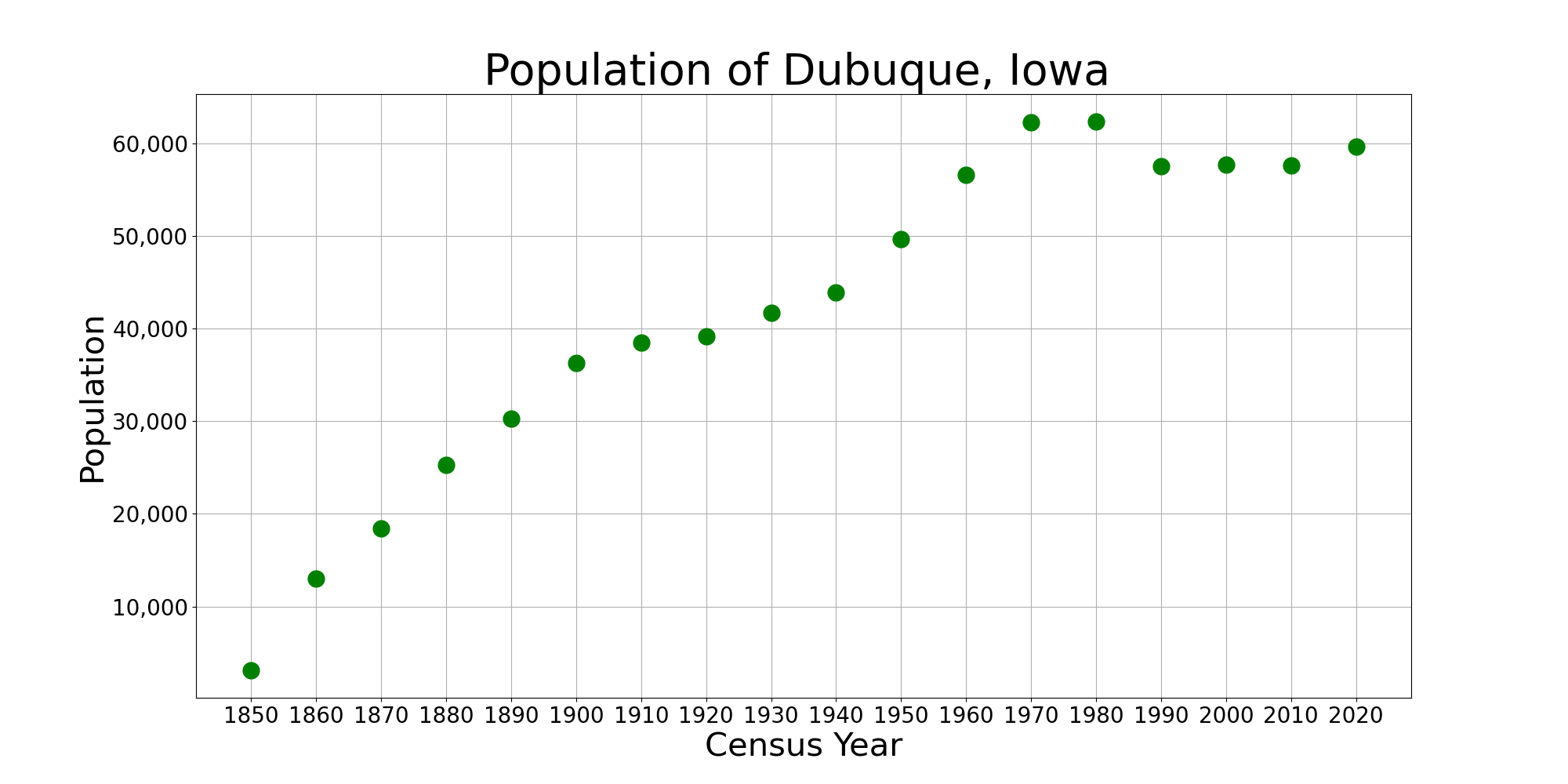
The population of Dubuque, Iowa from U.S. census data

=== 2020 census ===
As of the 2020 census, the population was 59,667. The population density was 1,930.5 inhabitants per square mile (745.4/km^{2}). There were 27,174 housing units at an average density of 879.2 per square mile (339.5/km^{2}), 7.5% of which were vacant; the homeowner vacancy rate was 1.5% and the rental vacancy rate was 10.5%.

The median age was 37.3 years. 20.5% of residents were under the age of 18 and 19.5% were 65 years of age or older. For every 100 females there were 96.3 males, and for every 100 females age 18 and over there were 94.5 males age 18 and over.

98.8% of residents lived in urban areas, while 1.2% lived in rural areas.

There were 25,127 households, of which 24.6% had children under the age of 18 living in them. Of all households, 39.1% were married-couple households, 22.3% were households with a male householder and no spouse or partner present, and 30.6% were households with a female householder and no spouse or partner present. About 36.3% of all households were made up of individuals and 14.2% had someone living alone who was 65 years of age or older.

Racial composition as of the 2020 census
Race	Number	Percent
White	50,794	85.1%
Black or African American	3,745	6.3%
American Indian and Alaska Native	223	0.4%
Asian	690	1.2%
Native Hawaiian and Other Pacific Islander	798	1.3%
Some other race	769	1.3%
Two or more races	2,648	4.4%
Hispanic or Latino (of any race)	2,220	3.7%

Non-Hispanic Whites comprised 83.8% of residents.

=== 2010 census ===
As of the census of 2010, there were 57,637 people, 23,506 households, and 13,888 families residing in the city. The population density was 1,923.2 inhabitants per square mile (742.6/km^{2}). There were 25,029 housing units at an average density of 835.1 per square mile (322.4/km^{2}). The racial makeup of the city was 91.7% White, 4.0% African American, 0.3% Native American, 1.1% Asian, 0.5% Pacific Islander, 0.6% from other races, and 1.8% from two or more races. Hispanic or Latino people of any race were 2.4% of the population.

There were 23,505 households, of which 27.4% had children under the age of 18 living with them, 43.6% were married couples living together, 11.1% had a female householder with no husband present, 4.3% had a male householder with no wife present, and 40.9% were non-families. 33.7% of all households were made up of individuals, and 12.7% had someone living alone who was 65 years of age or older. The average household size was 2.28 and the average family size was 2.92.

The median age in the city was 38 years. 21.4% of residents were under the age of 18; 13% were between the ages of 18 and 24; 23.3% were from 25 to 44; 25.9% were from 45 to 64; and 16.5% were 65 years of age or older. The gender makeup of the city was 48.4% male and 51.6% female.

=== 2000 census ===
As of the census of 2000, there were 57,686 people, 22,560 households, and 14,303 families residing in the city. The population density was 2,178.2 inhabitants per square mile (841.0/km^{2}). There were 23,819 housing units at an average density of 899.4 per square mile (347.3/km^{2}). The racial makeup of the city was 96.15% White, 1.21% Black or African American, 0.19% Native American, 0.68% Asian, 0.11% Pacific Islander, 0.69% from other races, and 0.96% from two or more races. 1.58% of the population were Hispanic or Latino of any race.

There were 22,560 households, out of which 30.0% had children under the age of 18 living with them, 50.3% were married couples living together, 10.0% had a female householder with no husband present, and 36.6% were non-families. 31.0% of all households were made up of individuals, and 12.6% had someone living alone who was 65 years of age or older. The average household size was 2.37 and the average family size was 2.99.

Age spread: 23.6% under the age of 18, 11.8% from 18 to 24, 26.5% from 25 to 44, 21.6% from 45 to 64, and 16.5% who were 65 years of age or older. The median age was 37 years. For every 100 females, there were 90.0 males. For every 100 females age 18 and over, there were 86.2 males.

The median income for a household in the city was $36,785, and the median income for a family was $46,564. Males had a median income of $31,543 versus $22,565 for females. The per capita income for the city was $19,616. About 5.5% of families and 9.5% of the population were below the poverty line, including 9.3% of those under age 18 and 12.5% of those age 65 or over.

=== Religion ===
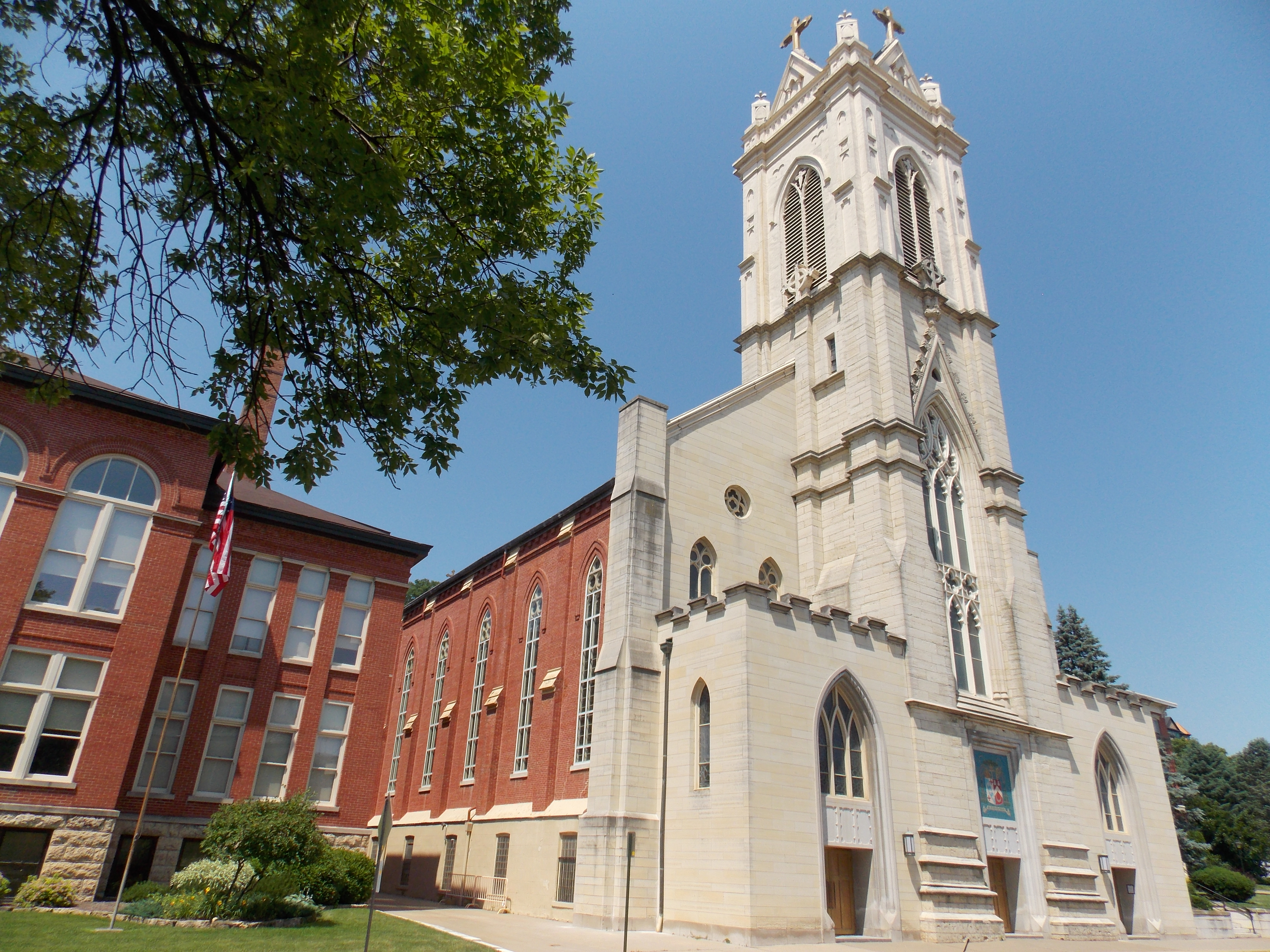
Saint Raphael's Cathedral is the oldest Christian congregation in Iowa.

Local Catholic settlers established St. Raphael's Cathedral in 1833. The city also played a key role in the expansion of the Catholic Church into the Western United States, as it was the administrative center for Catholics in Iowa, Minnesota, North Dakota, and South Dakota. Many important Catholic religious leaders have lived in Dubuque, including its first bishop Mathias Loras, Fr. Samuel Mazzuchelli, Clement Smyth, and Mother Mary Frances Clarke, BVM. Catholic parishes around the city include Saint Raphael's, Saint Mary's, Sacred Heart, Holy Ghost, Saint Patrick's, Saint Joseph the Worker, Resurrection, Saint Columbkille's, and Saint Anthony's.

In 2010, Catholic adherents who regularly attended services made up about 53-percent of Dubuque County residents. This contrasts with Iowa as a whole, which was about 17% Catholic in 2010. Five religious colleges, four area convents, and a nearby abbey and monastery add to the city's religious importance.

The city proper is home to 52 different churches: 11 Catholic, 40 Protestant, an Eastern Orthodox, a Jewish synagogue, and a mosque. Most of non-Catholic population in the city belongs to various Protestant denominations. Dubuque is home to three theological seminaries: St. Pius X Seminary, a college seminary for Catholic men discerning a call to ordained priesthood; the University of Dubuque Theological Seminary, with the Presbyterian Church USA; and the Wartburg Theological Seminary with the Evangelical Lutheran Church in America. The University of Dubuque and Wartburg train both lay and ordained ministers for placements in churches nationwide.

Ben Jacobs of The New Republic described Dubuque as "one of the most Catholic areas in" the United States.

=== Ethnic groups ===
Several Marshallese immigrants coming to attend a seminary program in the city in the 1970s were the start of the city's Marshallese population. Circa 2024, the number of ethnic Marshallese in the Dubuque area numbered about 1,400.

== Economy ==
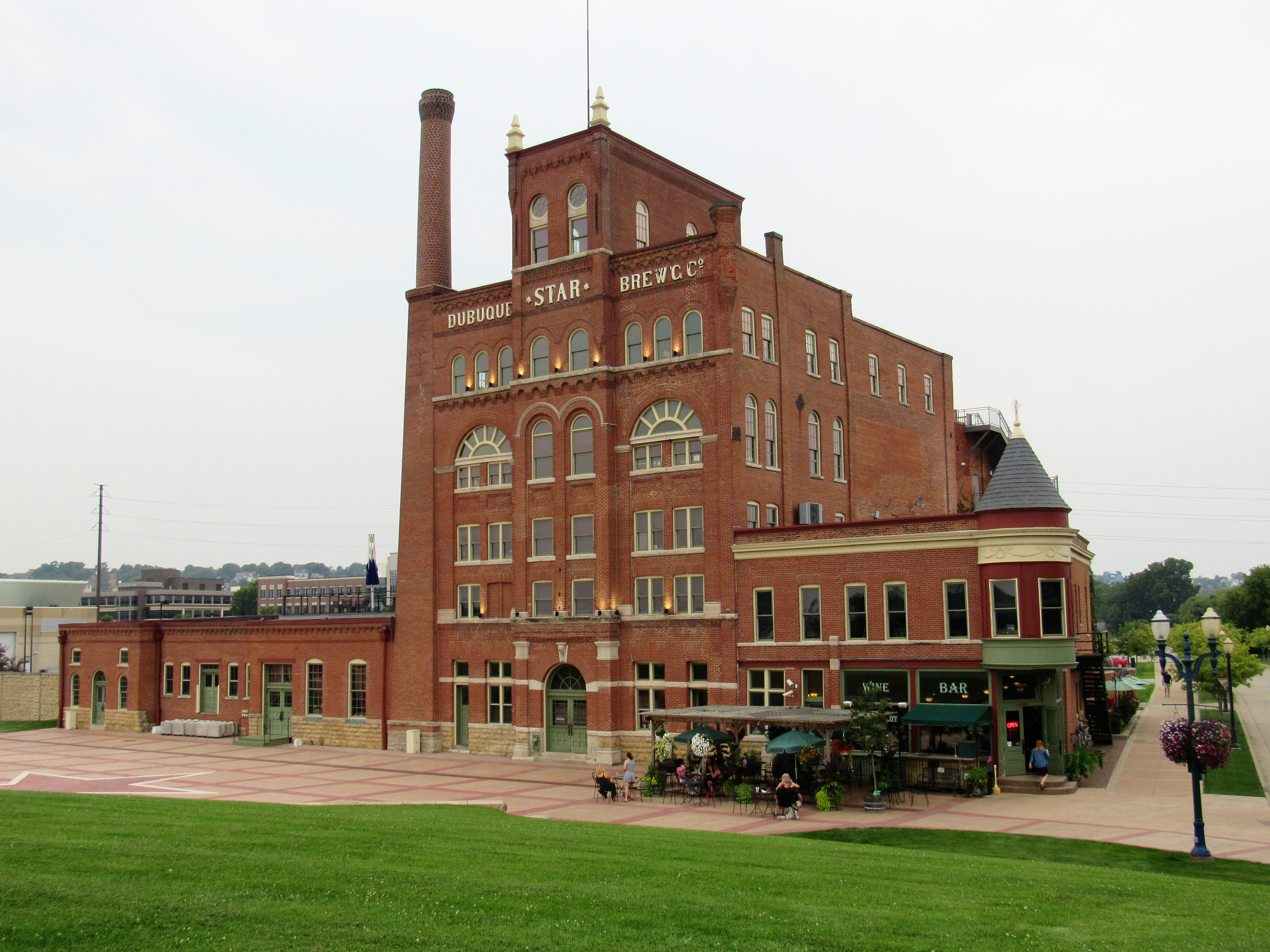
The Dubuque Star Brewery building

Dubuque's economy was traditionally centered on manufacturing companies such as John Deere and Flexsteel Industries. While industry still plays a major role in the city, the 2000s saw economic diversification with the city outpacing the state in job growth. In 2022, Ben Jacobs of The New Republic wrote "Dubuque has weathered the economic transformations of the late twentieth century comparatively well."

Dubuque's largest employers include:

- John Deere (2,600)
- Dubuque Community School District (1,957)
- MercyOne Dubuque Medical Center (1,410)
- Medical Associates (1,061)
- Finley Hospital (975)
- Andersen Windows & Doors (900 est.)
- City of Dubuque (737)
- Sedgwick Claims Management Services (725)
- Cottingham & Butler (715)
- Medline Industries (500)

Other companies with a large presence in the area include Holy Family Catholic Schools, Prudential Financial, Diamond Jo Dubuque casino, University of Dubuque, A.Y. McDonald Manufacturing, Dubuque County, Dupaco Community Credit Union, Loras College, and DuTrac Community Credit Union.

== Arts and culture ==
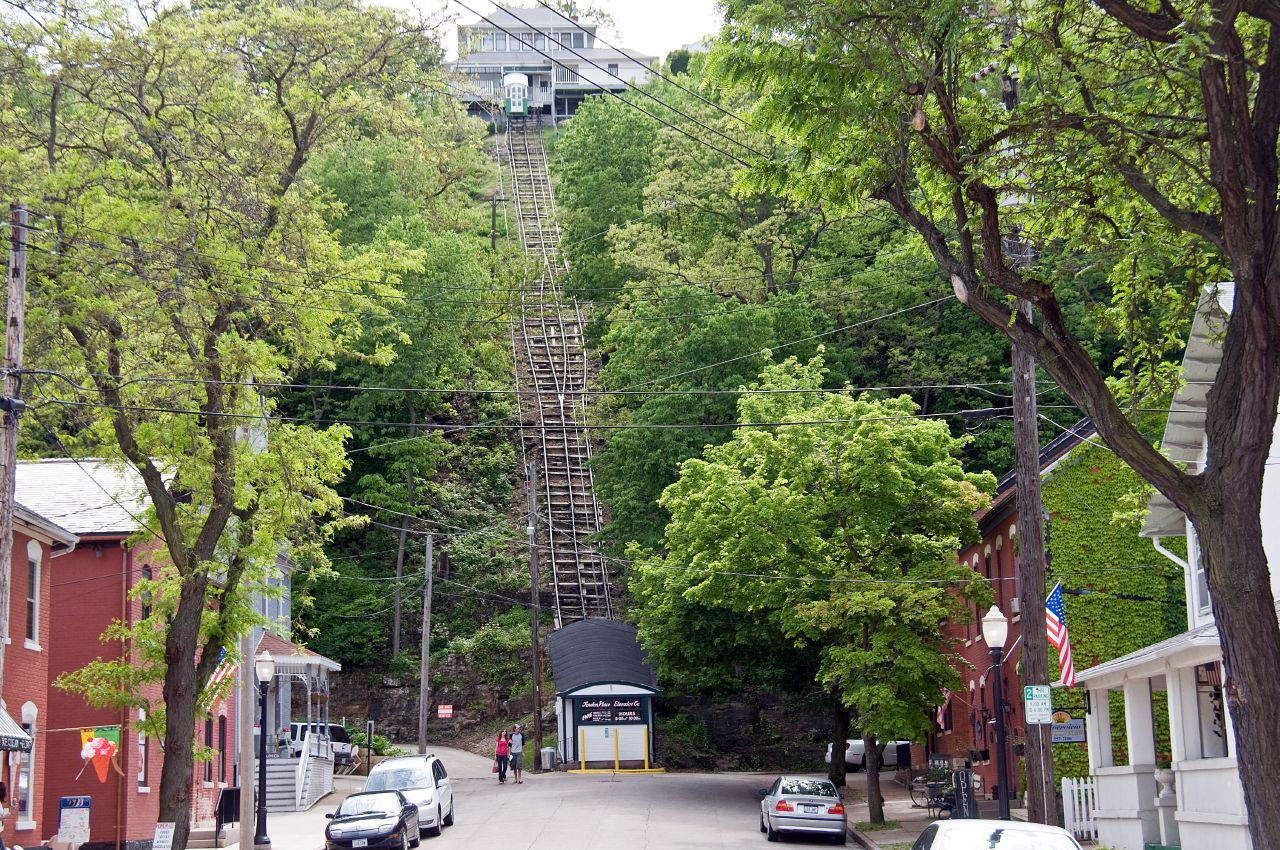
Fenelon Place Elevator

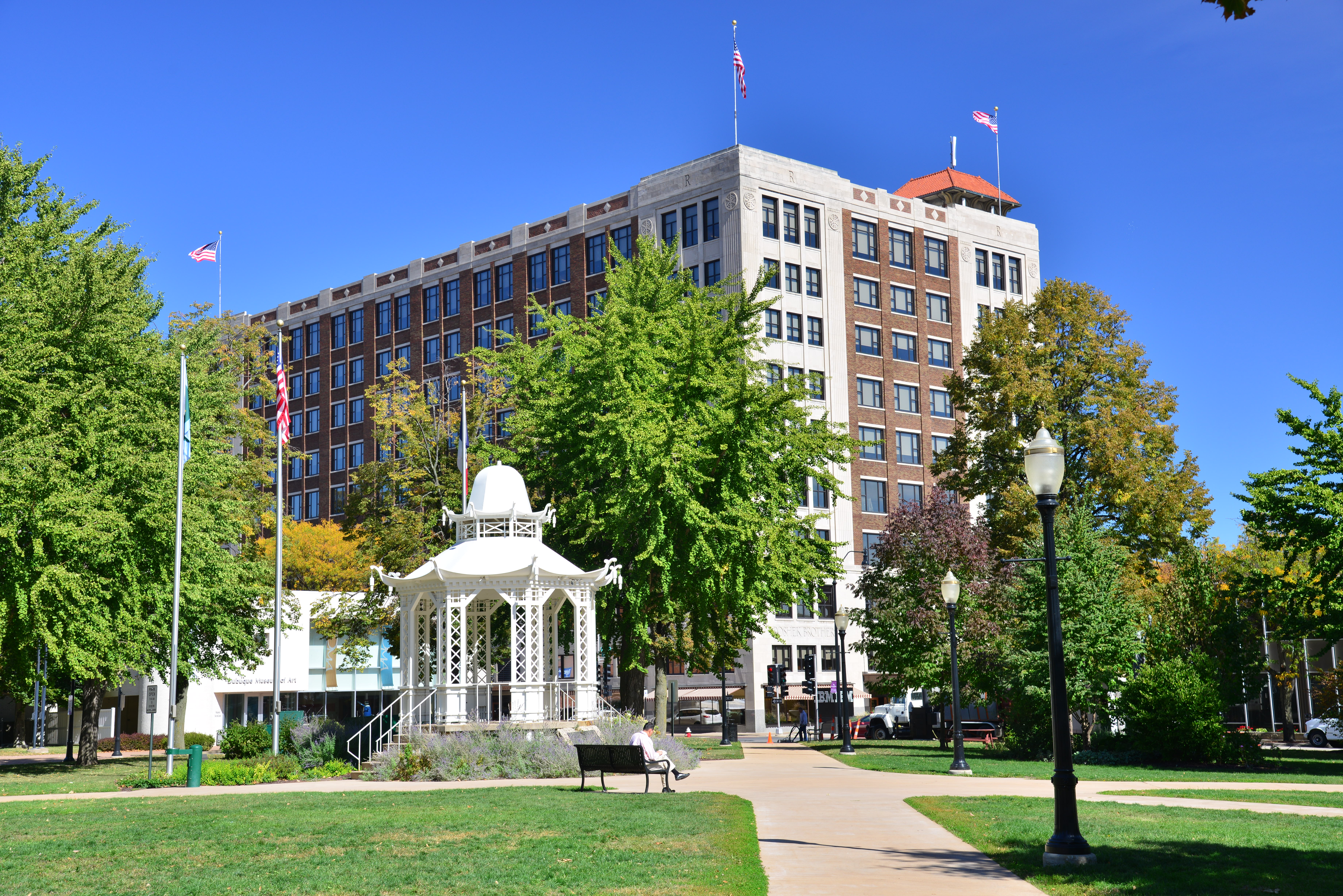
Washington Park

Dubuque is culturally part of the Upper Midwest. The National Mississippi River Museum & Aquarium is home to museum exhibits on the culture and history of America's rivers, as well as aquariums featuring wildlife found in the Mississippi River and Gulf of Mexico.

The Dubuque Arboretum and Botanical Gardens is a 56 acres (230,000 m^{2}) arboretum and botanical gardens established in 1980. Another notable landmark is the Fenelon Place Elevator located in downtown Dubuque. It is a funicular railway that transports passengers up and down one of the city's towering bluffs; the current funicular was built in 1893. Portions of Iowa, Illinois, and Wisconsin can all be seen from the elevator's observation decks.

The Dubuque Museum of Art includes a significant collection by Grant Wood.

The Dubuque County Courthouse, with its striking Beaux-Arts architecture, is listed on the National Register of Historic Places. The Five Flags Center, built in 1910 and designed by George L. Rapp, holds the distinction of being a National Historic Landmark. Dubuque's Shot Tower, one of the few remaining of its kind used to produce lead shot, is also recognized as a National Historic Landmark.

The Mathias Ham House, a 19th-century home situated at the intersection of Shiras and Lincoln Avenues, is also listed on the National Register. This historic site offers tours, events, and group programs throughout the year. The Grand Opera House, designed by Willoughby James Edbrooke and completed in 1890, stands as his only surviving opera house, showcasing the Richardsonian Romanesque style. It was added to the National Register of Historic Places in 2002. The Julien Dubuque Bridge, another National Historic Landmark, was built in 1943 across the Mississippi River.

Dubuque has several notable parks, particularly Eagle Point Park and the Mines of Spain State Recreation Area. Eagle Point is mostly situated on a bluff that overlooks the Mississippi River and the Lock and Dam No. 11. Mines of Spain includes hiking trails and archaeological sites from an early lead mining venture led by Julien Dubuque, as well as Dubuque's gravesite. Dubuque's waterfront features the Ice Harbor and, just north of it, the Diamond Jo Dubuque casino and Grand River Event Center. Linwood Cemetery is the resting place of many notable figures.

Dubuque is the home of the Colts Drum and Bugle Corps. The Colts are a Drum Corps International World Class ensemble and tour the country each summer to attend competitions. Each summer, the Colts and Dubuque host "Music on the March", a Drum Corps International-sanctioned marching competition at Dubuque Senior High School.

The arts organization Voices Productions spearheaded a project to display large murals by street artists Gaia, Werc, and Gera and others in downtown Dubuque. So far over 30 murals have been painted. The original concept for the project was developed by Sam Mulgrew, Gene Tully and Wendy Rolfe.

== Sports ==
The city is home to the Dubuque Fighting Saints, who compete in the United States Hockey League at Tier I Junior A. The team plays at ImOn Arena. Dubuque was home to the original Fighting Saints team from 1980 to 2001, when the team relocated to Tulsa, Oklahoma. From 2001 to 2010, the Dubuque Thunderbirds replaced the Fighting Saints playing in the Tier III Junior A Central States Hockey League at the Five Flags Center.

Dubuque was home to Union Dubuque F.C., which played in the United Premier Soccer League and Midwest Premier League. The club folded following the 2021 season.

== Government ==
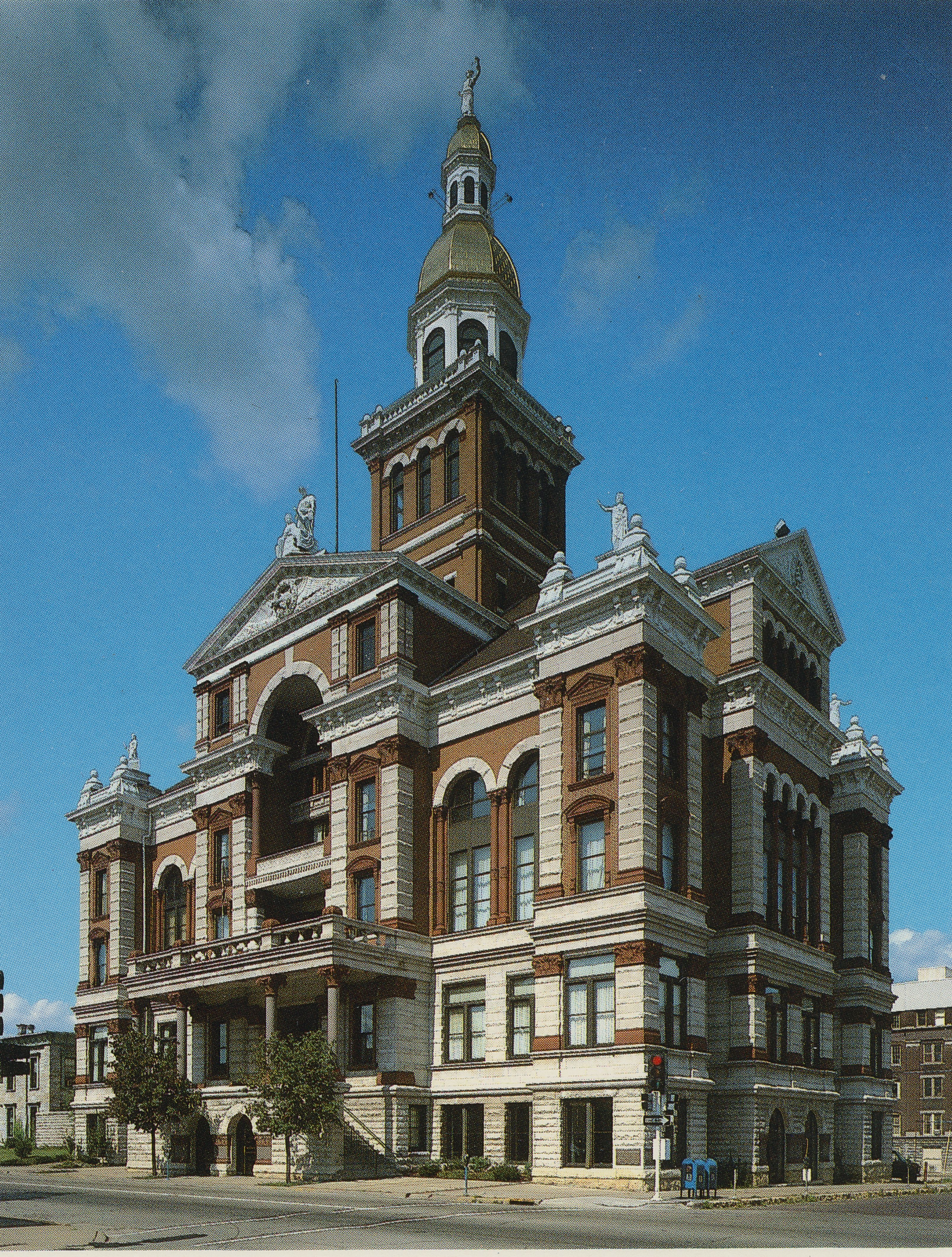
Dubuque County Courthouse

The City of Dubuque operates on the council-manager form of government, employing a full-time city manager and part-time city council. The city manager, Michael C. Van Milligen, runs the day-to-day operations of the city, and serves as the city's executive leader.

Dubuque has been using its city-owned Community Broadband Network to become a smart city. In 2014, city government officials created four apps to monitor data related to water use, electricity use, transit patterns, and waste recycling efforts. The City of Dubuque Sustainability Coordinator, Cori Burbach, stated this was "for educating citizens and implementing behavior changes that they control based on the data these applications provide". However, Dubuque has been reaching the limits of its network and lack sufficient services from giant providers.

Policy and financial decisions are made by the city council, which serves as the city's legislative body. The council comprises the mayor, Brad Cavanaugh, who serves as its chairman, 4 ward-elected members, and 2 at-large members. The city council members are: Susan R. Farber (Ward 1), Laura Roussell (Ward 2), Danny Sprank (Ward 3), Katy Wethal (Ward 4), Ric W. Jones (at-large), and David T. Resnick (at-large). The city council meets at 6 P.M. on the first and third Mondays of every month in the council chamber of the Historic Federal Building. The city is divided into 4 electoral wards and 21 precincts, as stated in Chapter 17 of the Dubuque City Code.

In the 89th Iowa General Assembly, Dubuque is represented by Senators Thomas Townsend (D) for Senate District 36 and Carrie Koelker (R) for Senate District 33 in the Iowa Senate, and Representatives Jennifer Smith (R) for House District 72, Shannon Lundgren (R) for House District 65, and Lindsay James (D) for House District 71 in the Iowa House of Representatives.

At the federal level in the 117th Congress, it is within Iowa's 2nd congressional district, represented by Ashley Hinson (R) in the U.S. House of Representatives. Dubuque, and all of Iowa are represented by U.S. Senators Chuck Grassley (R) and Joni Ernst (R).

City Council of Dubuque, Iowa
Area	Name
Mayor	Brad Cavanaugh
At-Large	David Resnick
At-Large	Ric Jones
First Ward	Susan Farber
Second Ward	Laura Roussell
Third Ward	Danny Sprank
Fourth Ward	Katy Wethal

=== Political climate ===
For most of its history, Dubuque has been mostly Democratic due to the large numbers of working-class people and Catholics living in the city. At times, Dubuque was called "The State of Dubuque" because the political climate in Dubuque was very different from the rest of Iowa.

However, at the turn of the twentieth century, the United States Congress was led by two Dubuque Republicans. Representative David B. Henderson ascended to Speaker of the U.S. House of Representatives in 1899, at the same time Senator William B. Allison served as Chairman of the Senate Republican Conference. Dubuque has experienced a shift toward the Republican party in the 2010s.

== Education ==
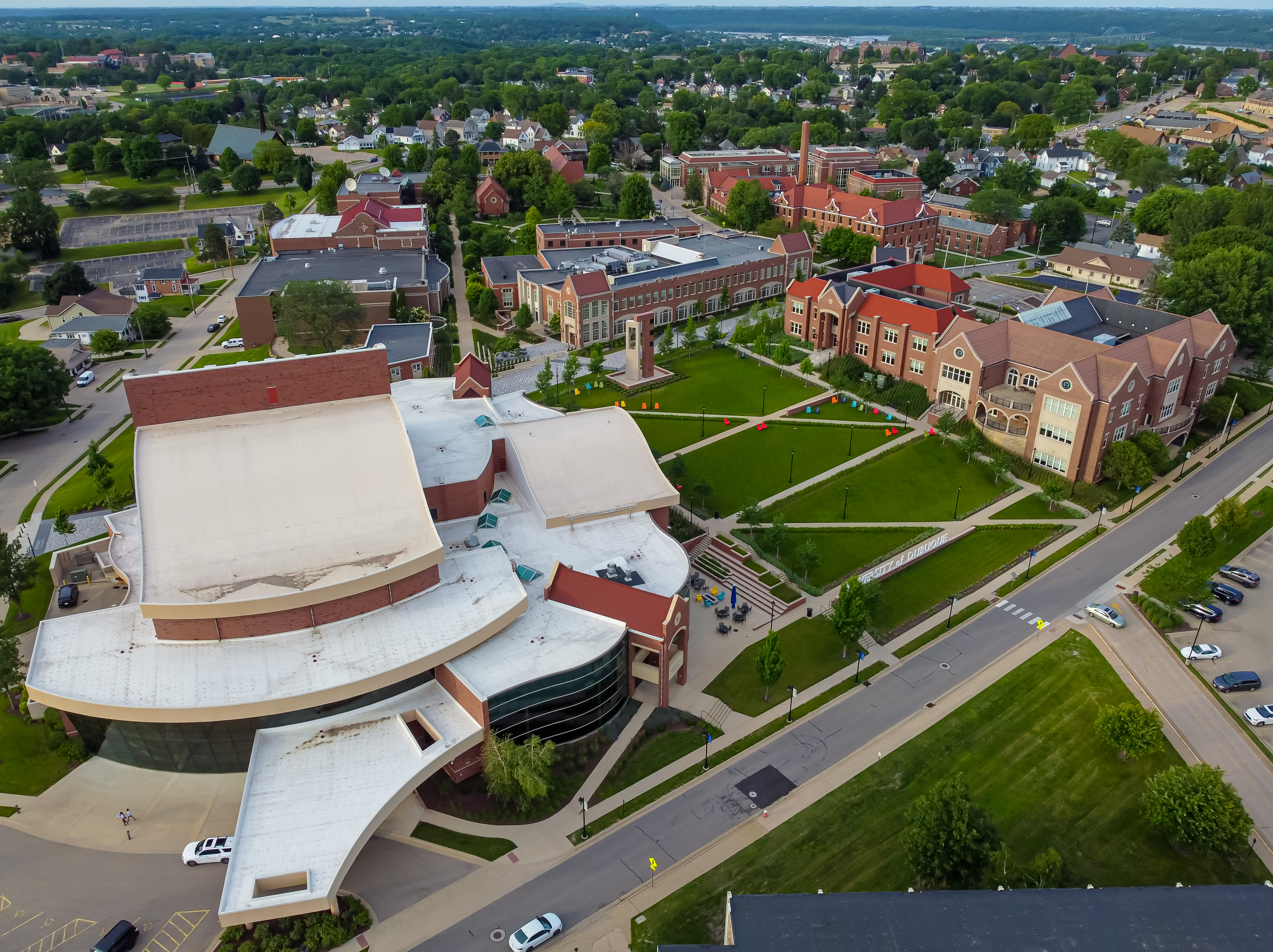
University of Dubuque campus

=== Primary and secondary ===
Dubuque is served by the Dubuque Community School District, which covers roughly the eastern half of Dubuque County and enrolled 10,735 students in 20 school buildings in 2006. The district has 13 elementary schools, three middle schools, two high schools, and one preschool complex. Public high schools in Dubuque include Dubuque Senior High School and Hempstead High School.

The city has a large number of students who attend private schools. All Catholic schools are run by the Roman Catholic Archdiocese of Dubuque. The Archdiocese oversees the Holy Family Catholic Schools, which operates 11 schools in the city, including nine early childhood programs, four elementary schools (one of which is a Spanish immersion program), one middle school, and one high school, Wahlert Catholic High School. As of 2006, Holy Family Catholic Schools enrolled 1,954 students in grades K-12. Dubuque also had one Lutheran Church – Missouri Synod affiliated elementary school, the Dubuque Lutheran School. It closed in 2019.

=== Higher education ===
Dubuque is home to several higher education institutions. Loras College and Clarke University are two four-year colleges operated by the Roman Catholic Archdiocese of Dubuque. Protestant colleges in the city include the University of Dubuque, which is associated with the Presbyterian Church (USA), and Emmaus University, connected with the Plymouth Brethren movement.

Three theological seminaries operate in the city: St. Pius X Seminary (Roman Catholic, associated with Loras College), the University of Dubuque Theological Seminary (Presbyterian), and Wartburg Theological Seminary (Lutheran).

Other post-secondary schools in the area include Northeast Iowa Community College, which operates its largest campus in nearby Peosta, Iowa and has a satellite campus in Dubuque; the Roman Catholic Divine Word College missions seminary in nearby Epworth, Iowa; and Capri Cosmetology College in Dubuque.

== Media ==
=== Print ===
The Telegraph Herald, a local newspaper, had a daily circulation of nearly 31,000 as of January 27, 2007. Other papers and journals operating in the city include Tri-State Business Times (monthly business paper), 365ink Magazine (biweekly alt/cultural magazine), Julien's Journal (monthly lifestyle magazine), the Dubuque Advertiser (advertisement paper), and the "Tri-States Sports Look" (local sports publication).

=== Radio ===
==== AM radio stations ====
- KDTH 1370 "Voice of the Tri-States", news/talk
- WDBQ 1490 "News, Talk, & Sports Leader", news/talk/sports

==== FM radio stations ====
- WJTY 88.1 "Joy 88", Christian
- KIAD 88.5, Christian
- KNSY 89.7 "IPR News/Studio One", Iowa Public Radio
- KUNI 90.9 "KUNI Radio", Iowa Public Radio
- KATF 92.9 "Kat-FM", adult contemporary
- K240DZ 95.9 "Augustana Public Radio", public radio
- KGRR 97.3 "97.3 The Rock", active rock
- WGLR 97.7 "97.7 Country", country
- KCRD 98.3, Catholic
- WVRE 101.1 "The River", country
- K269EK 101.7 "Classical Music and More", Iowa Public Radio
- KXGE 102.3 "Eagle 102", classic rock
- WJOD 103.3 "New Country 103", country
- KLYV 105.3 "Today's Hit Music Y105", Top 40
- KIYX 106.1 "Superhits 106", classic hits
- WPVL 107.1 "Xtreme 107.1", Top 40
- WDBQ-FM 107.5 "Q107.5", classic hits

=== Television ===
Dubuque and surrounding areas are in the Cedar Rapids/Waterloo/Dubuque broadcast media market, which is monitored by the A.C. Nielsen Company for audience research data for advertisers. Dubuque formerly had a local TV news station, KFXA/KFXB Fox 28/40. In 2004, that station became an affiliate of CTN dropping all local programming leaving Dubuque without a local television newsroom. Dubuque is covered by local news bureaus of Cedar Rapids/Waterloo based affiliates. They are KCRG (ABC affiliate) and KWWL (NBC Affiliate).

== Infrastructure ==
=== Transportation ===
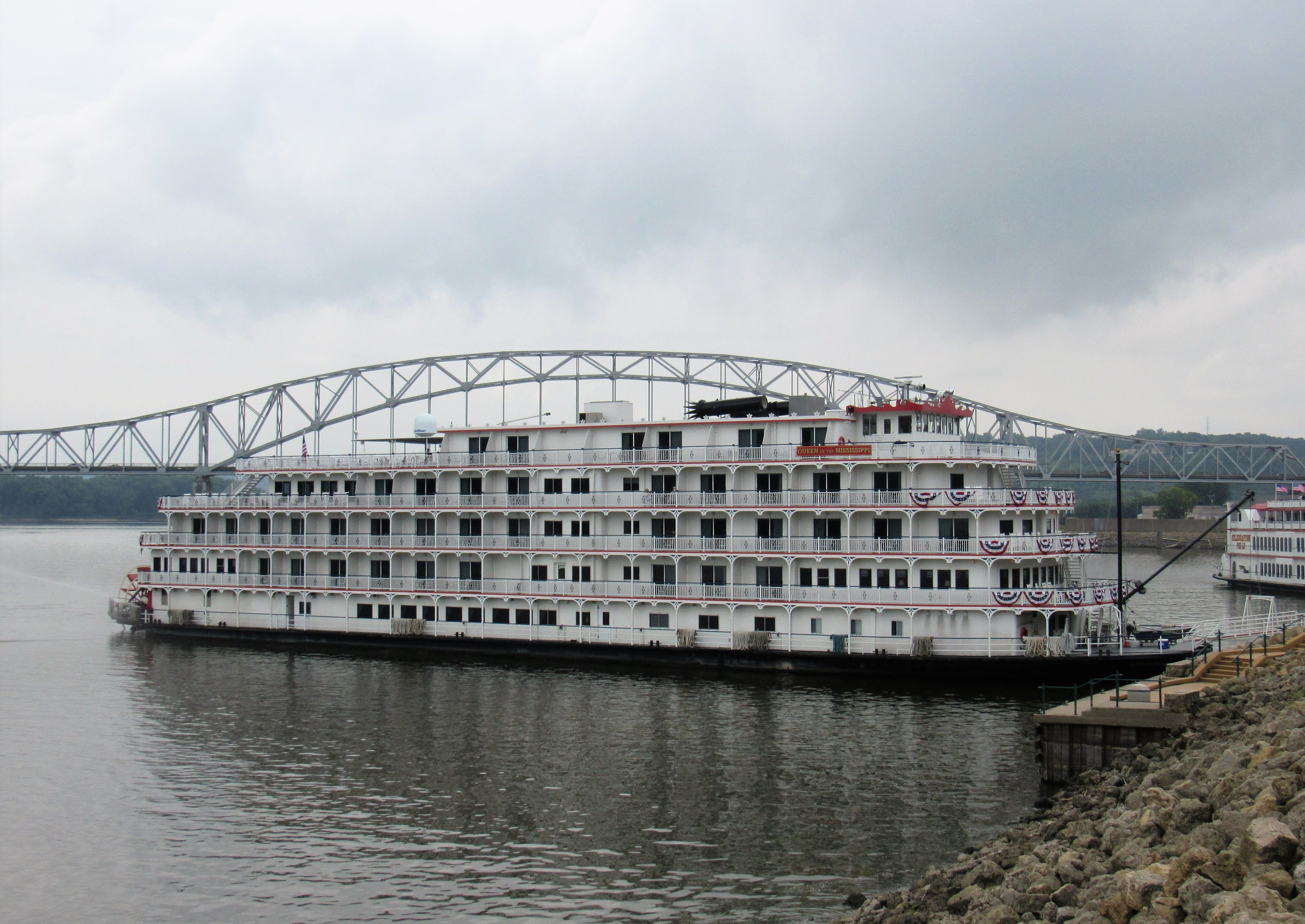
Queen of the Mississippi docked at Dubuque

The Dubuque Intermodal Transportation Center serves as the primary intercity bus hub in Dubuque. Burlington Trailways and Lamers Bus Lines both serve the city. Dubuque was served by passenger rail until 1981; as of 2022, only the freight railroads Canadian National and Canadian Pacific serve the city.

==== Airport ====
Dubuque and its region are served by the general-aviation Dubuque Regional Airport (IATA: DBQ, ICAO: KDBQ). The airport has one carrier, Denver Air Connection, which operates one daily flight to Chicago O'Hare. Several other airlines, mostly regional carriers, have historically served DBQ including Northwest Airlink, American Eagle, Avelo, and several smaller regional carriers. DBQ also serves general aviation and cargo traffic for the Dubuque area.

Dubuque has also been formally served by several other airports, including one located on Chaplain Schmitt Island.

==== Highways ====
Dubuque is served by four U.S. Highways (20, 151, 61 and 52) and one state highway (3). Highway 20 going east, connects into Illinois over the Julien Dubuque Bridge. In the west, it connects to Waterloo. Highways 151 and 61 run north–south through the city, with a shared expressway for part of the route. Highways 52 and 61 both connect Dubuque with the Twin Cities (Minnesota) to the north, with 61 connecting to Davenport, and 52 connecting to Bellevue to the south and then Clinton via U.S. Route 67. Highway 151 connects Dubuque with Madison, Wisconsin (via the Dubuque–Wisconsin Bridge) to the northeast and Cedar Rapids to the southwest.

Iowa State Highway 3 begins in Dubuque, connecting the city with central and western Iowa. The four-lane divided Northwest Arterial (former Iowa State Highway 32) acts as a beltway for parts of the North End and West Side, connecting Highways 3 and 20. Less than two miles (3.2 km) from the junction of the Northwest Arterial and Highway 20, the Southwest Arterial is a 6.1-mile (9.8 km) expressway carrying Highway 52 southeast from Highway 20 to Highways 151 and 61 near Key West and the Dubuque Regional Airport.

==== Public transit ====
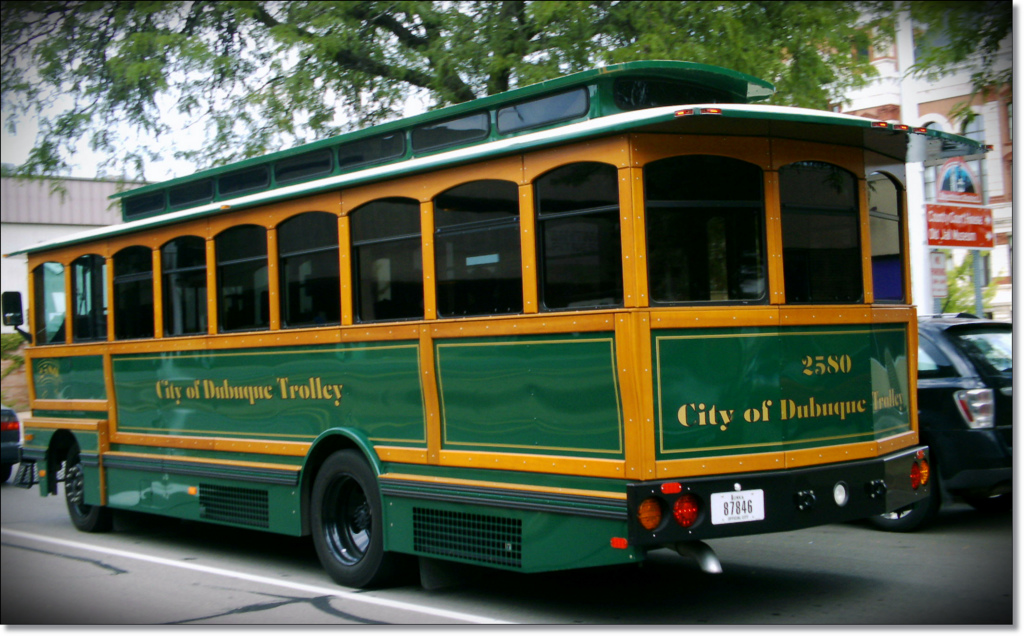
City of Dubuque Trolley

In Dubuque, public transportation is provided by the city transit division The Jule. The Jule operates multiple bus routes and on-demand paratransit Minibus service throughout the city. The routes are based out of one or more of the three transfer locations and run in 30-minute loops. These loops serve neighborhoods, shopping areas, medical offices, and industrial parks and provide connections to other areas of the city with the 15-minute cross-town Express route. The system's three major transfer stations are Downtown Intermodal (9th & Elm St), Midtown (North Grandview & University Avenues), and the West End (Kennedy Circle/John F. Kennedy Road).

=== Healthcare ===
Dubuque is the regional health care center of the Tri-State area. On March 15, 2012, the Commonwealth Fund released its first Scorecard on Local Health System Performance; it ranked Dubuque second in the nation. The city is home to two major hospitals that, together, have 421 beds. Mercy Medical Center - Dubuque is the largest hospital in the city with 263 beds. Mercy specializes in various cardiac-related treatments, among other things, and is affiliated with Trinity Health, one of the largest Catholic health delivery system in the United States.

Dubuque's other hospital is The Finley Hospital, which is a member of UnityPoint Health's network of hospitals. Finley is JCAHO accredited, and has 126 beds. Finley includes the Wendt Regional Cancer Center.

Among other healthcare facilities, the city is home to two major outpatient clinics. Medical Associates Clinic is the oldest multi-specialty group practice clinic in Iowa, and currently operates two outpatient clinics in Dubuque, its "East" and "West" campuses. It is affiliated with Mercy Medical Center — Dubuque, and also operates its own HMO, Medical Associates Health Plans. Affiliated with the Finley Hospital is Dubuque Internal Medicine, which as of 2007 was Iowa's largest internal medicine group practice clinic. Another major outpatient Clinic In Dubuque was Grand River Medical Group that merged With Unity Point Health on May 4, 2025.

== In popular culture ==
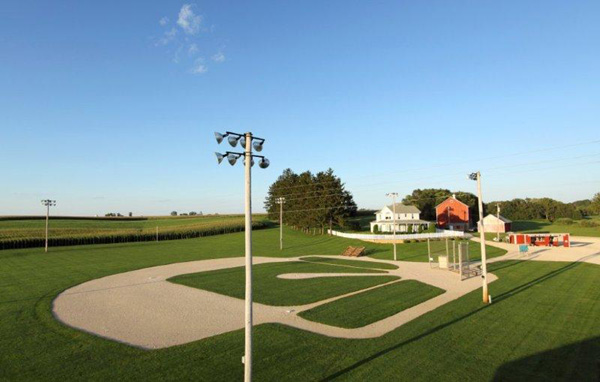
The Field of Dreams, west of Dubuque

Dubuque is home to the Julien Dubuque Film Festival held every April. Several movies have been filmed in and around Dubuque, including:

- F.I.S.T. (1978), loosely based on the Teamsters union and their former President Jimmy Hoffa.
- Take This Job and Shove It (1981), a comedy based on the true story of Dubuque Star Brewery after Joseph Pickett acquired the brewery.
- Various scenes in Field of Dreams (1989); most of the filming, and the actual field from the movie, were in nearby Dyersville.
- The popular YouTube video titled "Rappin' For Jesus", was uploaded on February 13, 2013, by Brian Spinney. This video features a Pastor Jim Colerick and his Wife, Mary Sue, singing a rap style song preaching Christianity for a Youth Outreach Program. The Church mentioned was listed as the "West Dubuque 2nd Church of Christ", which was found to not exist, and the video was determined to be a hoax.

== See also ==
- First National Bank of Dubuque
- Parks in Dubuque, Iowa
