= KATF =

- Dubuque, Iowa; United States
- Broadcast area: Tri-States (Wisconsin, Iowa, Illinois)
- Frequency: 92.9 MHz
- Branding: 92.9 Kat FM

Programming
- Format: Adult contemporary
- Affiliations: Fox News Radio

Ownership
- Owner: Radio Dubuque, Inc.
- Sister stations: KDTH, KGRR, WVRE

History
- First air date: June 25, 1967 (as KFMD)
- Former call signs: KFMD (1967–1984)
- Call sign meaning: "Kat FM"

Technical information
- Licensing authority: FCC
- Facility ID: 73661
- Class: C1
- ERP: 100,000 watts
- HAAT: 309 metres (1,014 feet)
- Transmitter coordinates: 42°31′44″N 90°36′58.5″W

Links
- Public license information: Public file; LMS
- Webcast: Listen live
- Website: www.radiodubuque.com/katfm/

KATF (92.9 FM) is a radio station broadcasting an adult contemporary format. Licensed to serve the Dubuque, Iowa, United States, area, the station is owned by Radio Dubuque, Inc., and features programming from Fox News Radio. Its transmitter is located across the Mississippi River from the northern part of downtown Dubuque in southwestern Grant County, Wisconsin. KATF formerly had the call letters KFMD.

Radio Dubuque also hosts Dubuque's 4th of July celebration, and many local events such as chili-cookoffs, outdoor concerts, and live broadcasts.

KATF is the most powerful radio station in the Dubuque market and while all Dubuque radio stations cover the tri-states of Iowa, Illinois, and Wisconsin, KATF's signal can also be heard in the far southeastern corner of Minnesota, thereby adding a fourth state to the fringes of the FM station's coverage area.
