= KGRR =

- Epworth, Iowa; United States
- Broadcast area: Dubuque, Iowa
- Frequency: 97.3 MHz
- Branding: 97.3 The Rock

Programming
- Format: Active rock
- Affiliations: Compass Media Networks

Ownership
- Owner: Radio Dubuque, Inc.
- Sister stations: KDTH, KATF, WVRE

History
- First air date: December 10, 1994
- Call sign meaning: "Great Rock 'n Roll"

Technical information
- Licensing authority: FCC
- Facility ID: 26898
- Class: C3
- ERP: 25,000 watts
- HAAT: 100 m (330 ft)
- Transmitter coordinates: 42°27′29″N 90°46′40.5″W

Links
- Public license information: Public file; LMS
- Webcast: Listen live
- Website: www.radiodubuque.com/therock/

KGRR (97.3 FM) is a radio station broadcasting an active rock format to the Dubuque, Iowa, United States, area. The station is licensed to Radio Dubuque, Inc. Its transmitter is located alongside U.S. Highway 20 between Dubuque and Peosta on top of the U.S. 20 Bluff. KGRR was used as the radio station call letters in an episode of 'The Twilight Zone' Nightsong (TV episode 1986 #2.6). The frequency on the show was 96.3 FM and it was located somewhere in California.

On March 1, 2010, KGRR shifted from a classic rock format to a mainstream rock format as "97.3 The Rock".
