= First National Bank of Dubuque =

The First National Bank of Dubuque was a bank headquartered in Dubuque, Iowa. First National was the oldest national bank to be located in Iowa. It was one of the few local banks to survive the Great Depression. After a series of mergers and acquisitions, the bank eventually became part of US Bancorp corporation.

In the early 1990s, First National changed its name to Hawkeye Bank of Dubuque when it merged with several other Iowa banking concerns. A few years later, the bank was merged into the Mercantile Bank corporation. Mercantile Bank was then acquired by Firstar Bank in 1999, which also had branches in Dubuque. When this happened, Firstar evaluated the local branches in Dubuque. It closed several branches, both from the Mercantile Bank chain and some existing Firstar Bank branches.

When Firstar merged with US Bancorp, the two banks became known as US Bank. What was once First National Bank of Dubuque is now known as US Bank.
