= Dubuque Millworking Historic District =

Historic district in Iowa, United States

- U.S. National Register of Historic Places
- U.S. Historic district
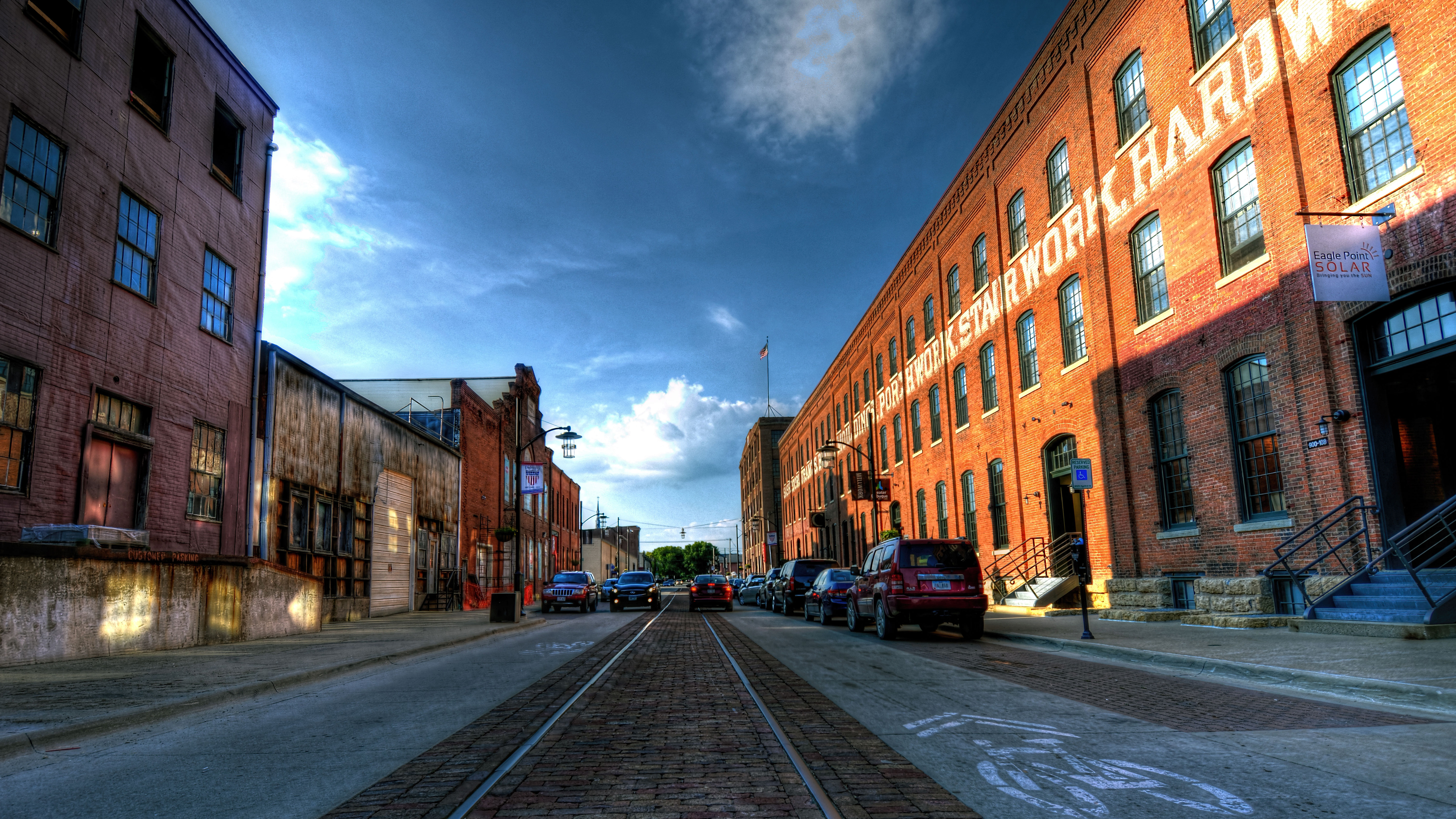
- 900 block of Jackson St.

- Location within Iowa Location within the United States
- Location: White, Jackson, and Elm between E. 6th and E. 11th Sts., Dubuque, Iowa
- Coordinates: 42°30′11.2″N 90°39′48.9″W
- Area: 17.61 acres (7.13 ha)
- Architect: Frederick C. Burdt; Fridolin Joseph Heer, Sr.
- Architectural style: Renaissance Revival; Gothic Revival
- MPS: Dubuque, Iowa MPS
- NRHP reference No.: 08001030
- Added to NRHP: November 7, 2008

The Dubuque Millworking Historic District is a nationally recognized historic district located in Dubuque, Iowa, United States. It was listed on the National Register of Historic Places in 2008. At the time of its nomination it consisted of 24 resources, which included 19 contributing buildings, and five contributing structures. Made up of large industrial buildings, the district represents the period of transition when Dubuque went from lumber production to millwork production. The buildings are associated with two local millworking firms, Carr, Ryder & Adams and Farley Loetscher. All of the buildings are brick construction, and are between two and five stories in height. Decorative features include pavilions, pilasters, large entry arches, decorative pediments and parapets. Two of the buildings fill an entire block, while three cover a half block. The most substantial buildings were built between 1881 and 1924.
