= Rappin' for Jesus =

2013 song and YouTube video

Single by Pastor Jim and Mary Sue Colerick
- Released: February 5, 2013 (video); February 14, 2013 (single)
- Genre: Christian hip hop
- Length: 2:32
- Label: Self-released

Music video
- "Rappin' for Jesus" on YouTube

"Rappin' for Jesus" is a 2013 viral music video. It was purportedly written for a Christian youth outreach program in Dubuque, Iowa, by Pastor Jim Colerick and his wife Mary Sue, but is generally thought to be a hoax or parody.

== Video ==
The video is introduced as a product of West Dubuque 2nd Church of Christ's Youth Outreach Program. It is set in a fellowship hall with an older man as a disc jockey.

It shows a male pastor, Jim Colerick, aiming to appeal to the youth through rap. He and his wife Mary Sue describe the life of Jesus Christ and criticize acts that they believe are sinful, such as blasphemy and recreational drug use. Colerick and his wife both repeatedly declare in the chorus that "Jesus Christ is [their] nigga".

== History ==
The original video was uploaded to YouTube by user Brian Spinney on February 5, 2013, and garnered wider attention through the website Reddit. Spinney claimed to have directed the video with his pastor while in high school.

=== Authenticity ===
The Daily Dot concluded the video is a hoax, calling it "obviously fake". Chris English, pastor of GracePoint Church in Dubuque, Iowa, said in 2013 that he had never heard of Pastor Jim Colerick or West Dubuque 2nd Church of Christ, the church supposedly affiliated with the song.

The website of West Dubuque 2nd Church of Christ, linked to by the original video, claims that the church closed in 2004. However, The Daily Dot pointed out that the website had been created on January 15, 2013, the same day as Spinney's YouTube channel. In light of this, The Huffington Post questioned the authenticity of the video, calling it "very peculiar indeed".

The identities of Jim and Mary Sue Colerick have since been discovered and were portrayed by actors named P.J. Waggaman and Elizabeth Ince.

== Reception ==
The song has the chorus line "Jesus Christ is my nigga". Pastor Chris English, in an email to The Christian Post, said the use of the word nigga was "clearly over the line, and offensive". He thought the video, parody or not, perpetuated many negative stereotypes about Christians, and as such, would have never worked in an outreach program for young people.

The Dallas Observer also criticized the song, saying: "it's cheesy. It's bad. It's painful." It described the song as having a negative impact on public perception of Christian rap.
