= DuTrac Community Credit Union =

Credit union in the United States

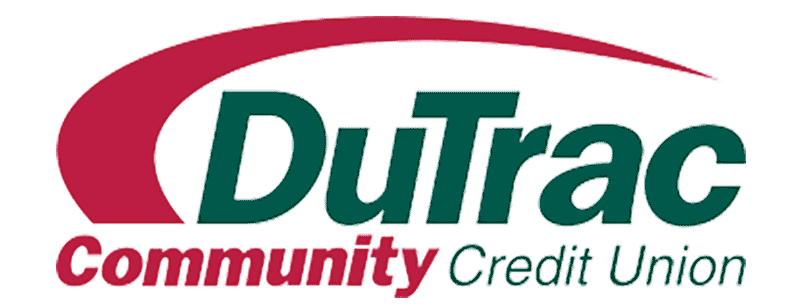
- Founded: July 25, 1946; 79 years ago
- Headquarters: Dubuque, Iowa
- Number of locations: 14 branches (2023)
- Key people: Andrew Hawkinson (President/CEO)
- Total assets: $1,040,388,019 (2023)
- Members: 53,385 (2023)
- Number of employees: 172 (June 2023)
- Website: www.dutrac.org

DuTrac Community Credit Union (DCCU) is an American non-profit cooperative financial institution based in Dubuque, Iowa. DCCU serves 34 counties in Iowa, Illinois, and Wisconsin. It was ranked in the top 1% of credit unions by Callahan & Associates in 2014.

As of 2023, DCCU was ranked as the 5th largest credit union in Iowa and was the 419th largest credit union in the United States by LendingTree. DCCU is governed by a volunteer board, according to the National Credit Union Administration. Member deposits up to $250,000 at DuTrac are insured through the National Credit Union Share Insurance Fund.

== History ==
The company was founded in 1946 by employees of Dubuque Tractor Works. In 2022, a branch office in Bettendorf, Iowa, was opened. Expansion of the credit union's branches in Dubuque, Iowa has resulted in the demolition of several 19th-century buildings and eviction of their tenants in order to provide better street access to its parking lot.
