= Shot Tower (Dubuque, Iowa) =

- George W. Rogers Company Shot Tower
- U.S. National Register of Historic Places
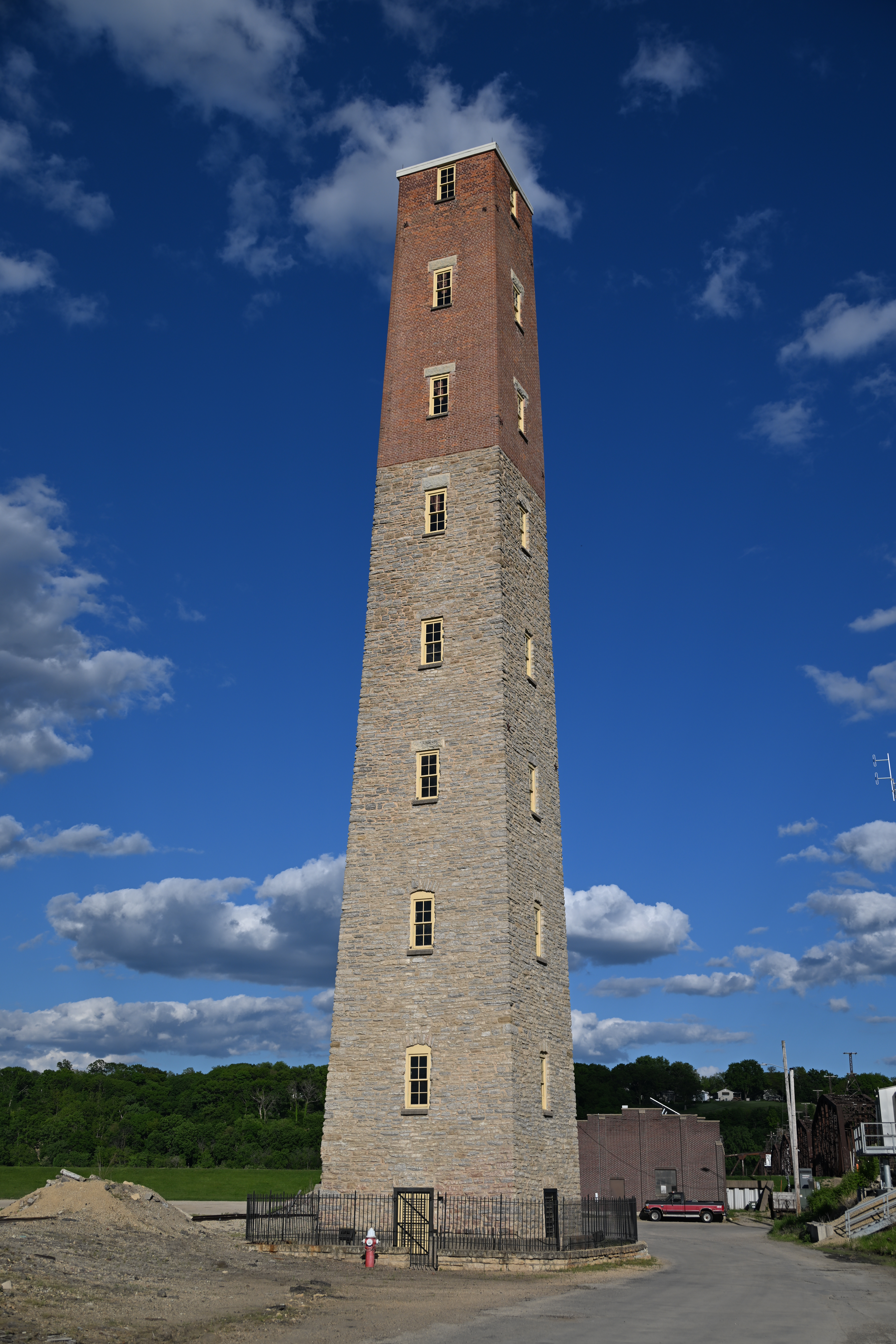
- The tower in 2025

- Location within Iowa Location within the United States
- Location: Commercial St. and River Front, Dubuque, Iowa
- Coordinates: 42°30′00.3″N 90°39′14.4″W
- Area: less than one acre
- Built: 1856
- Architect: C. H. Rogers & Co.
- Architectural style: Mid-19th century Exotic Revival
- NRHP reference No.: 76000767
- Added to NRHP: November 07, 1976

The Shot Tower located in Dubuque, Iowa, is one of the last remaining shot towers in the United States. It is listed on the National Register of Historic Places and remains a recognized symbol of the city. The tower stands 120 feet 5 inches (36.70 m) tall. At its location near the Mississippi River, the tower can be seen from the riverwalk. The tower underwent extensive renovations beginning in 2004.

== History ==
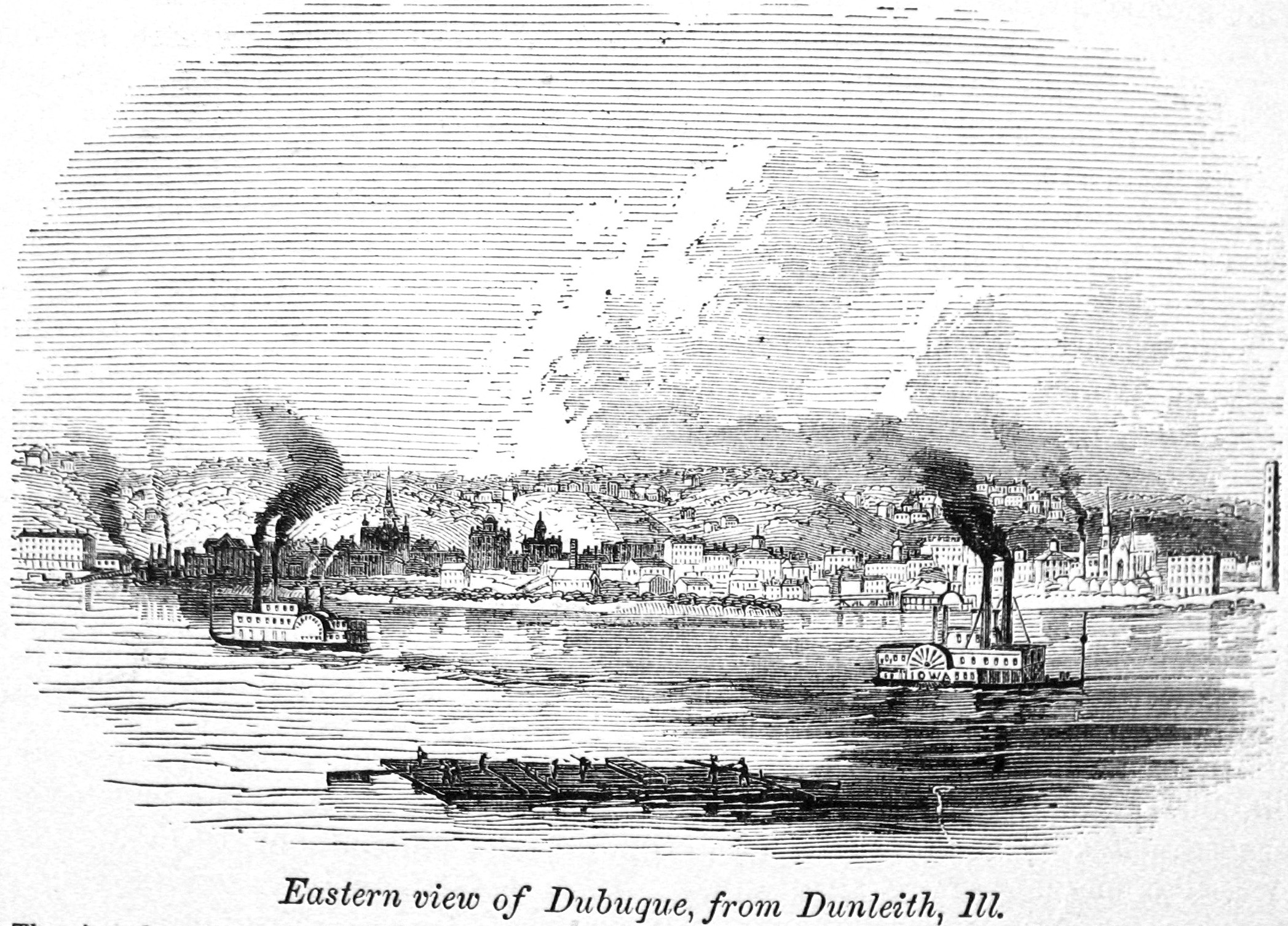
Dubuque in 1865, the Shot Tower can be seen on the far right edge.

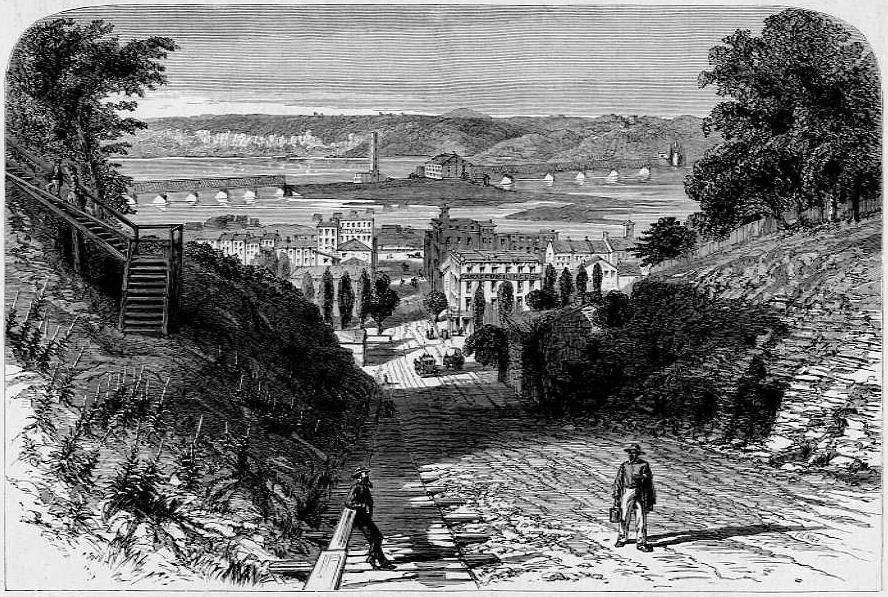
Bridges on the Mississippi, at Dubuque, an 1872 wood engraving showing the tower in the center

The tower was built in 1856 to provide lead shot. The invention of the shot tower enabled economical production of many nearly perfect lead spheres of the right size to fit in a shot gun. To make the shot, molten lead was poured through a grate at the top of the tower. The droplets that fell from the grate were of relatively uniform size, and the fall provided enough time for the liquid-metal droplet to form into a sphere before landing in the water below. The water cooled the lead to its solid state, retaining the spherical shape.

The shot tower struggled almost immediately due to economic downturn from the Panic of 1857. A St. Louis company, Chadbourne & Co., purchased the Dubuque tower, but did not use it. After the war, the Standard Lumber Company used it as a fire watchtower.

The tower was abandoned after a series of fires in 1911 destroyed the local lumber industry and damaged the tower's wooden interior. The fire was determined to be arson, but no one was ever arrested. In 1976, the tower was listed in the National Register of Historic Places. Tuckpointing and repairs soon followed, and in 2004, the Shot Tower became part of ongoing riverfront renovations.
