= Dubuque Star Brewery =

- U.S. National Register of Historic Places
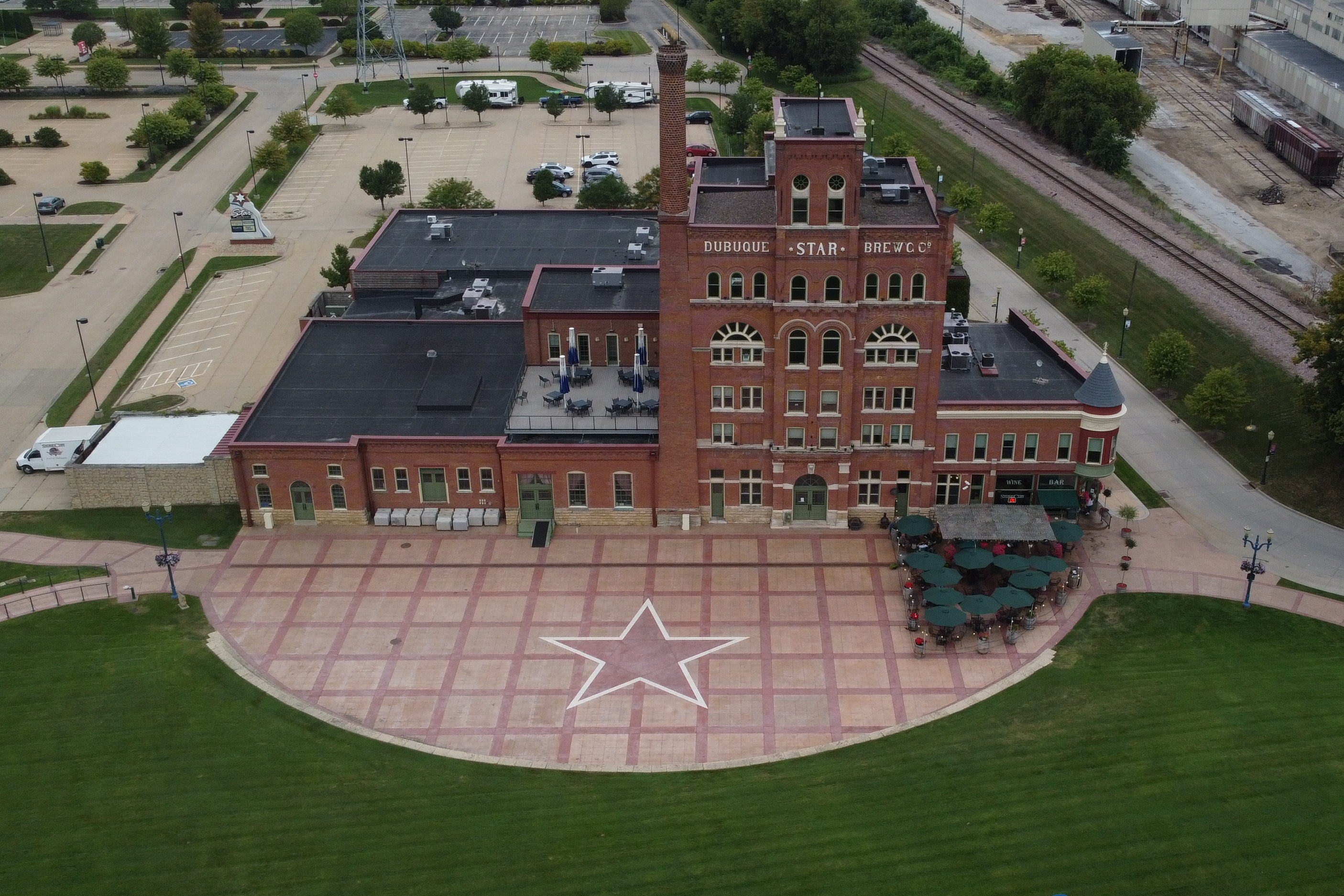
- Dubuque Star Brewery in 2022

- Location within Iowa Location within the United States
- Location: 500 E. Fifth St. Dubuque, Iowa
- Coordinates: 42°29′58″N 90°39′15″W
- Area: 2.4 acres (0.97 ha)
- Built: 1899
- Architect: Fred Rautert
- Architectural style: Romanesque
- MPS: Dubuque, Iowa MPS
- NRHP reference No.: 07000348
- Added to NRHP: April 24, 2007

The Dubuque Star Brewery, in Dubuque, Iowa, is a building that for many years made Dubuque Star beers. The brewery is located just north of the Ice Harbor in Dubuque.

It was listed on the National Register of Historic Places in 2007.

== History ==
Dubuque Star was established by Joseph Rhomberg in 1898. Until the beginning of Prohibition, during which it was closed, it produced Dubuque Star beer. After the repeal of Prohibition in 1933, the brewery reopened. Because of its location near the Mississippi River, river floods would often cause problems for the brewery, including the 1965 Mississippi River flood.

In 2006 Stone Cliff Winery leased part of the ground floor, where it opened a winery in 2007.

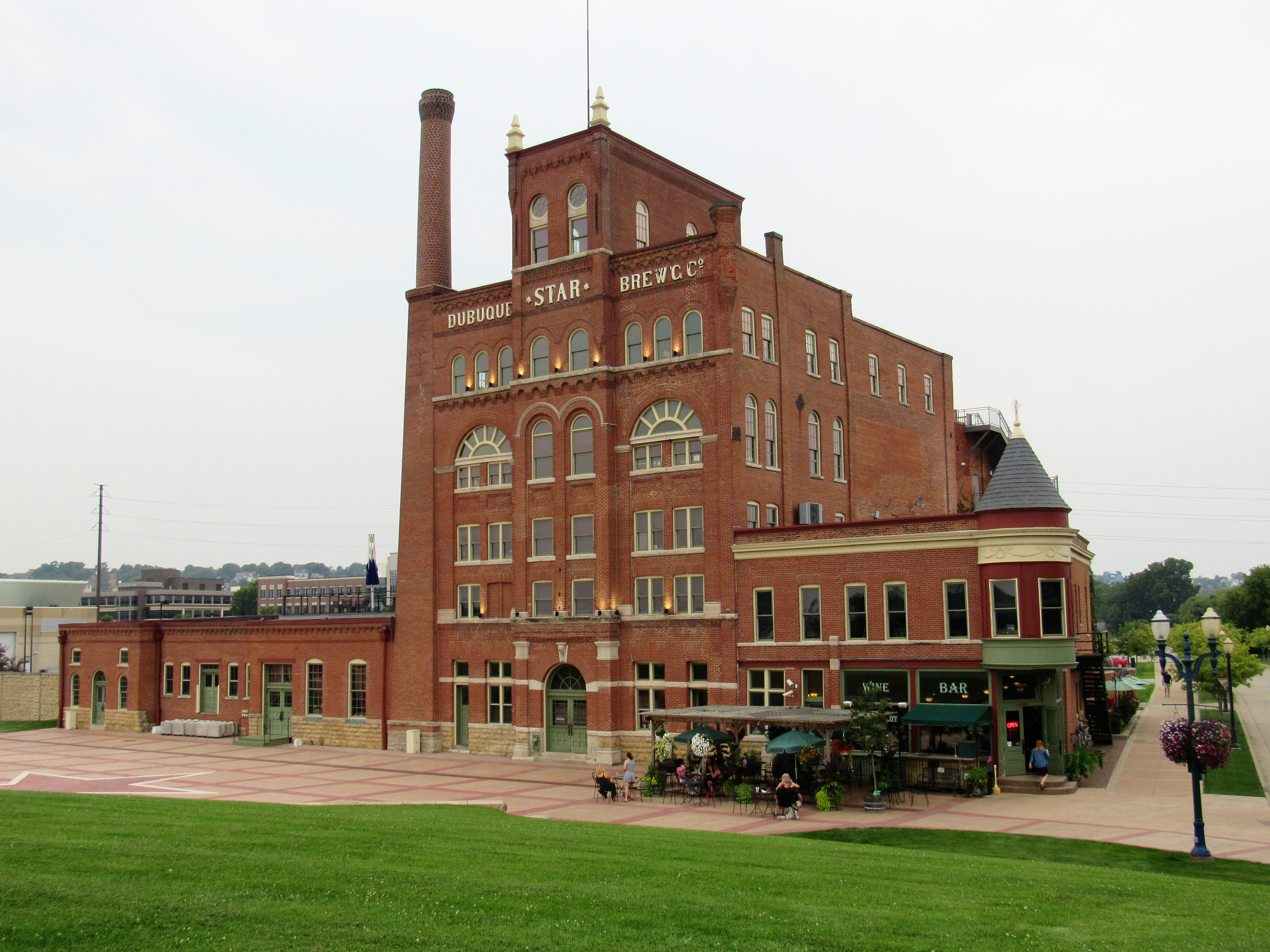
2018

.

== See also ==
- List of defunct breweries in the United States
