= Community Broadband Network =

British social enterprise

CBN
- Company type: Industrial and provident society
- Industry: Broadband networking
- Founded: 2004
- Website: http://www.broadband.coop

The Community Broadband Network (CBN) is a British social enterprise which supports and develops community-led broadband initiatives.

== History ==
CBN was launched in the United Kingdom during January 2004 by the then Rural Affairs Minister Alun Michael and Broadband Minister Stephen Timms; at this time the UK was lagging behind neighboring developed countries in the provision of first generation broadband services, leaving significant holes in availability. Many of these "notspots" were in rural areas or were the focus of economic regeneration programmes; local community organizations were beginning to develop their own services typically using Wi-Fi wireless technology but often without specialist telecommunications knowledge within their groups. CBN was founded as a co-operative of such groups, able to provide support and specialist skills to its members; during 2004-5 CBN supported over 100 local broadband projects with direct consultancy and mentoring, and provided online information and support for a further 200.

== Today ==
With first generation broadband widely available in the UK, CBN's focus shifted towards the community led higher-speed next-generation broadband services, including fibre-optic networks. In 2006 CBN signed a joint venture agreement with Dutch consultancy Close the Gap, which was responsible for conceiving, planning and delivering the OnsNet (“our net” in English) Fibre to the Home (Ftth) project in the market town of Nuenen and then in Eindhoven.

Retaining the social enterprise model, CBN now works with community groups, policy makers, and industry to develop thinking on next generation broadband platforms and strategies in the UK.

CBN is represented on several key broadband forums:

- An executive member of the UK Broadband stakeholder group, the body that brings together government, industry, Regional Development Agencies, and business to drive forward the UK's broadband agenda.
- A member of the NOMAD Wireless Forum bringing together a range of public sector and private organisations active in promoting wireless initiatives.
- A member of the Connected Neighbourhood Forum linking the 10 local authority Digital Challenge finalists.
- An invited participator in the high level summit organised by minister Stephen Timms in November 2007 to discuss policy on Next Generation Access in the UK.

CBN's experience has attracted international attention and they are developing community broadband projects in Africa supported by UN-HABITAT.

In 2008 Francesco Caio, in his report at barriers to broadband investment for the British Government, referred to CBN's scenario work which described a "patchwork quilt" of broadband infrastructures rather than a single "da wo" (big me) incumbent network owner. This led to Lord Carter recommending that CBN be assisted in creating a national framework in his Digital Britain report.

In 2009, CBN has been facilitating the creation of the Independent Networks Co-operative Association (INCA) to meet the Digital Britain recommendations. INCA is essentially a trade association for independent network operators in the UK who are investing alternative next generation broadband infrastructures.
