= University of Wisconsin Madison Law Building =

Coordinates: 43°04′28.2″N 89°24′8.2″W

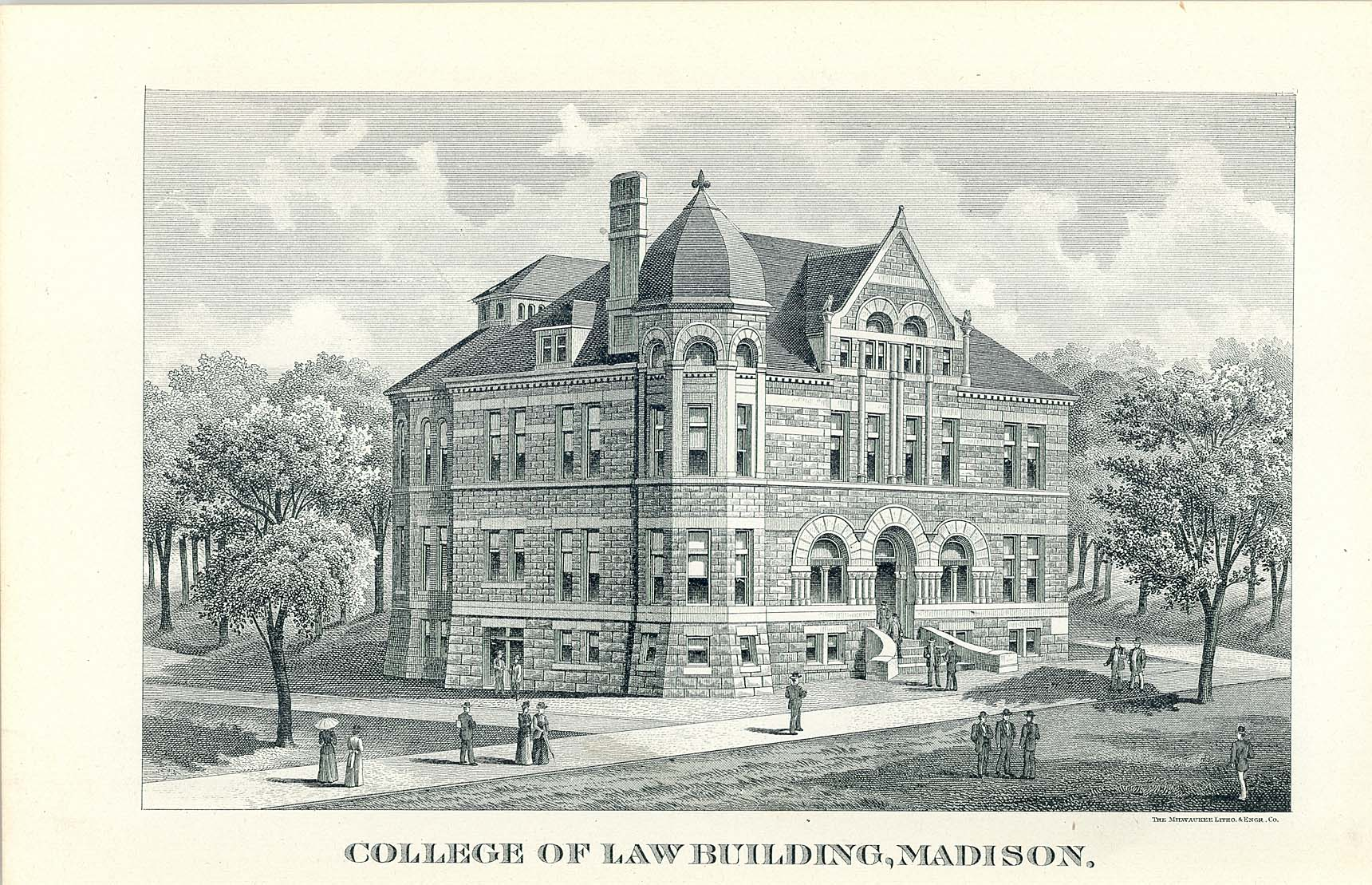
1893 Engraving of the University of Wisconsin School of Law's building

The law building is located on Bascom Hill on the University of Wisconsin–Madison campus, at 975 Bascom Mall, Madison, Wisconsin.

The University of Wisconsin Law School offers two major programs and one doctorate program to the almost 800 students that make up the student body.

== History ==
The College of Law was started in 1868, but the first building wasn't built until 1893. The first building was a maroon Castle like structure. It was torn down in the spring of 1963 to make way for an addition to the old building.

The second building was built in 1938; it is a square brick building on the south side of Bascom Hill. It was originally built to relieve congestion from the first building. Since the first building had been constructed, the way law was being taught had changed significantly. Law was now being taught more in small classrooms instead of large lecture rooms. It's a six-story building and cost $1.5 million to build. The building is 94,000 square feet, and holds 100,000 volumes of textbooks. The building was then also built specially to not burn down so that the many textbooks, documents, and other papers stay safe and are not lost. A main attraction for this part of the building is the mural painted in the old reading room in the library. The mural is called The Freeing of the Slaves and is 12 by 35 feet, with the central figure standing 11 feet tall.

The newest addition to the law building was finished in 1996. It is 138,000 square feet and cost $16.1 million to build. It was 15 years in design and management and took two years to construct. It added faculty offices, large classrooms, lecture rooms, and two mock trial rooms. Also the addition added 200,000 new spaces for textbooks in the library. It is combined to the old building to allow easy movement between buildings. The engineers called it "The Hanger" because of its appearance; giant glass windows surround the library to allow the natural light to enter.
