= Mathias Ham House =

Historic house in Iowa, United States

- U.S. National Register of Historic Places
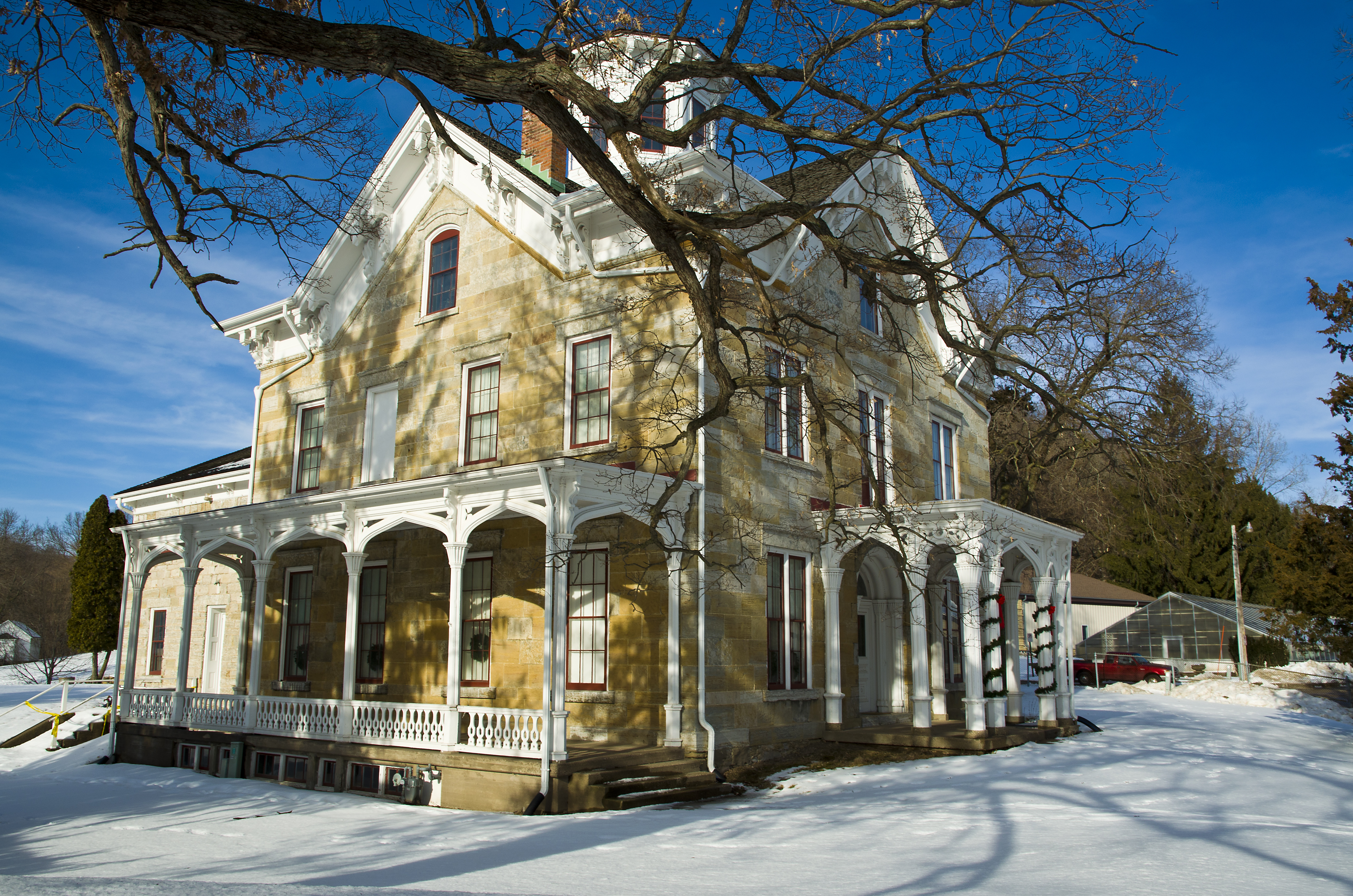
- Mathias Ham House January 2012

- Location within Iowa Location within the United States
- Location: 2241 Lincoln Ave. Dubuque, Iowa
- Coordinates: 42°31′53″N 90°39′2″W
- Built: 1856
- Architect: John F. Rague
- Architectural style: Late Victorian
- NRHP reference No.: 76000764
- Added to NRHP: July 19, 1976

The Mathias Ham House is a 19th-century house in Dubuque, Iowa, that is on the National Register of Historic Places. It is located at the intersection of Shiras and Lincoln Avenues, near the entrances to Eagle Point Park and Riverview Park.

== Description ==
The house was designed by John F. Rague and built for local businessman and lead miner Mathias Ham in 1857. Ham had owned an island in the Mississippi River at Dubuque, called Ham's Island (which has since renamed City Island and then Chaplain Schmitt Memorial Island, after Father Aloysius Schmitt). The architect, John F. Rague, who had designed the original state capitol buildings at Springfield, Illinois and at Iowa City, Iowa, designed the house in the Italian Villa style.

The Mathias Ham House has been restored and transformed into a museum showcasing life during the Antebellum era; it contains American and European furnishings from that period. The property also features the Louis Arriandeaux Log House, a double log cabin in the dogtrot style, which is considered the oldest building in Iowa. The cabin was built in 1833 at 2nd and Locust Streets in Dubuque, then moved to Eagle Point Park in Dubuque before being moved to the Mathias Ham House Historic Site.

Additionally, a one-room schoolhouse (the former Humke School) was relocated to the property. A replica mine shaft and "badger hole" or "badger hut" were constructed on the property to educate the public about Dubuque's lead mining history.

== Museum ==
The museum is operated by the Dubuque County Historical Society, which also operates the National Mississippi River Museum & Aquarium.
