= North Hall (University of Wisconsin) =

- North Hall, University of Wisconsin
- U.S. National Register of Historic Places
- U.S. National Historic Landmark
- U.S. Historic district – Contributing property
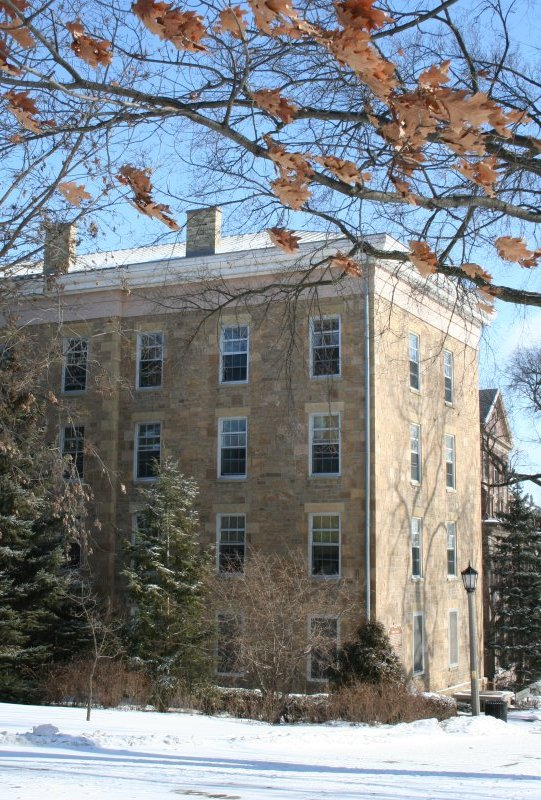

- Location within Wisconsin Location within the United States
- Location: Madison, Wisconsin
- Coordinates: 43°4′32.45″N 89°24′10.65″W
- Built: 1851
- Architect: John F. Rague
- Architectural style: Greek Revival
- Part of: Bascom Hill Historic District (ID74000065)
- NRHP reference No.: 66000021

Significant dates
- Added to NRHP: October 15, 1966
- Designated NHL: December 21, 1965

North Hall was the University of Wisconsin–Madison's first building. Built in 1851 in the woods and brush that would become Bascom Hill, this one building was the UW for its first four years, housing both dorm rooms and lecture halls. John Muir resided in North Hall when he was a student at the university from 1860 to 1863.

In 1965 North Hall was listed as a National Historic Landmark. It currently houses the offices of the political science faculty at the university.

== History ==
The city of Madison was established as the capital of Wisconsin Territory in 1836. By 1838, the wooded hill west of the capitol was optimistically being called "College Hill," though there was no college. In 1848 the University of Wisconsin was established by the state legislature - the same year Wisconsin became a state. But there was not a single building yet. In February 1849, under the mantle of the new university, Dr. John Sterling commenced a preparatory school for twenty boys downtown in a room of the Madison Female Academy.

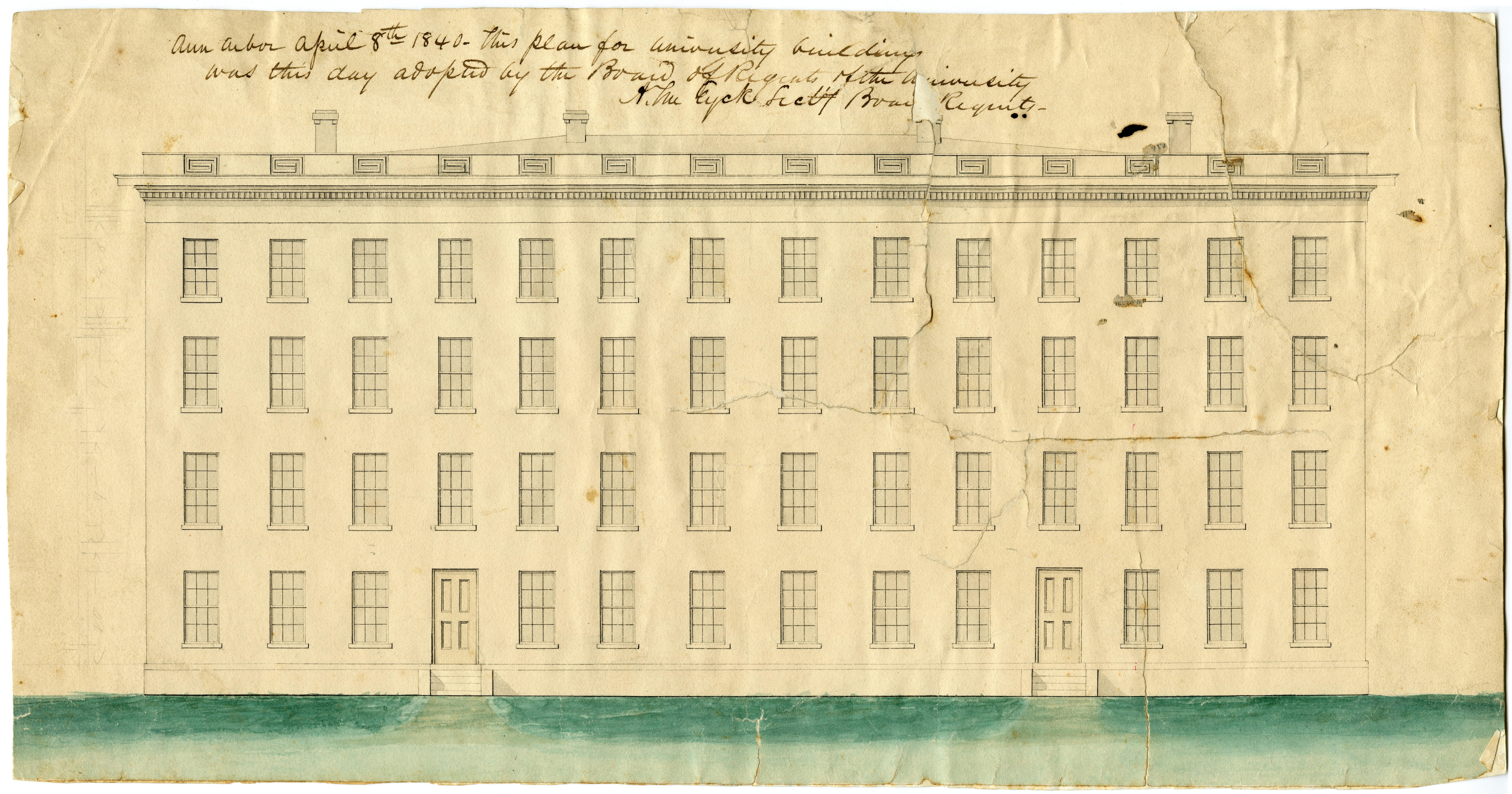
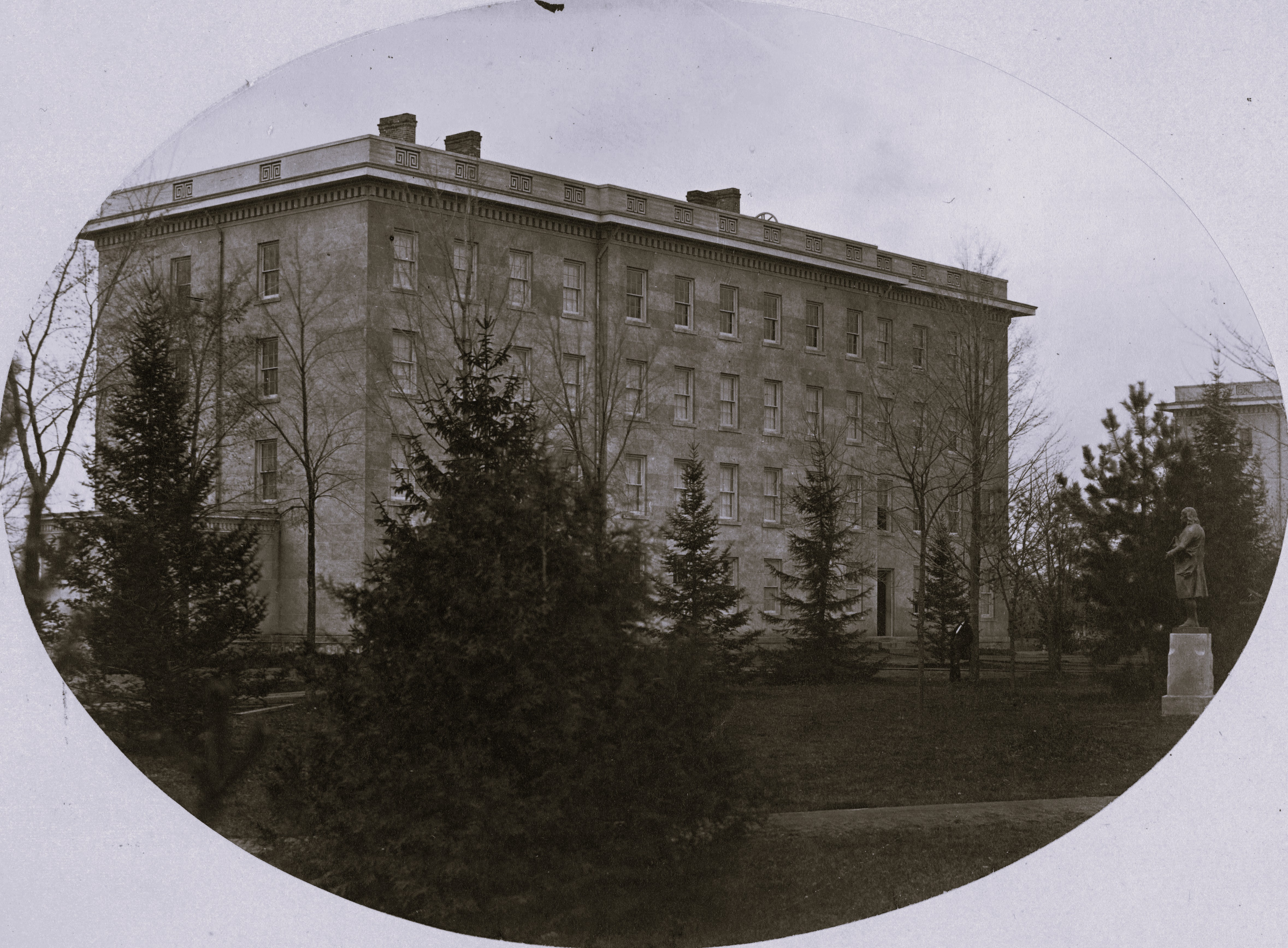
John F. Rague's North Hall was inspired by Mason Hall at the University of Michigan, built a decade earlier

Meanwhile, Chancellor Lathrop, Regents Mills and Dean, and Milwaukee architect John F. Rague drew up a general plan for university buildings. A "main edifice" would stand at the top of College Hill. Down the hill from it would be four dormitories, "each building to be four stories high, 110 feet in length and forty feet in breadth, containing thirty-two studies for the use of students, each study having two bed-rooms and a wood room attached." Rather than construct the main edifice (classrooms and offices) first, the university built the dormitory North Hall in 1851. Rague designed it in Greek Revival style, similar to the dormitories at the University of Michigan, and clad in sandstone, very much as described above.

North Hall was built in 1851, with construction overseen by James Livesey. Its first three floors were dormitory organized into suites where each suite had a study room and two bedrooms. The fourth floor housed lecture rooms, study rooms, and a chapel. The first year there were 30 students, three faculty, and a janitor. Faculty were Chancellor Lathrop, Professor Sterling, and O.M. Conover. The janitor lived in the hall with the students and on cold days in winter the students called for the janitor to stoke the furnace. "Wood up John! Wood up!" At first the building was heated by two hot-air furnaces. Students hauled their own water from a nearby well. Toilets were outside - simple privies. The first class began at 6am and the last ended at 9pm, with a curfew at nine.

This one building held all functions of the university for the first four years. Then in 1855 South Hall was completed across the mall - also designed by John Rague and very similar to North Hall on the outside.

During the Civil War stoves were put in each room of North Hall and students had to fuel them, often with wood from the forest nearby. John Muir lived in the dormitory during this period, from 1861 to 1863. At some point a mess was set up in the first floor of North Hall, where students could eat for about eighty cents a week.

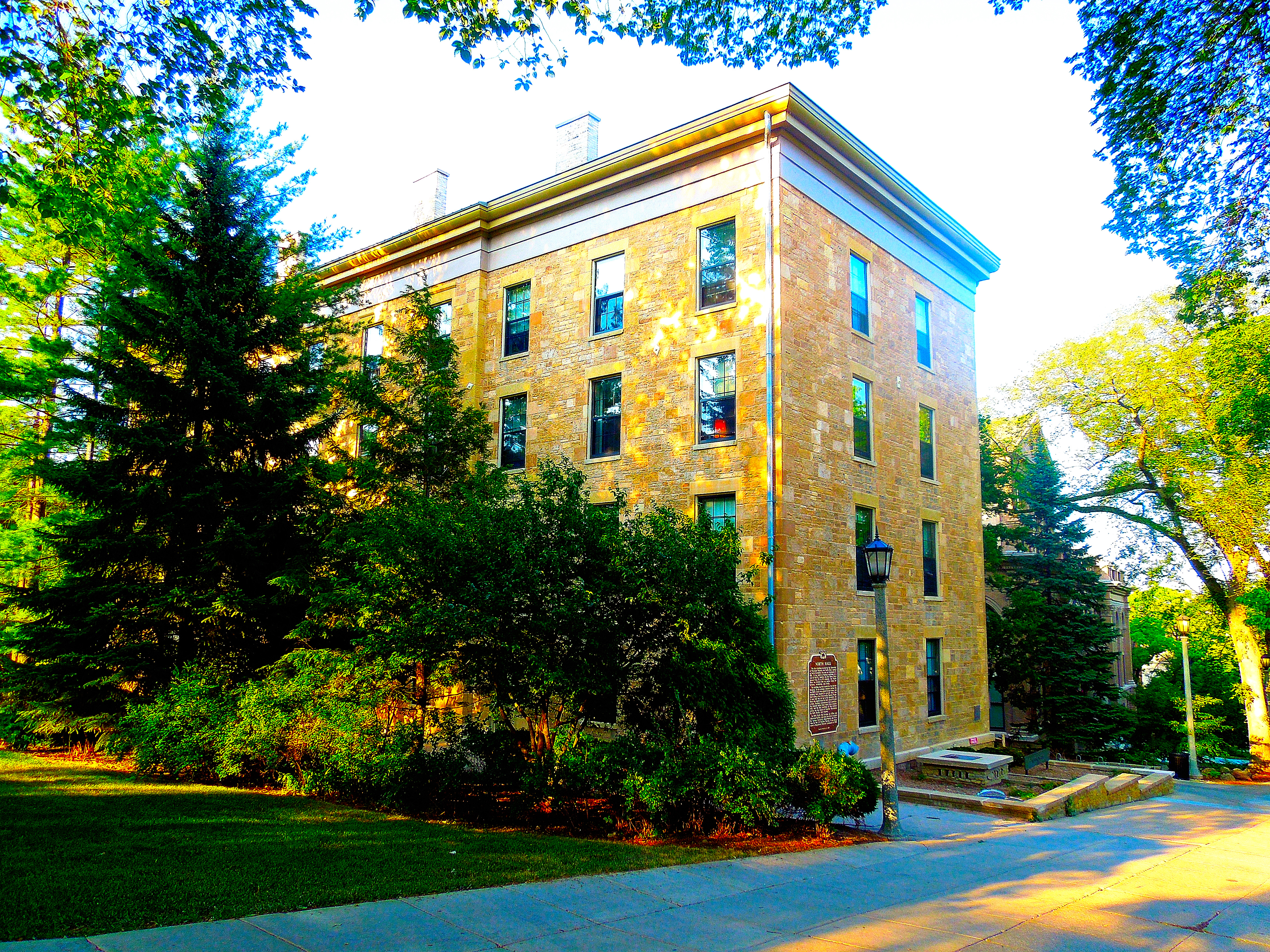
North Hall in 2012

North Hall continued to serve as a dormitory until the huge new Science Hall burned in 1884. In the ensuing space crunch, North Hall was converted fully from a residence hall to instructional space and offices. It has since housed the pharmacy school, German and Scandinavian studies, math, the Madison Weather Bureau, and the political science department.

== Architecture ==
North Hall was opened at the University of Wisconsin on September 17, 1851, as the North Dormitory. The sandstone building, which cost $19,000, was typical to educational buildings of the era. The four-story building is rectangular, has a hipped roof, and features little decoration. The east and west facades have ten bays; the center four project slightly beyond the other six. Single-door entrances are found on these facades near the ends. A plain yet deep cornice decorates the roofline. Windows and doors have plain lintel blocks and eight interior chimneys protrude from the roof.

The exterior has retained its original appearance. The interior has been largely remodeled, although original staircases are in place and some rooms maintain their original arrangements.

== Significance ==
In 1965 North Hall was declared a National Historic Landmark. The exterior is little changed from when this building was the germ of the university that would advance the Wisconsin Idea - the idea that the benefits of the university should reach every family of the state. It did this by developing the agricultural extension courses, which helped farmers be more productive and safer, and by providing expertise to government during the Progressive Era, advising on such innovations as primary elections, workers' compensation, and progressive taxation.
