= Dubuque City Hall =

- U.S. National Register of Historic Places
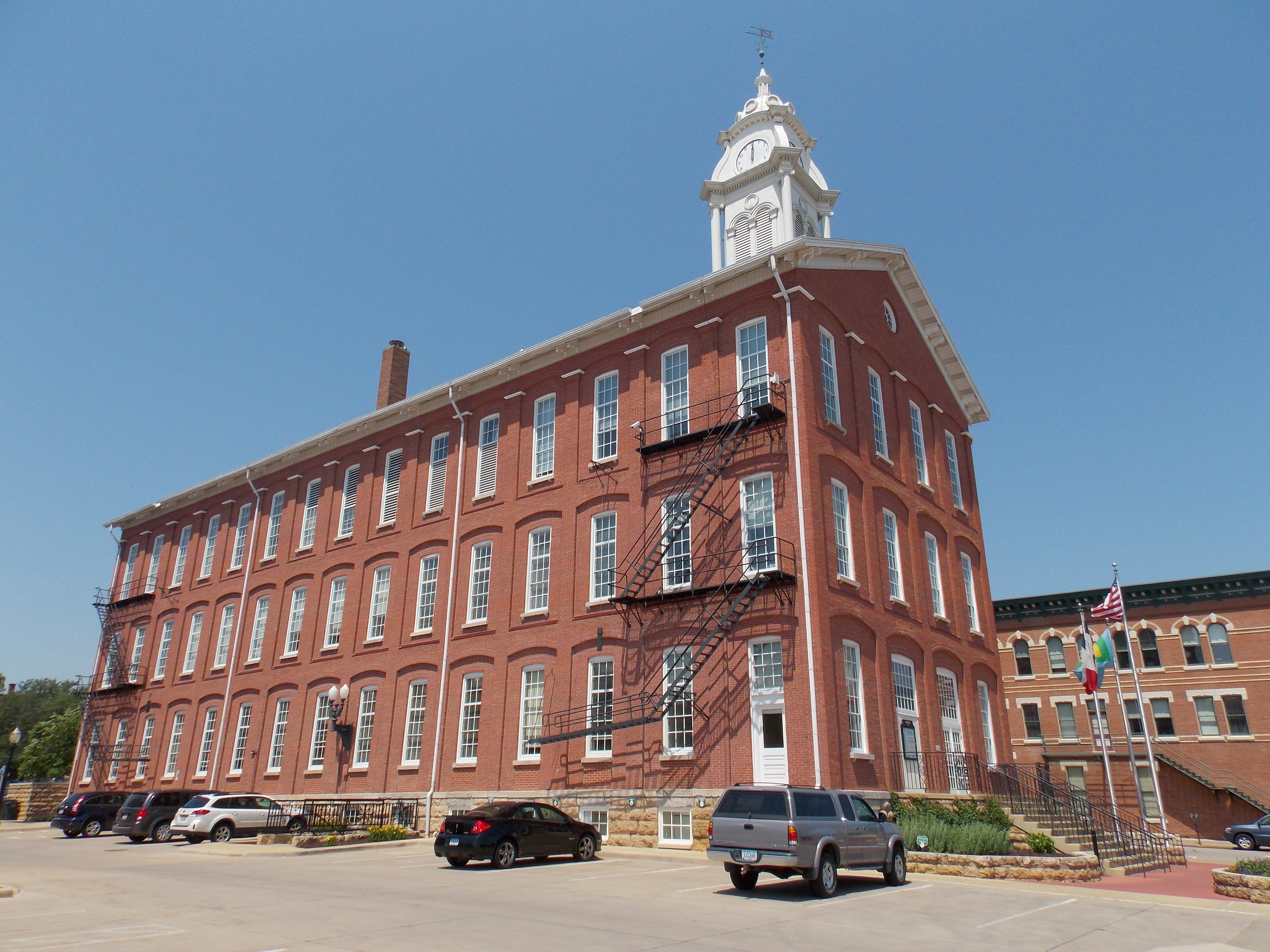

- Location within Iowa Location within the United States
- Location: 50 W. 13th St. Dubuque, Iowa
- Coordinates: 42°30′19″N 90°40′03″W
- Area: less than one acre
- Built: 1857
- Architect: J.N. Moody; John Francis Rague
- NRHP reference No.: 72000472
- Added to NRHP: September 14, 1972

Dubuque City Hall is located in Dubuque, Iowa, United States. The building was designed by J.N. Moody after Faneuil Hall in Boston and the Fulton Street Market in New York City. Dubuque architect John F. Rague served as the supervising architect during construction. Following a Medieval tradition, the city market was located on the first floor, municipal offices were located on the second floor, and a ballroom for civic events was located on the third floor.

The three-story brick structure rests on a raised limestone basement. It features a gable roof with bracketed eaves. Each gable has a circular window. The 11-foot (3.4 m) tall windows are located in bays defined by arches. The building was first occupied in February 1858. Initially, the main floor was divided into stalls. They were converted into additional office space for the city when the market relocated. The third floor ballroom was converted into an archery and pistol range for the police department, a bowling alley, and a horseshoe pitching area. The original cupola, which held a bell and four-faced clock, became deteriorated and was removed from the building in 1954. The bell was placed in the plaza next to city hall. The building was listed on the National Register of Historic Places in 1972. A new cupola was created using the original design, and it was erected in 1990. The bell was returned to the tower at that time.

== See also ==
- List of mayors of Dubuque, Iowa
