= Dubuque County Jail =

Building in Dubuque, Iowa

- U.S. National Register of Historic Places
- U.S. National Historic Landmark
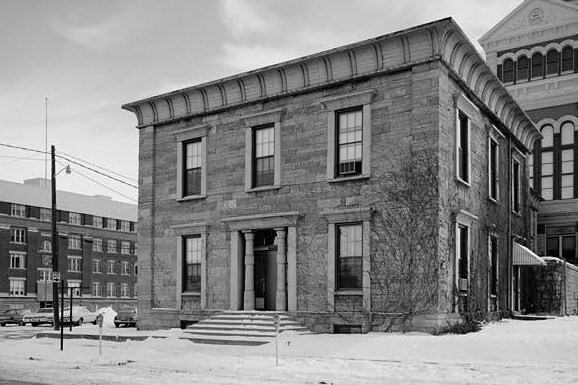
- Dubuque County Jail

- Location within Iowa
- Location: 36 East 8th St. Dubuque, Iowa
- Coordinates: 42°30′3.74″N 90°39′52.89″W
- Area: less than one acre
- Built: 1858
- Built by: David Armstrong
- Architect: Rague & Drake
- Architectural style: Exotic Revival
- NRHP reference No.: 72000473

Significant dates
- Added to NRHP: June 27, 1972
- Designated NHL: May 28, 1987

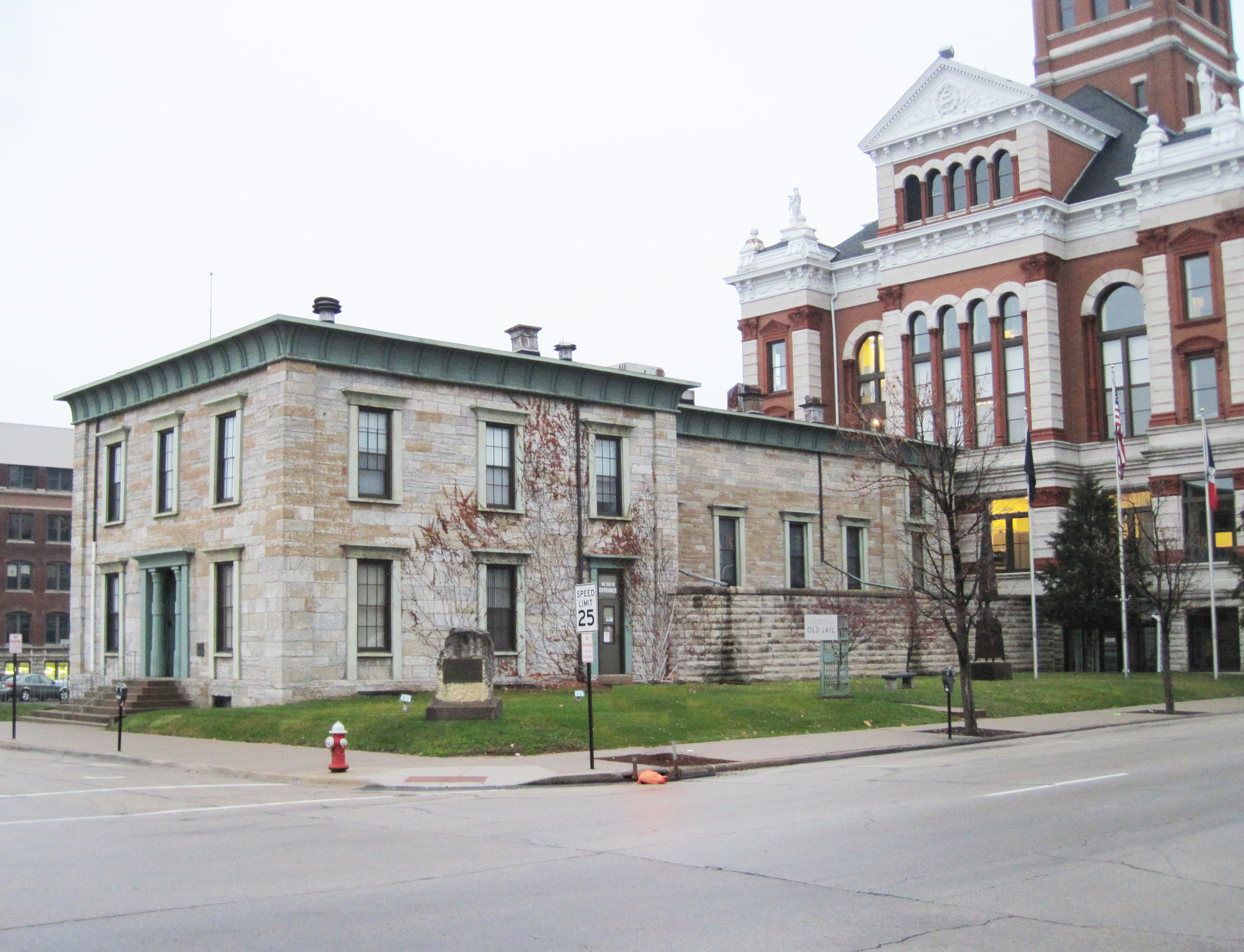
2009 jail photo; Dubuque County Courthouse on right.

The Dubuque County Jail is a historic building at 36 East 8th Street in Dubuque, Iowa, United States. Completed in 1858, the jail is an example of the uncommon Egyptian Revival style. It is architecturally a highly original work of John F. Rague, who also designed the 1837 Old Capitol of Illinois and the 1840 Territorial Capitol of Iowa. The building was designated a National Historic Landmark for its architecture in 1987. It served as a jail for more than a century, became a museum in 1975, and was converted into county offices in 2016.

== History ==
The first Dubuque County, Iowa jail was a stone building nicknamed the "calaboose" built in 1836. It was succeeded by a log building at the corner of 8th and Clay Streets that was intended to be built as a county courthouse. By 1855, it was apparent that a larger structure was needed. On April 1, 1856, citizens of the county voted to approve the construction of the current structure for $40,000. On April 17, the construction contract was awarded to David Armstrong. Rague & Drake designed the structure.

The new county jail was built with blue limestone from Dunleith, Illinois. Completed in 1858, the jail had thirty-two cells and a Sheriff's residence. On June 1, 1874, a six-cell addition was approved for the eastern portion of the building to house female prisoners. It was completed that December for $5,600. The building was used as a jail until 1971.

On June 27, 1972, the building was recognized by the National Park Service with a listing on the National Register of Historic Places. In 1975, the Dubuque Art Association rented the building as a museum. In 1983, the Dubuque County Supervisors extended the lease for twenty more years; this marked the first time that the association had a long-term home. The jail was declared a National Historic Landmark on May 28, 1987. When the lease expired in 2003, the association moved into a bank building by Washington Park. The Dubuque County Historical Society took over operations, turning the gallery into the Old Jail Museum. The county felt the space was underutilized, and converted it to office space in 2016 for the county medical examiner, I.T. department and veteran's affairs office. the renovation cost $800,000 and maintained and restored much of the original character of the building.

== See also ==
- List of National Historic Landmarks in Iowa
- National Register of Historic Places listings in Dubuque County, Iowa
