= Langworthy House =

Historic house in Iowa, United States

- U.S. National Register of Historic Places
- U.S. Historic district – Contributing property
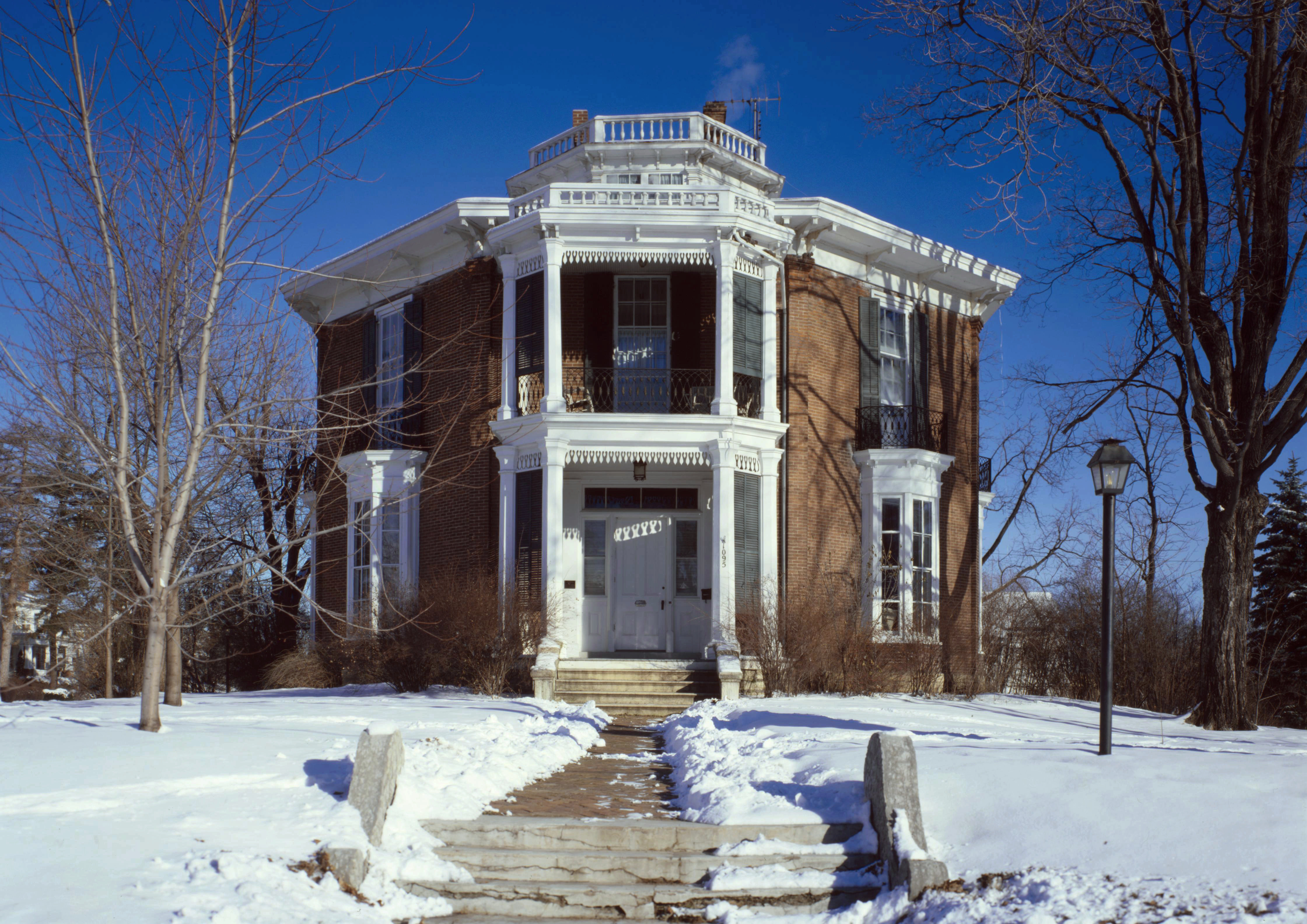
- Southern front of the house

- Location within Iowa Location within the United States
- Location: 1095 W. 3rd St. Dubuque, Iowa
- Coordinates: 42°29′43.6″N 90°40′45″W
- Built: 1856
- Architect: John F. Rague
- Architectural style: Octagon Mode
- Part of: Langworthy Historic District (ID86002102)
- NRHP reference No.: 75000685
- Added to NRHP: October 14, 1975

The Langworthy House, also known as the Octagon House, is a historic building located in Dubuque, Iowa, United States. Built in 1856, it was designed by local architect John F. Rague for local politician Edward Langworthy. The two-story brick home features tall windows, a columned entry, and a windowed cupola. Langworthy and three of his brothers were among the first settlers in Dubuque. They were partners in a lead mine, helped to build the territorial road between Dubuque and Iowa City, they farmed, invested in real estate, and they owned a steamboat and a mercantile exchange. The house has been passed down through Langworthy's descendants. It was individually listed on the National Register of Historic Places in 1975, and it was included as a contributing property in the Langworthy Historic District in 2004.
