= Bascom Hill =

Coordinates: 43.075342°N 89.404078°W

- Bascom Hill Historic District
- U.S. National Register of Historic Places
- U.S. Historic district
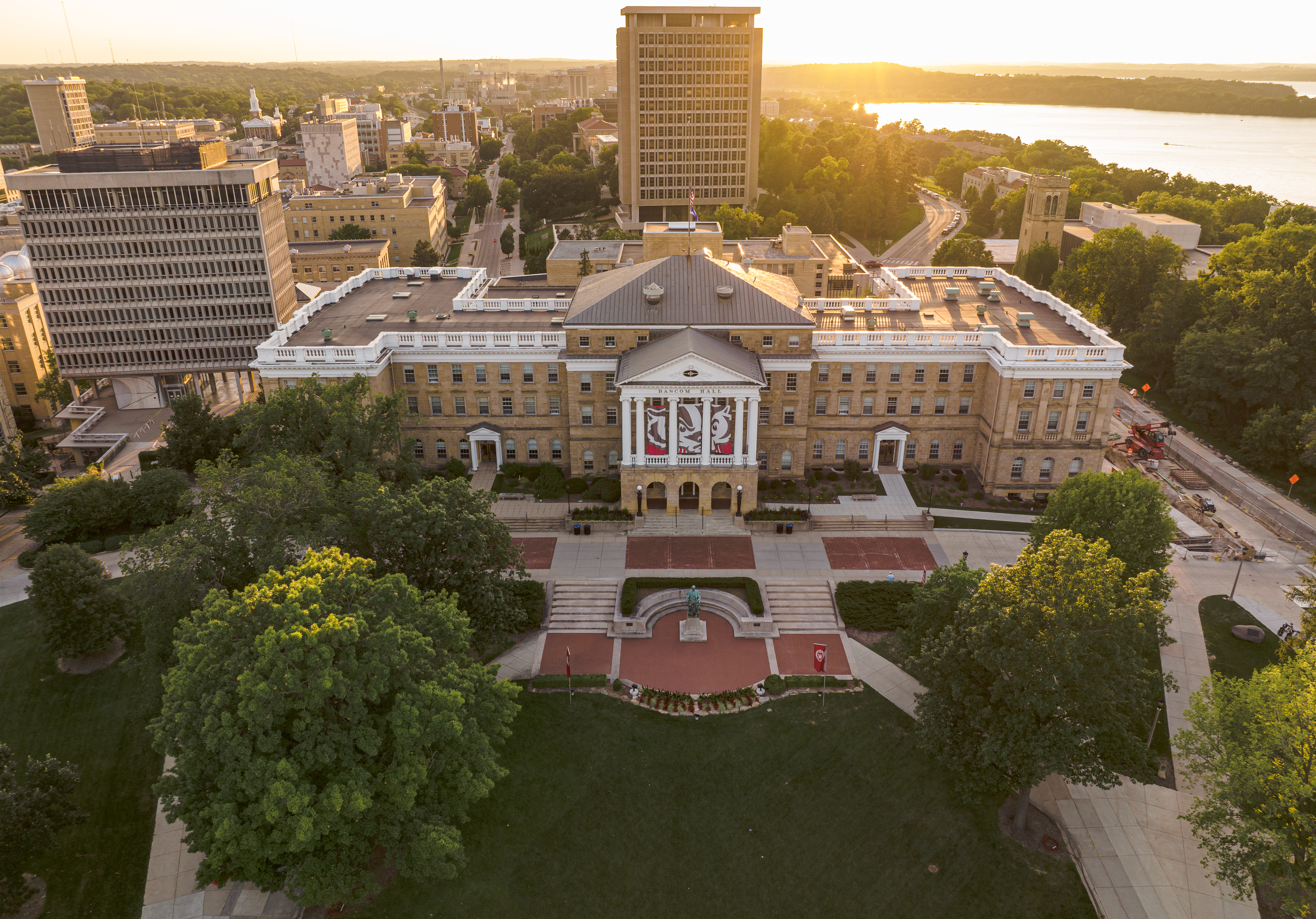
- Modern Bascom Hall atop Bascom Hill

- Location within Wisconsin Location within the United States
- Location: Bounded by Observatory Dr., University Ave., and N. Park, Langdon, and State Sts. Madison, Wisconsin
- Built: 1849
- Architectural style: Gothic, Romanesque
- NRHP reference No.: 74000065
- Added to NRHP: September 12, 1974

Bascom Hill is the iconic main quadrangle that forms the historic core of the University of Wisconsin–Madison campus. It is located on the opposite end of State Street from the Wisconsin State Capitol, and is named after John Bascom, former president of the University of Wisconsin.

The hill is crowned by Bascom Hall, the main administration building for the campus. Near the main entrance to Bascom Hall sits a statue of President Abraham Lincoln. The first university building, North Hall, was constructed on Bascom Hill in 1851 and is still in use by the Department of Political Science. The second building, South Hall, was built in 1855 and is now used by the administration of the University of Wisconsin College of Letters and Science.

In 1974 the area was listed on the National Register of Historic Places as the Bascom Hill Historic District. In addition to the main quadrangle, the district includes historic buildings ranging from the Red Gym to the Wisconsin Historical Society building to the Carillon Tower. The NRHP nomination considers the district "the most historic cluster of institutional buildings in Wisconsin."

== Beginnings ==
Prior to white settlement around 1837, the area that would become Madison was quiet woods and savannahs, swamps and lakes. Woodland people built effigy mounds like the water spirit mound near Washburn Observatory, and their probable descendants the Ho-Chunk called the place Ta-ko-per-ah, meaning "land of the four lakes."

On the isthmus between Lakes Mendota and Monona were two hills, drumlins formed about 18,000 years ago by the last glacier. When Madison was selected as Wisconsin Territory's capital in 1836, the top of the eastern hill was reserved for the territorial capitol building, and the state capitol stands there today. The other hill a mile to the west came to be called optimistically "College Hill" around 1838, years before there was any college.

The young city had a cemetery on the hill from 1837 to about 1846, just near where the Lincoln statue now sits. A William Nelson who died of typhoid in 1837 was buried there, the first white man to die in Madison. Most or all burials there have since been relocated.

The location of Wisconsin's capital had been contentious, and the lead promoter of Madison, Judge James Doty, had gained allies and secured their ongoing motivation by selling them wild parcels around the proposed city. One of those parcels was 160 acres on Bascom Hill which was sold to New York Congressman Aaron Vanderpoel in 1838 for $1.25 an acre. In 1848 when the new State of Wisconsin created the university, the state bought the land from Vanderpoel for $15 an acre.

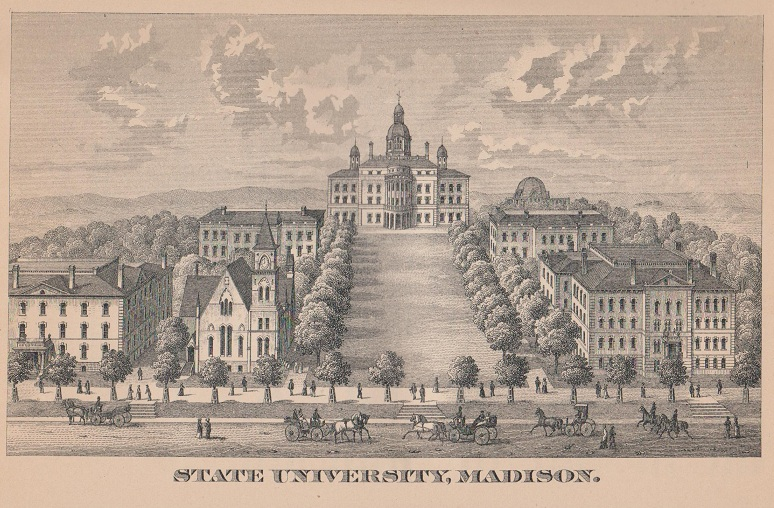
1885 engraving of UW campus looking up Bascom Hill

A general plan for the physical university was in place by 1850, with a "Main Edifice" sketched in where Bascom Hall now sits at the top of the hill and a broad open space running east down the hill toward the capitol, with a "North Dorm" and a "South Dorm" on each side and two similar dorms drawn below. That general configuration was apparently laid out by Milwaukee architect John F. Rague, and major elements remain to this day.

But in 1850 it was still only a plan on paper - nothing had been built.

== Buildings ==
The following buildings are listed in the order built. All are contributing properties to the NRHP's Bascom Hill Historic District unless otherwise noted.

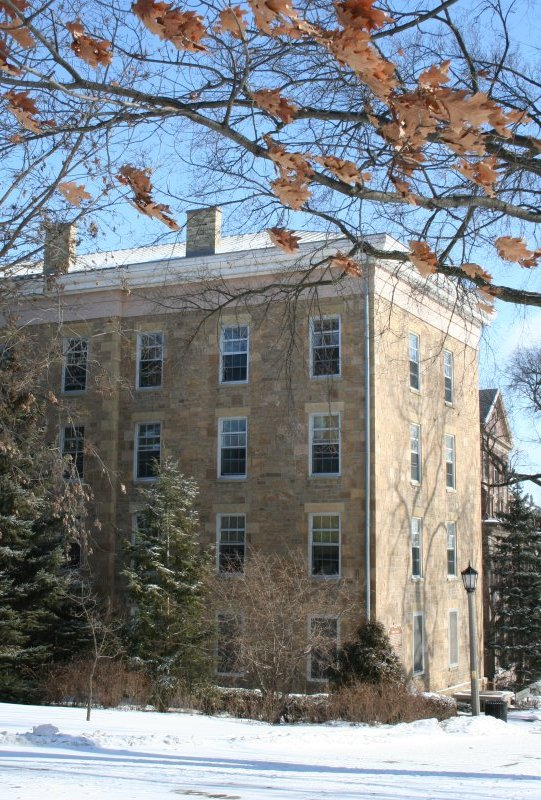
North Hall

=== North Hall (1851) ===
North Hall was the university's first building, constructed where "North Dorm" had been drawn in the general plan, at mid-right in the 1885 engraving. It was designed by John Rague in Federal style, a rather plain, sober architectural style popular before the Civil War. It stands four stories, clad in Madison sandstone - rather similar to dorms of the day at Ann Arbor, Michigan. Construction cost $19,000, and it opened in September 1851. For the first four years it was the only building on campus, so as well as living accommodations for 50 to 65 students, it contained lecture rooms, labs, a library and a chapel. It offered a mess where students could eat for eighty cents per week. Running water was not piped to the dorm floors, so residents had to carry their own water from a well nearby. The building had hot-air central heating from two furnaces, but when fuel became scarce during the Civil War, a stove was put in each room and residents had to procure their own fuel, often cutting trees nearby in what would become Muir Woods. In 1966 the building by itself was named a National Historic Landmark.

=== South Hall (1855) ===
South Hall followed four years later, located where "South Dorm" had been drawn in the general plan, at mid-left in the 1885 engraving. On the outside it was a twin of North Hall, also designed by John Rague. Inside, the north half of the building was partitioned into a chemical lab, a natural science collection, a library, a philosophical chamber, other common rooms, and student rooms. The south half was dorm rooms and apartments.

In those early years, the university was not well-funded. Each new building required approval of funds from the Wisconsin legislature, and in its eagerness to educate and to show that the new state of Wisconsin was on a par with Michigan, the university often overextended itself. "The $20,000 cost of [South Hall] so crippled the University at the time that the purchase of books and apparatus had to be temporarily discontinued and the curriculum limited." Most of the university faculty moved into South Hall with their families, paying roughly $3 per week per person for room and board. Boarding students paid $2 per week. Professor and Mrs. Sterling managed the boarding establishment. Classics professor James Butler later wrote warmly of this era where students and faculty lived close together:

"Through my classes came William Vilas, John C. Spooner, John Muir, Levi Vilas, Dwight Treadway and both the Steins. No foresight or second sight showed me to what acmes these youths were destined to climb. So while entertaining angels unawares, I very composedly eked out their shortcomings, and detected their blunders, like those of ordinary mortals."

In 1856 a Normal School (teacher training) was started in South Hall. When many male students left for the Civil War, women were allowed in to keep the university afloat, and many of them lodged in South Hall starting in 1864. In that year, 119 of the 169 students in the Normal School Department were women, with 229 students in the whole university.

In the early years the curriculum of the university focused on geography, English grammar, Latin and Greek. That curriculum shifted to more practical subjects as years passed. Particularly with the Morrill Act of 1862, the UW began offering instruction in "the agricultural and mechanical arts." In 1884 South Hall became home to the Department of Agriculture and was renamed Agriculture Hall. In 1890 in this building, Stephen Babcock developed the Babcock test for milk fat content.

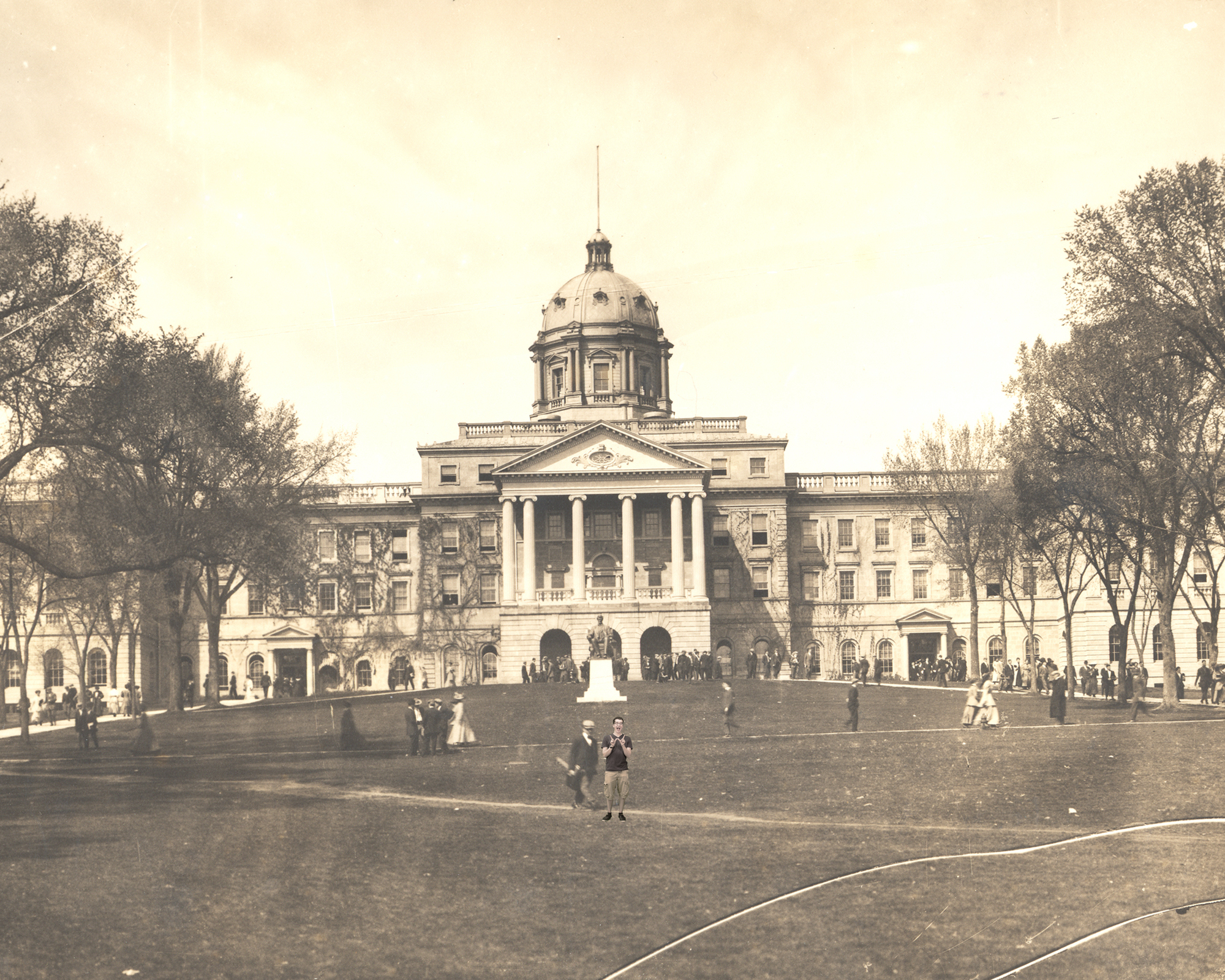
Bascom Hall with the new entry and dome, between 1895 and 1916

=== Bascom Hall (1857) ===
What is now called Bascom Hall was the university's third major building, filling that prominent central spot which had been called "Main Edifice" on the early plan. The building was designed by Indianapolis architect William Tinsley in Italian Renaissance Revival style, and initially looked as shown in the 1885 drawing - quite different from today - smaller, with the center topped with a tall dome and a semi-circular colonnade facing the capitol. Tinsley's own biographer observed that it was "a handsome and dignified if somewhat pompous, edifice." It was built from 1857 to 1859, and was the first UW building used entirely for instruction. Like South Hall, the building of Bascom left the university financially stressed for years. The building had problems from the start due to inadequate funding, including leaks, drafts, and poor ventilation. In the first years, students built small fires on the basement floor to keep warm.

In early years Bascom Hall was called Main Hall, University Hall, and Old Main. In 1894 the original semi-circular portico was replaced with the current Jeffersonian portico and the dome was enlarged. Wings were added to expand the building in 1899, 1907 and 1926. The Lincoln sculpture was added in front in 1909, a copy of Adolph Weinman's statue in Hodgenville, Kentucky. In 1920 the building's name was changed to Bascom Hall to honor the former UW president.

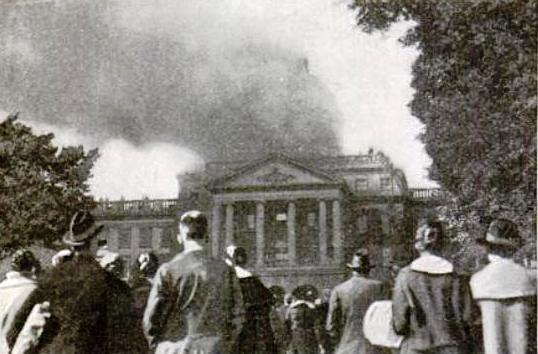
Bascom Hall on fire in 1916

When the Wisconsin State Capitol building was rebuilt after being damaged by fire in 1906, the state government donated the old Capitol's dome to the university to be placed on top of Main Hall, but it was determined that the dome was too heavy for the building to support. The Capitol dome laid behind Main Hall until it was sold for scrap in 1915. The building's own dome was destroyed by a fire on October 10, 1916. Engineering students tried to douse the fire, but the firehoses were rotten. The rest of the building was saved only when the burning dome collapsed into a forgotten water tank beneath. The dome was never rebuilt.

=== Ladies Hall (1870, replaced) ===
Enrollment increased after the Civil War and by the late 1860s the UW's three buildings were again packed. President Chadbourne, who resisted coeducation of women with men, and his administration put it this way: "We need for the young men every particle of room occupied by the young ladies, and to this end, we are in immediate want of a building to use as a Female college." In 1870 the legislature granted the funds, Chicago architect G.P. Randall designed a 3-story building on a raised basement clad in stone, just where Chadbourne Hall sits now, with dorm rooms in one wing and recitation rooms in the other. Women moved in for the 1871–72 school year. It was the first UW building with indoor privies, and the first coed dorm at a public university in the U.S.

In 1895-1896 a gymnasium wing was added, and elevators and electric lighting, and the rooms were remodeled, expanding the dorm's capacity to 125. In 1901 Ladies Hall was officially renamed Chadbourne Hall, in ironic honor of the UW president who got it built while opposing coeducation. In 1957 the old building was razed and replaced by the new Chadbourne Hall, which is not included in the Bascom Hill Historic District.

=== Old Science Hall (1877, destroyed) ===
By the 1870s Main Hall (now Bascom) was jam-packed with classrooms, labs and students. More instructional space was needed. Henry C. Koch of Milwaukee designed a four-story U-shaped building clad in Madison sandstone and styled Italianate, located where the new Science Hall now stands. It housed labs and shops in the first floor/basement, chemistry and physics on the second floor, civil engineering and geology on the third, and natural history on the fourth, with an art gallery at the front. It even had flush toilets. After only seven years of use, a fire started in December 1884, possibly in a forge room, and fire suppression plans failed. The whole building burned.

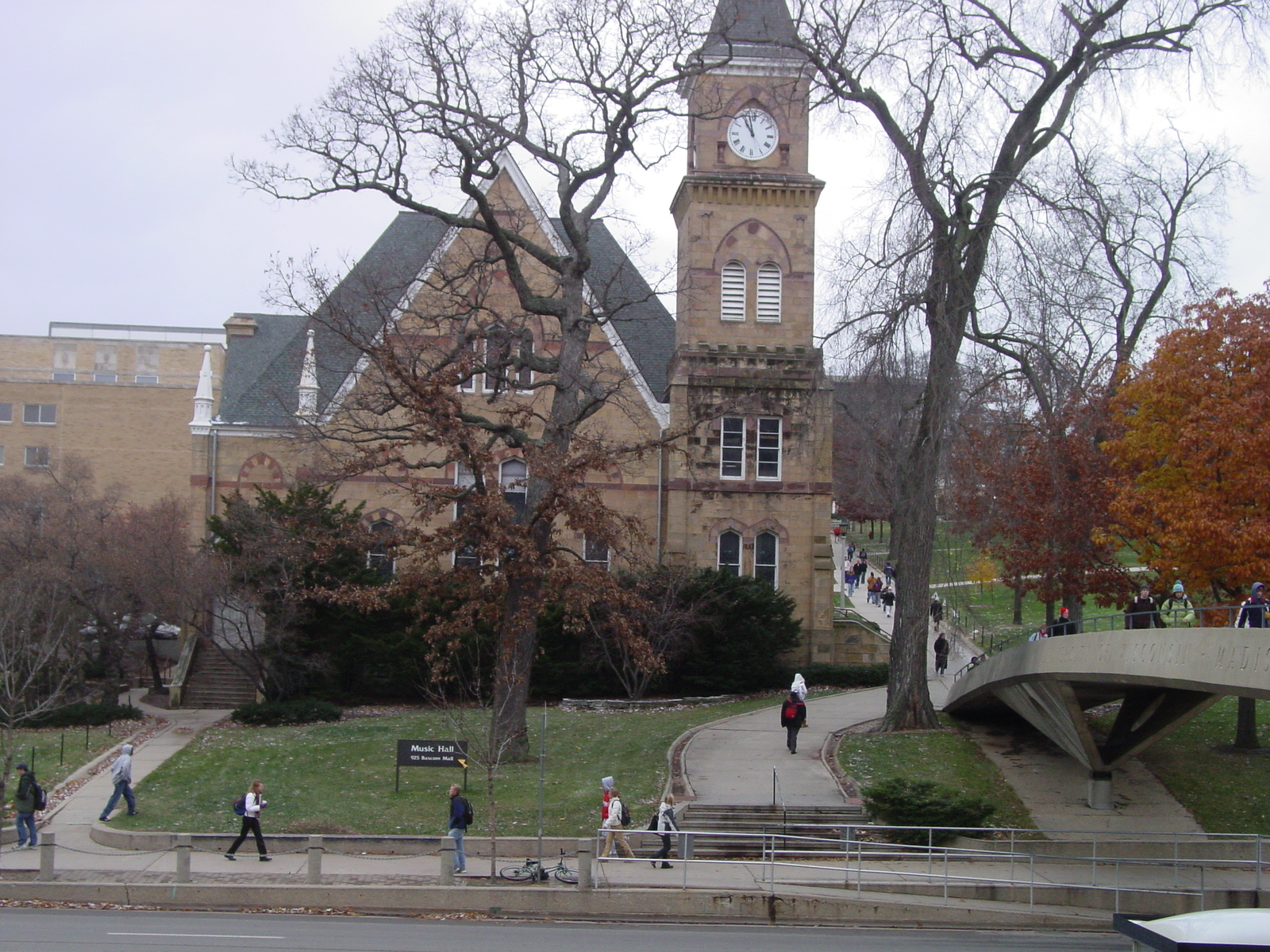
Music Hall

=== Music Hall (1879) ===
While the 1877 Science Hall still existed, leaders felt the university's greatest need was a space large enough for the whole student body to assemble. The university also needed a better place for a library, and again had some funds to work with. University President Bascom engaged Madison architect David R. Jones, who designed a dramatic building with a large square corner clock tower, with walls of Madison sandstone (quarried at what is now Hoyt Park) trimmed with darker Superior brownstone, with corner buttresses and pinnacles, and with gently pointed windows filled with stained glass created by George A. Misch of Chicago. The general style is Gothic Revival (emphasis on the vertical), and the building looks like a church without the Christian iconography.

The building was initially called Assembly Hall, and the auditorium was used for "lectures, plays, recitals, operas, and concerts." But after some confusion between "Assembly Hall" and the "Assembly chamber" one mile away, the name was changed to Library Hall. The hall's "good acoustics and pleasant setting made it ideal for the frequent literary society debates and free lectures series, both well attended by Madison residents." By 1900, events with large crowds could be held at the Red Gym, so the Music Department moved into Library Hall and the name eventually became Music Hall. Over the years, the auditorium has hosted Governor Robert La Follette, John F. Kennedy, Frank Lloyd Wright, the introduction of On, Wisconsin! by its authors in 1909, the Pro Arte Quartet, and Aaron Copland. In 1969 most of the School of Music moved out, but the Opera Department stayed behind and has staged opera productions in the auditorium.

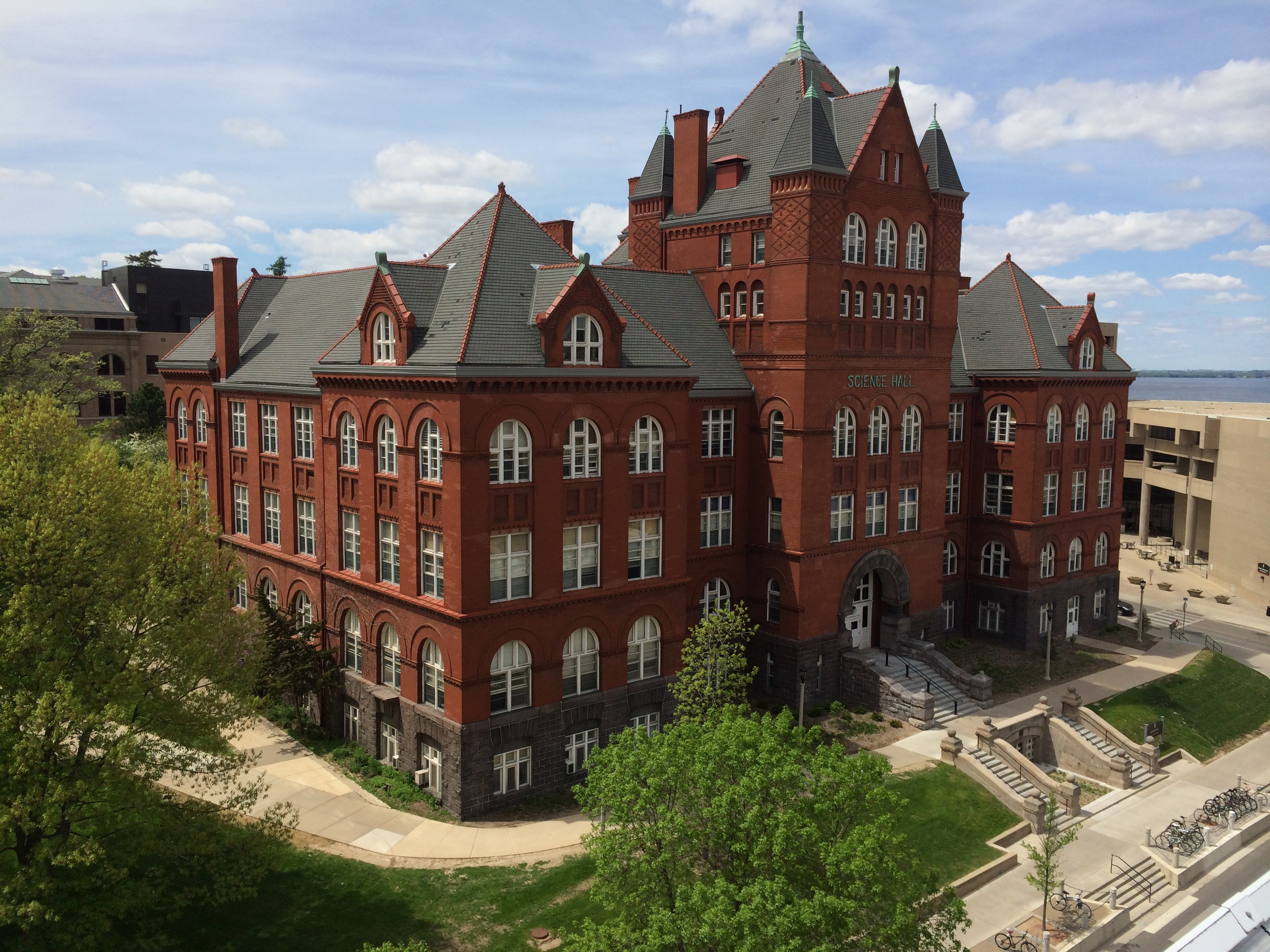
Science Hall in 2014

=== Science Hall (1885–1888) ===
After the first Science Hall was destroyed by fire in December 1884, the legislature approved funds to supplement the insurance money to build a new Science Hall on the same location. H.C. Koch designed this building too, with a U-shaped footprint like before, but this time the style was Romanesque Revival. True to the style, the basement wall and lower trim were rusticated rhyolite quarried near New Berlin, the walls red brick, the openings round-arched, the roof complex and hipped, originally sporting a profusion of tall corbelled chimneys. The building is symmetric with a massive 5-story tower centered over the main entrance - a castle crossed with a shoe factory. All construction bids came in higher than the regents wanted, so they appointed Allan Conover, one of the university's own professors of civil engineering, as general contractor. Professor Conover changed the design to reduce risk of another fire, replacing Koch's "slow-burning" wood framework and load-bearing walls with a steel skeleton and hollow clay tile. The steel in particular was progressive, as Science Hall was only the second building in the U.S. with a steel framework. The building ended up costing $285,000, far above the initial estimates, and requests for more funds prompted an uproar and legislative hearings, but the fireproofing changes were hard to argue with, and it was determined that the initial estimates had been unrealistic.

Move-in was in 1888. Engineering and Physics had the first floor, with shops, labs, a museum, reading room, and a 100-seat auditorium. Mineralogy and Geology were on the second floor. Biological sciences (zoology, anatomy, botany, biology) were on the third floor. Generally, each floor had a museum in the south wing, a lecture hall in the central tower, and various labs in the north wing. Before there was an elevator, one of the rear towers housed a winch which lifted cadavers to the third floor anatomy labs, on their way to the attic for dissections.

Nationally prominent geologist Charles Van Hise worked in Science Hall. He was "the first in the nation to apply microscopic lithology to an extensive study of crystalline rocks, and to use those results in the formulation of geologic principles." Van Hise was also an early champion of conservation of natural resources. Other notable scientists worked in the building, but it was particularly for the association with Van Hise's work on geology that Science Hall was named a National Historic Landmark in 1994.

=== Radio Hall (1887) ===
Just up the hill from Science Hall, the low-slung building with the big chimney was built in 1887 to house the university's central heating plant. After the first Science Hall burned in 1884, the university's planners decided to split some fire-prone functions out of the new Science Hall into separate buildings. They moved the forges which were suspect in the 1884 fire to machine shops where Helen White sits today, and they moved the furnaces to this building. It generated steam, which was piped through tunnels to the new Science Hall, and later to the 1892 law building and other buildings. The heating plant was designed by H.C. Koch, who also designed both Science Halls. He covered it in cut stone, with segmental arches over many openings, and one chimney. In the 1890s it was extended 70 feet to the south with a second chimney. The university continued to grow, and in 1908 built a new central heating plant south of University Ave.

With the old heating plant free, the new Mining Engineering department moved in, remodeling the building to make assaying labs and ore dressing rooms. Mining stayed in the building until about 1931.

The building is now called Radio Hall because the university's pioneering radio station WHA moved in from Sterling Hall in 1934 and operated here until 1972, when it moved to Vilas Hall. Again the building was remodeled, with labor provided by the New Deal Civil Works Administration and the Federal Emergency Relief Administration. As part of the remodel, they built an interior room mounted on springs to reduce vibrations while recording. Funded by the National Youth Administration, WHA hired students to decorate the lobby with art showing old means of communication: the copies of petroglyphs from around Wisconsin, the carved Indian drums in the light fixtures by John Gallagher, and the mural showing the early days of radio at Madison by John Stella. Around the same time, Professor McCarty asked Frank Lloyd Wright for advice on remodeling the outside of the building, but after a pause Wright replied, "Don't touch it, my boy. It's one of the two honest buildings in Madison."

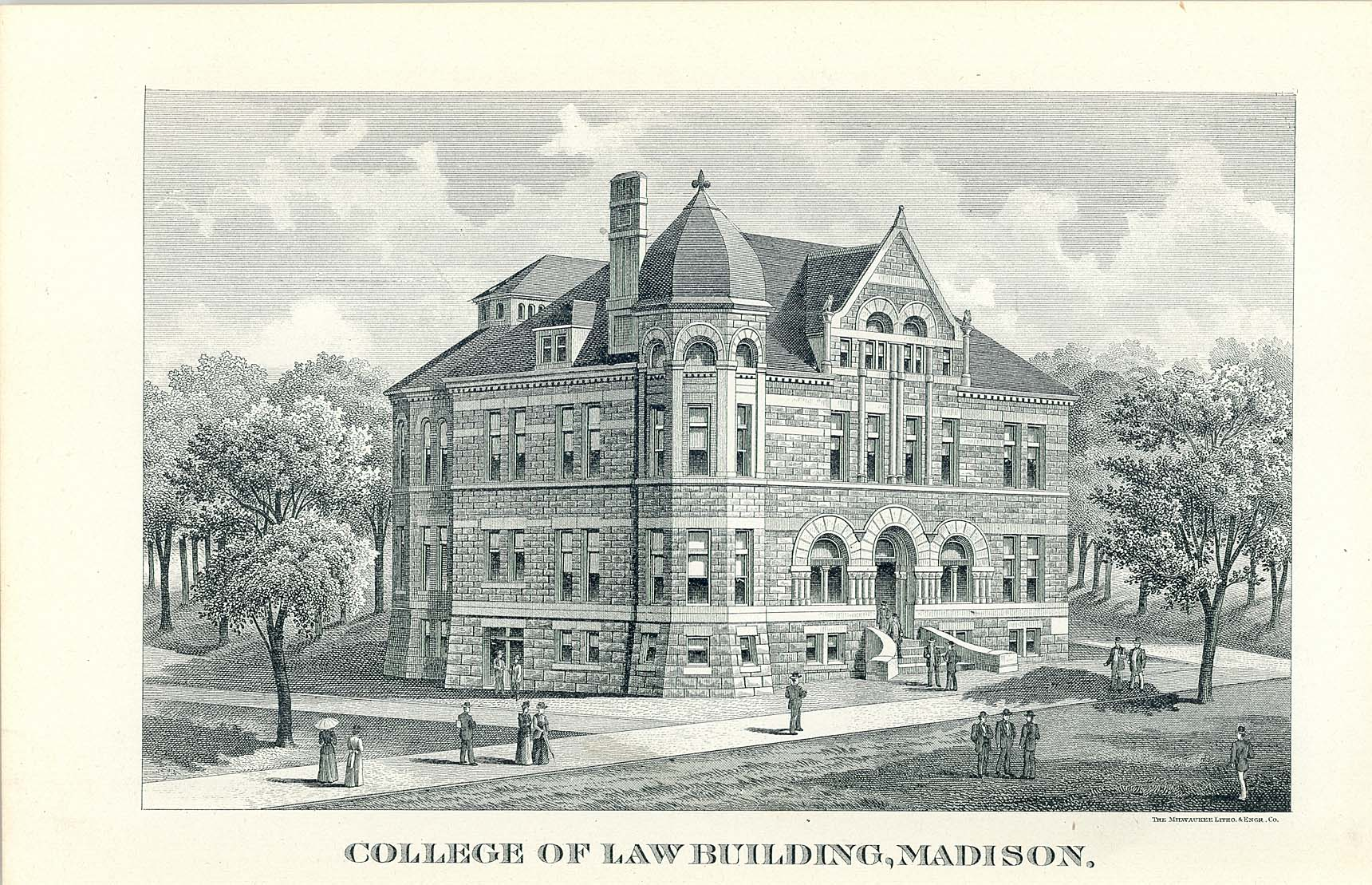
1893 engraving of the old Law building

=== Old Law Building (1891, replaced) ===
Prior to 1891, the UW's law department was variously located in the state capitol, above a saloon and in Bascom Hall. In 1891 the UW finally built a home for the law school - a Victorian brownstone designed by Charles Sumner Frost between South Hall and Music Hall. In 1939 the UW began adding to the building until in 1963 the last of the 1891 building was taken down, leaving only its cornerstone and a gargoyle near the entrance of the new University of Wisconsin Law School building. The new building is not included in the NRHP's Bascom Hill Historic District.

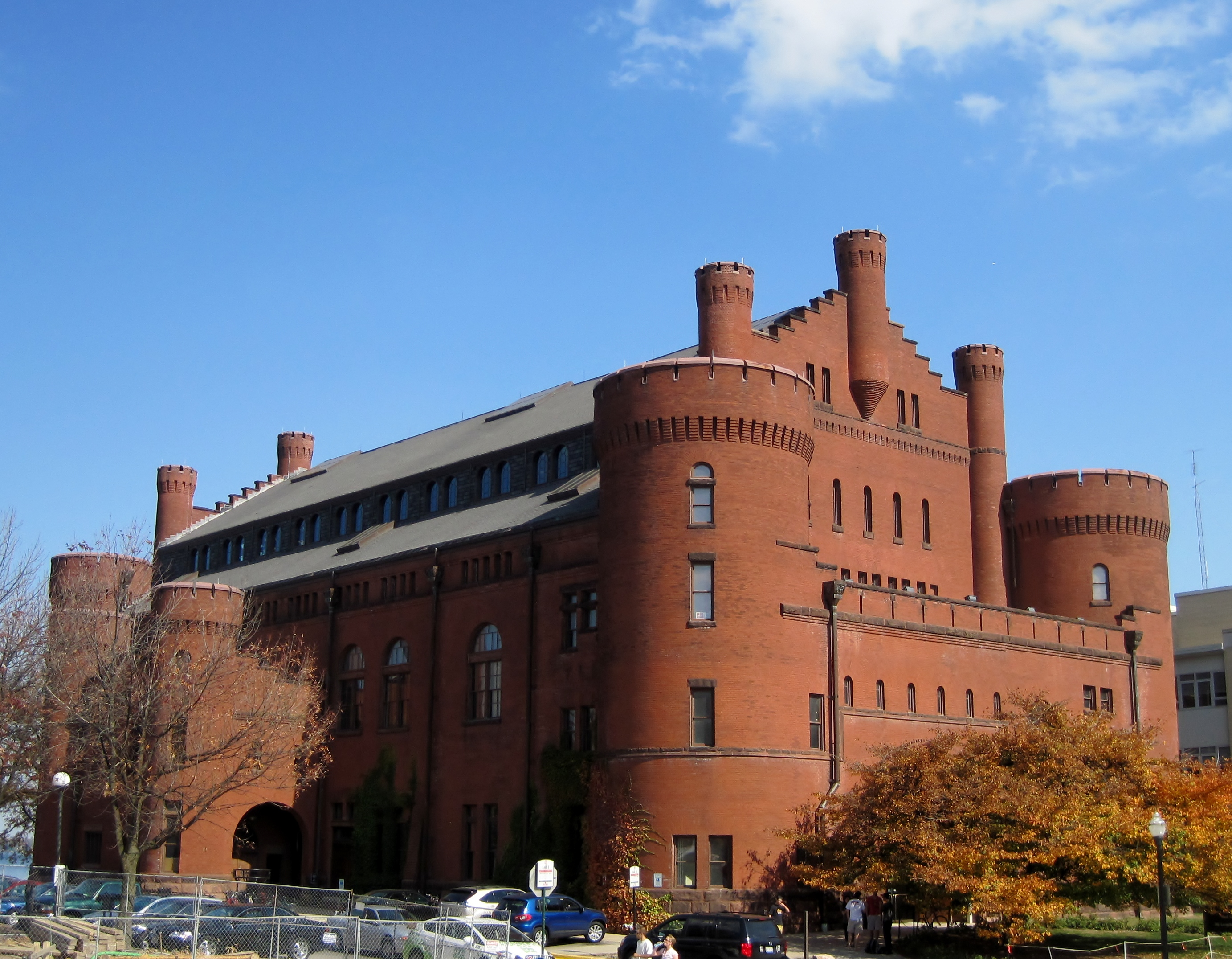
Armory and Gymnasium, a.k.a. the Red Gym

=== Armory and Gymnasium (1894) ===
The Red Gym isn't on Bascom Hill, but it is a contributing property to the Bascom Hill Historic District, and the NRHP nomination considers it "perhaps the most significant historical site in the District." Combining an armory with a gym may seem a bit odd today, but the UW had a military department in the years after the Civil War, and in 1870 built a wooden structure for military drill and gymnastics practice near where the carillon tower now stands. After it burned in 1891, there was need for a replacement. Meanwhile, some in the state legislature wanted to construct an armory in Madison to be ready in case of civil disturbances like the Haymarket Riot in Chicago less than ten years earlier.

Allan Conover and Lew Porter designed a fortress-like structure with turrets and towers with corbels and battlements, in red brick trimmed with sandstone. The first floor initially held the commandant's office, the artillery drill room, bowling alleys and a swimming pool. The second held a large drill hall/basketball court/assembly hall with a 43-foot ceiling. The third held the gymnasium, with a baseball cage, gymnastics equipment, rowing machines, two 160-foot rifle ranges, and a 440-yard track. Over the years the assembly hall hosted William McKinley, William Jennings Bryan, Eugene Debs, and Upton Sinclair, championship basketball games, Pablo Casals, John Philip Souza, and the New York Symphony Orchestra.

The Red Gym's primary historical significance came when it hosted the state Republican convention in 1904, in which Robert La Follette's Progressive Republicans took control of the state party from the Stalwart (conservative) Republicans, securing a majority in the state legislature and making way for reforms like the direct primary in Wisconsin, which was later adopted by other states. For this, the Red Gym was designated a National Historic Landmark.

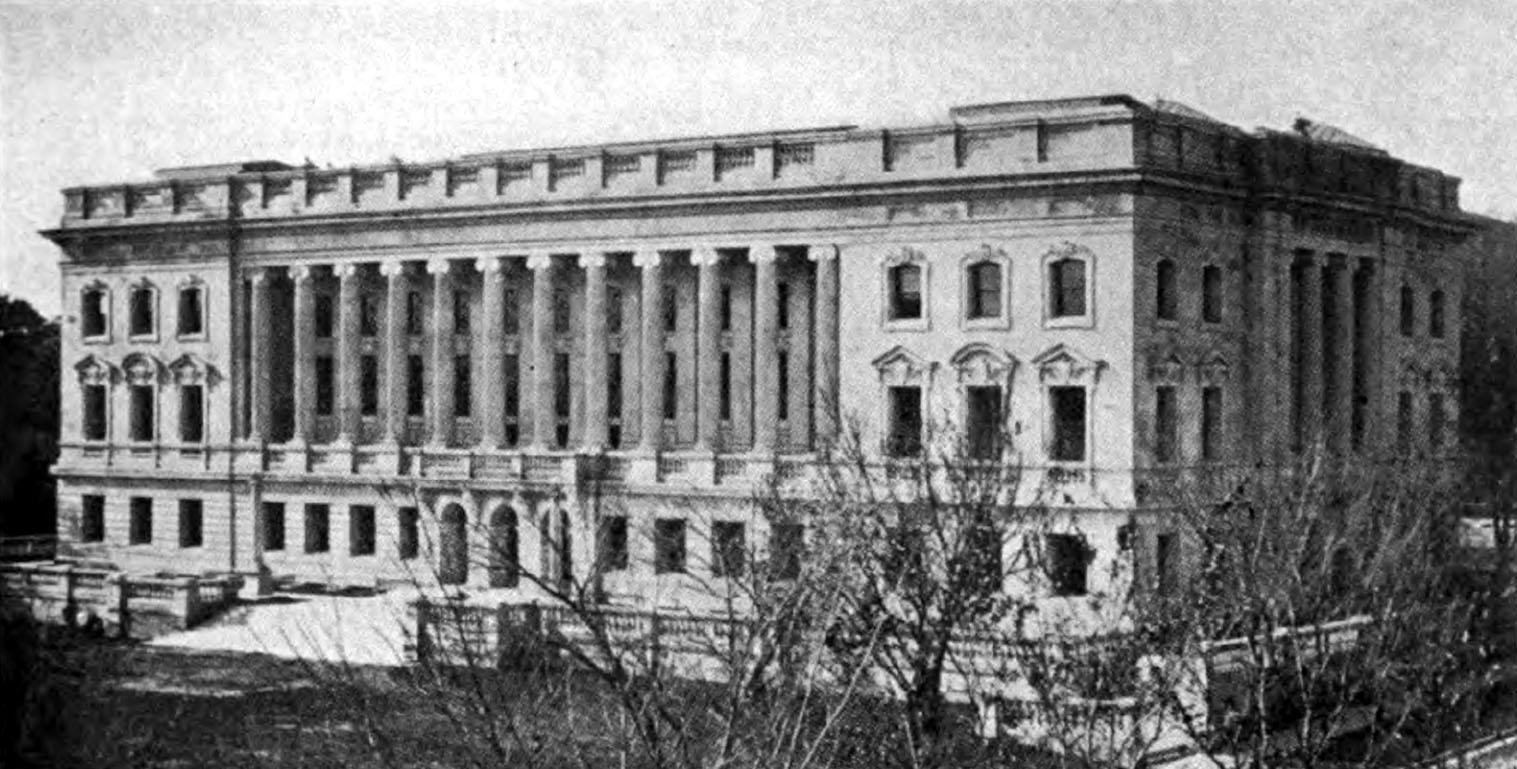
Library shared by university and State Historical Society, around 1920

=== State Historical Society (1900) ===
The university's library had a good home in Assembly/Library Hall when it was built in 1879, but by the 1890s the library's books had overflowed into basements around campus. Meanwhile, the State Historical Society's collection - much of it irreplaceable - was jammed into the capitol building where it was vulnerable to fire. From 1895 to 1899 the state legislature approved funds for a shared building to solve both problems.

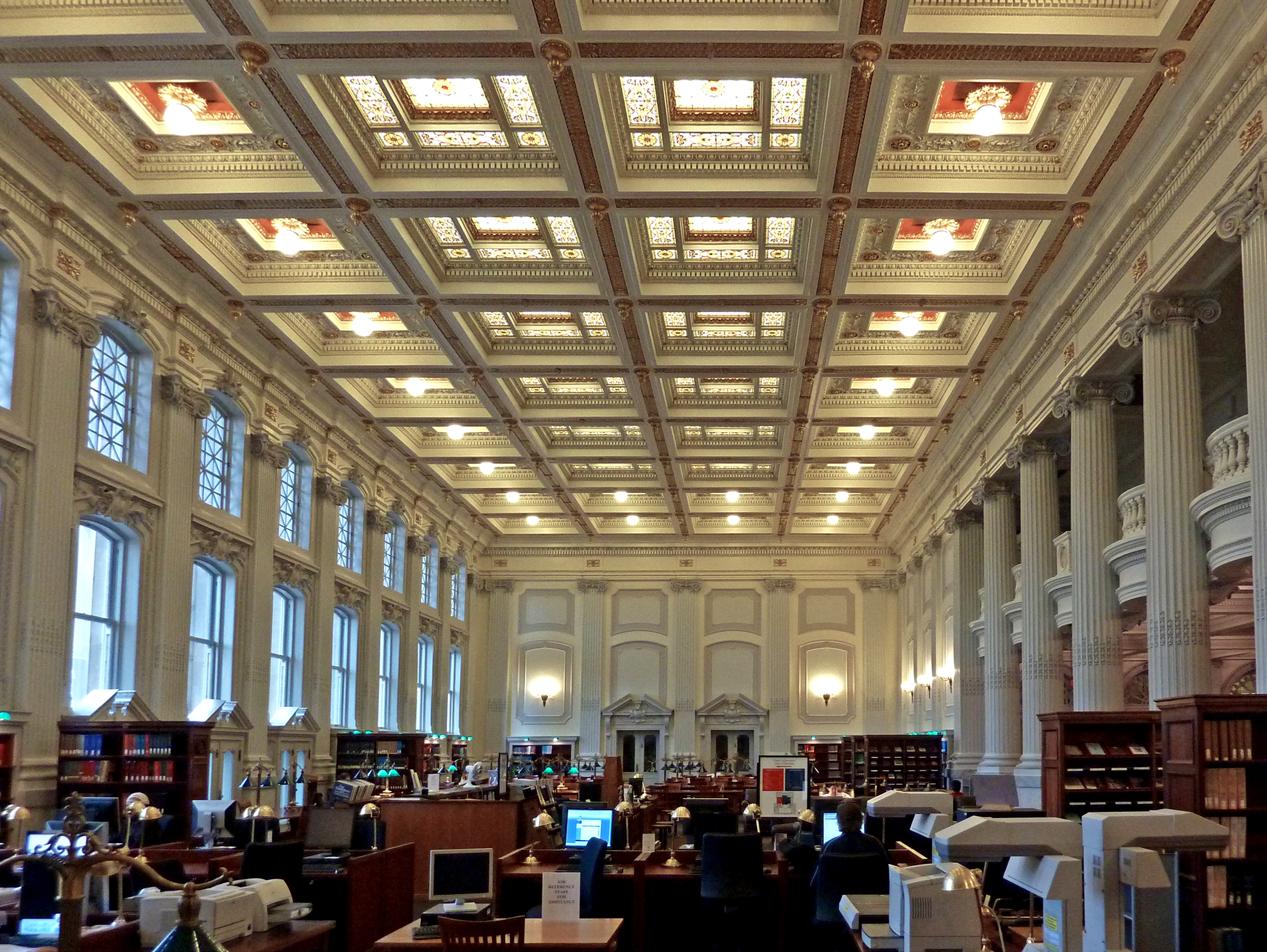
Historical Society reading room, 2010

Milwaukee architects Ferry & Clas designed the new building in Neoclassical style, with a broad Ionic colonnaded portico, and exterior of Bedford limestone. Inside are mosaic tile floors, marble staircases, and a large reading room. The building's footprint was U-shaped, with the historical society's stacks in the south end and the university's stacks in the north. In 1952 the university's library moved to the new Memorial Library building across the square and the Historical Society expanded to take over the entire building.

=== Old Education Building (1901) ===
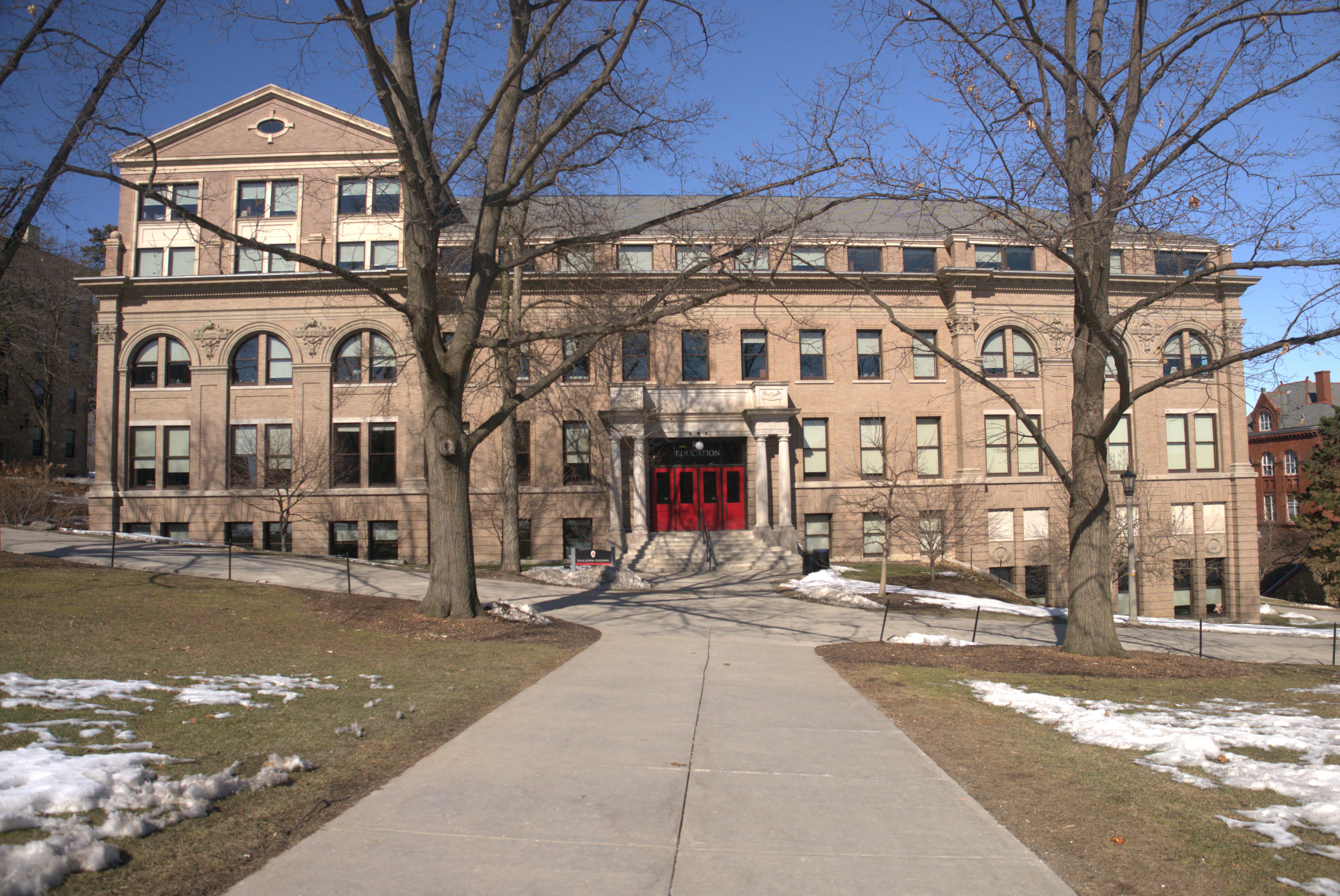
Old Education

Between North Hall and Science Hall is a Beaux Arts-style structure built in 1901 to house the College of Engineering. When outside architects didn't submit a satisfactory design and the need for a building was urgent, some of the engineering faculty designed their own building in a month and got the first section built in under a year. By 1933 Engineering had outgrown the building. Engineering moved to new buildings on the west side of campus, and the Education department moved in.

=== Birge Hall (1912) ===
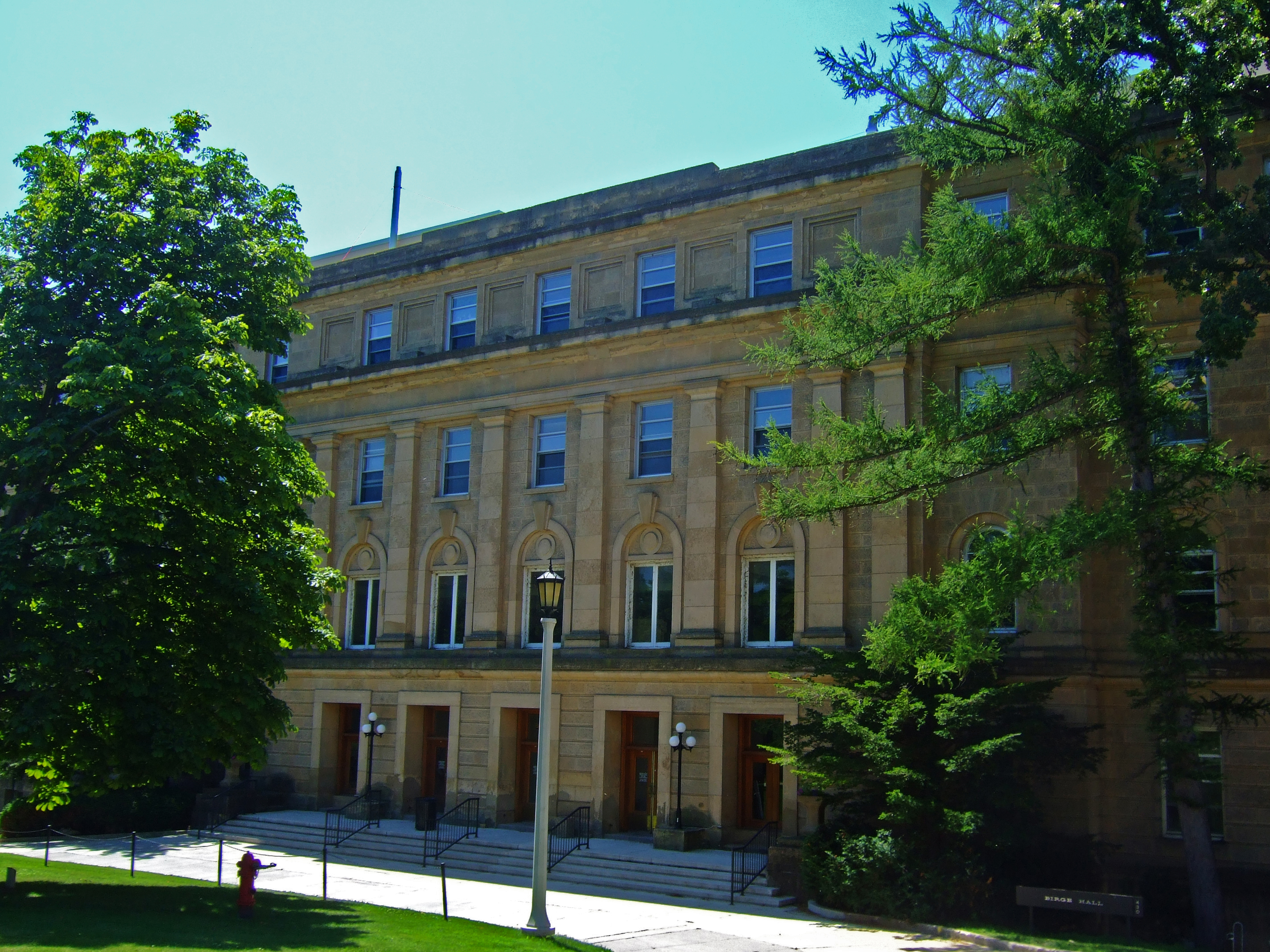
Birge in 2001

Growing science programs had driven Engineering to move to its own building in 1901, and they continued to grow. In 1905 the Dean of L&S Edward Birge recommended a new Biology building to relieve crowding in Science Hall. State architect Arthur Peabody and Jarvis Hunt of Chicago designed a 5-story Neoclassical-styled structure behind Bascom and South Hall. It was completed in 1912, and initially called the Botany building. Wisconsin Alumni Magazine described entering from the Bascom mall side and seeing:

...biological specimens of general interest which fills most of the ground floor of the main building. Passing straight through the museum doors on both sides open into the auditorium, which seats about four hundred. There are two floors below this, the basement, which contained the department of plant physiology, and the sub-basement containing labs and work rooms which opened directly into the greenhouses to the south of the auditorium. Staircases from the museum give access to the upper floors, which housed research labs, chart and dark rooms, a herbarium, offices, lecture rooms, a library and Prof. Owen's butterfly collection.

In 1950 the building was renamed Birge Hall a week after Edward Birge died. Wings were added in 1956 and 1980.

=== Memorial Union (1928) ===
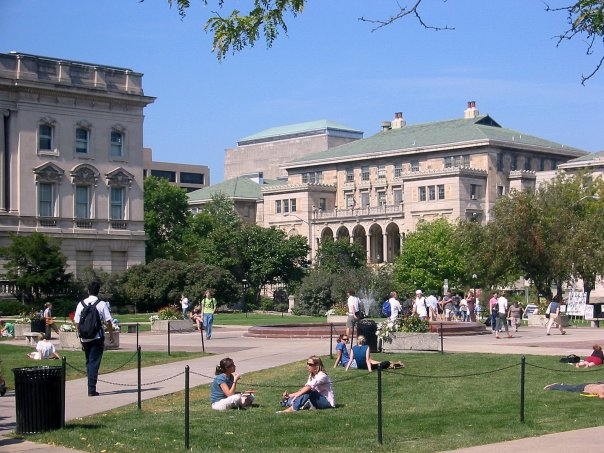
Memorial Union at right, Historical Society at left

By the 1900s there were calls for the university to have a "campus living room" like Oxford or Cambridge, or Ann Arbor. A student union organization was formed in 1907, located in a floor of the old YMCA next to the Red Gym, but in 1916 the drinking and uproar led the Y to end the arrangement, and the union shifted to other temporary quarters. In 1918 regent Walter Kohler initiated a fund-raising campaign for a union building. By 1926 they had raised just enough to start, and broke ground for a foundation.

The lowest construction bid came from Jacob Pfeffer of Duluth, which led to trouble because he operated an open shop. In 1927 union workers left work and picketed in protest of the non-union workers. Police didn't intervene and things deteriorated until on May 20 a group of 200 union supporters attacked Pfeffer's workers, beating them and throwing some in the lake. Bones were broken and one man lost an eye. After more violence, public opinion shifted against the union and the courts and police stepped in.

Memorial Union opened in October 1928. Arthur Peabody had designed a 4-story Italian Renaissance Revival structure with walls of Bedford limestone and a green tile roof. Leon Pescheret and his wife designed the interior. German immigrant Eugene Hausler painted the murals in the Rathskeller and Stiftskeller. Peabody's daughter Charlotte designed the terrace facing Lake Mendota. The Wisconsin Union Theater wing was added in 1938, designed in Moderne style by Michael Hare and Paul Cret.

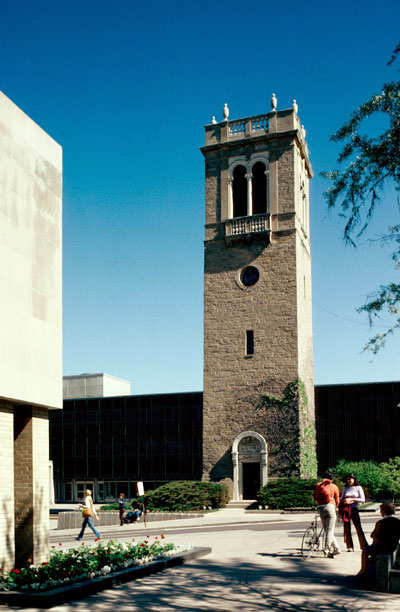
Carillon tower

=== Carillon Tower (1934) ===
After the Bascom Hall fire in 1916, the class of 1917 began raising funds to rebuild the dome on Bascom Hall, with the idea of adding chimes inside. Subsequent classes pitched in on the fund-raising, and by the 1930s had enough money to proceed, but state architect Arthur Peabody didn't favor rebuilding the dome on Bascom, for both engineering and aesthetic reasons. Instead, the idea shifted to building a free-standing structure that would hold chimes. The Carillon Tower northwest of Bascom Hall is the result.

Warren Laird and Paul Cret designed the 85-foot sandstone tower so that the balustrade echoes that on Bascom Hall. Inside is the carillon, an instrument where a keyboardist rings tuned bronze bells. At the dedication concert in 1936, carillonneur Ira Schroeder played On Wisconsin and Drink to Me Only With Thine Eyes, among other songs.

Today the carillon has 56 bells, with the largest 6,800 pounds. An automated system rings bells on the hour, playing songs such as “Varsity” and “On, Wisconsin!”. On most summer Sundays a human carillonneur provides a free concert for the public.

=== Humanities Building and Elvehjem (1969) ===
Enrollment grew in the years after World War II. New buildings for the sciences were funded by federal money for science education and funds from WARF, but many humanities subjects like history and art were left scattered across older buildings like Bascom Hall. In 1959 the History Building Committee expressed their frustration: "The map situation in the department is deplorable.... We need a building."

The university selected prominent Chicago architect Harry Weese to lead the design of a solution. Rather than the three towers (history, music and art) that had previously been considered and which would have visually blocked the old buildings on Bascom Hill from the city, Weese proposed a single lower structure at the foot of Bascom Hill, with landscaped green space around. As feedback came in, more space was needed, and the building grew to fill much of the green space. Costs had to be cut, finishes cheapened, and the inner courtyards filled with stone rather than green landscaping. The building opened in 1969 to mixed reviews. The exterior is in a modern architectural style called Brutalist. The building still has problems with leaks, heating and acoustics, and is slated to be replaced around 2030.

The Elvehejm Art Center, now called the Chazen Museum of Art, was built at the same time, also designed by Weese, in similar style. It was better funded by donations and is nicely finished, giving an idea of what the Humanities building might have been.

=== Muir Woods ===
Northwest of North Hall where John Muir lived, and running down the hill to Lake Mendota, remains a 7-acre tract of woods where Muir no doubt rambled in his free time.

In 1959 the woods was involved in a controversy when the UW decided to take a bite out of it for the Sociology-Anthropology-Economics Building - a controversy that roused protest from various quarters, including Aldo Leopold's widow and Frank Lloyd Wright, who wrote of the regents' plan:

...This determination to cut into the fine remaining forest for some expedient building is going to prove to subsequent generations that 'regentry' need be neither scholar nor gentleman...

The Social Sciences building went forward, but the uproar marked a turning point for university planners.

== See also ==
- North Hall (University of Wisconsin)
- University of Wisconsin Science Hall
- University of Wisconsin Armory and Gymnasium
- Wisconsin Historical Society
- Memorial Union (Wisconsin)
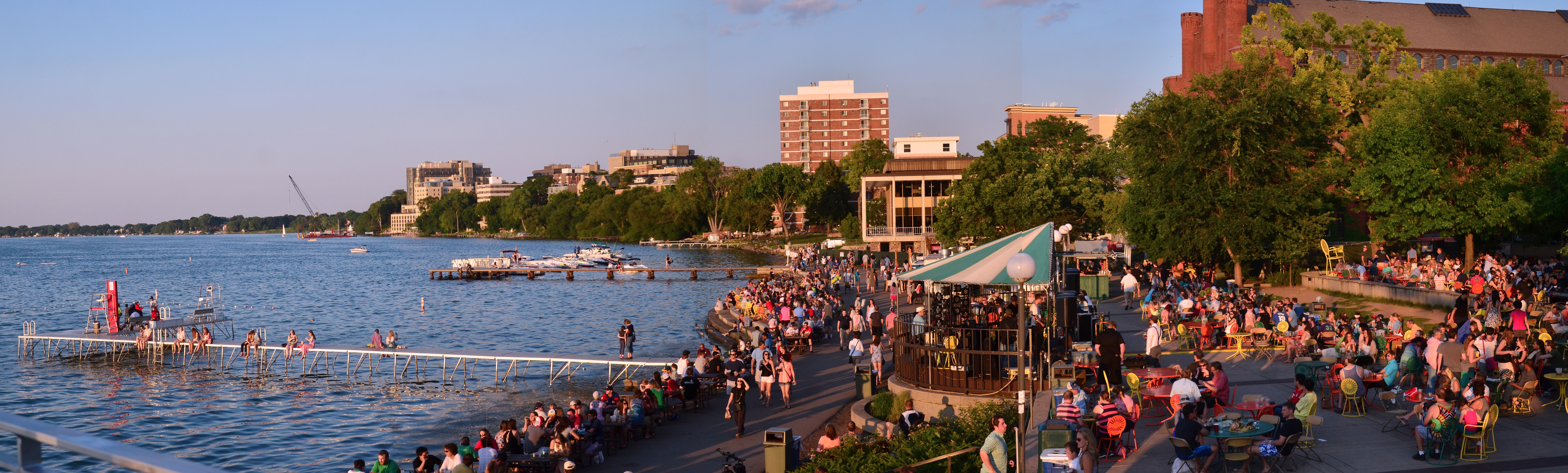
Weekend crowd on Union Terrace in June 2015
