= John F. Rague =

American architect

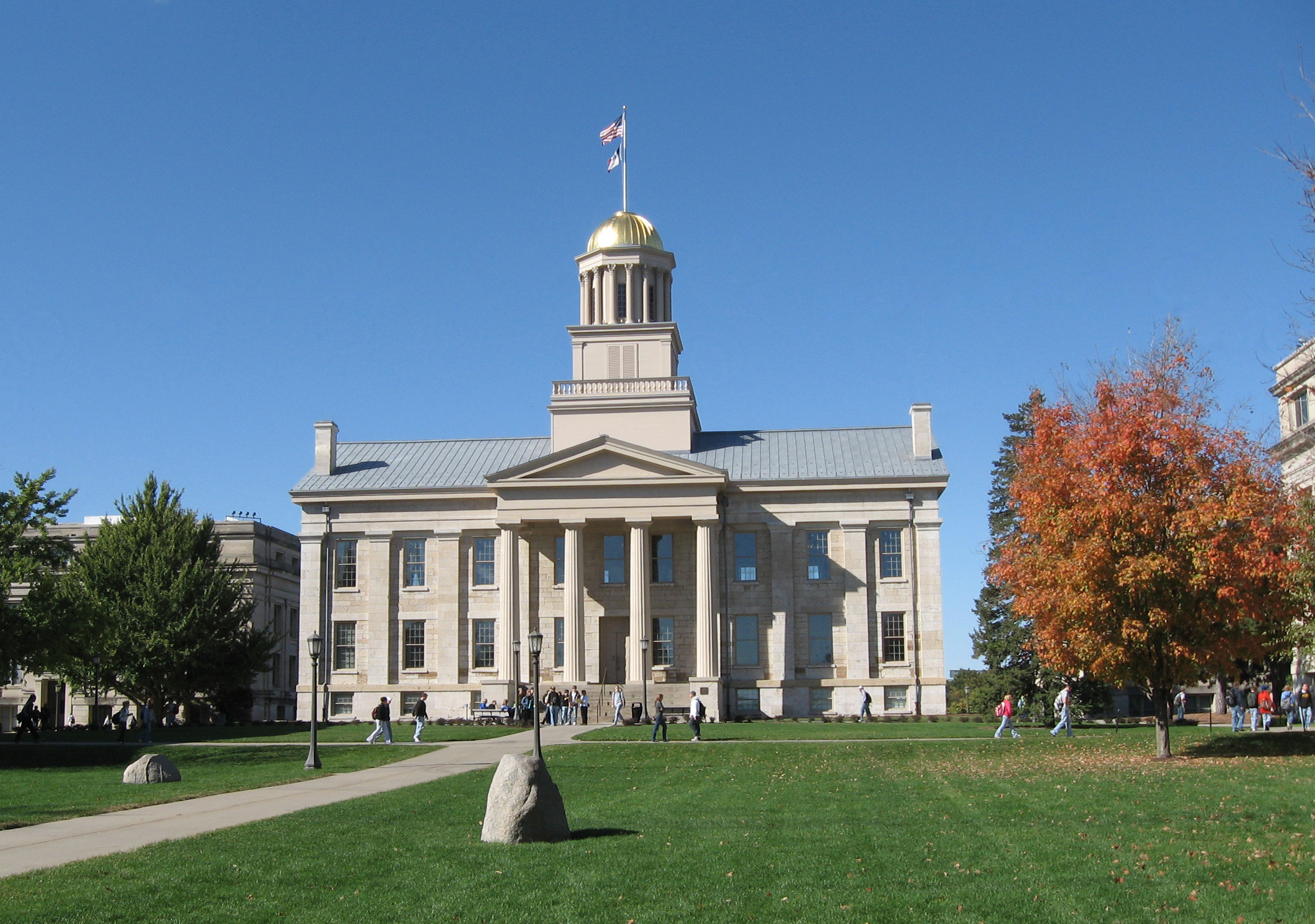
1840 Territorial Capitol of Iowa.

John Francis Rague (1799–1877; pronounced ra-gu) was a mid-19th century architect who designed and built numerous public buildings including the 1837 Old Capitol of Illinois and the 1840 Territorial Capitol of Iowa. He was born on March 24, 1799, in Scotch Plains, New Jersey, before the family moved to New York in 1806. There he studied under Minard Lafever.

He would later move to Springfield, Illinois in 1831. There, he designed both the Illinois and Iowa capitol buildings, the Tinsley Dry Goods Building and many Greek Revival homes. In Springfield, Rague was a friend of Abraham Lincoln, and suggested Lincoln wear white gloves to dinner parties. Lincoln followed this recommendation.

By 1848, Rague was one of the first architects in Milwaukee, Wisconsin, where he is known for designing the Phoenix Building, as well as the initial plan for the Bascom Hall, North Hall, and South Hall at the University of Wisconsin-Madison.

In 1854, Rague moved to Dubuque, Iowa. While there, he designed a number of buildings, including the city hall, Central Market House, the jail and many homes such as the Mathias Ham House, and the Langworthy Octagon House. Rague's style varied widely over his career from Neoclassical to Federalist to Late Victorian and even to Egyptian Revival.

== Gallery of Rague-designed buildings ==
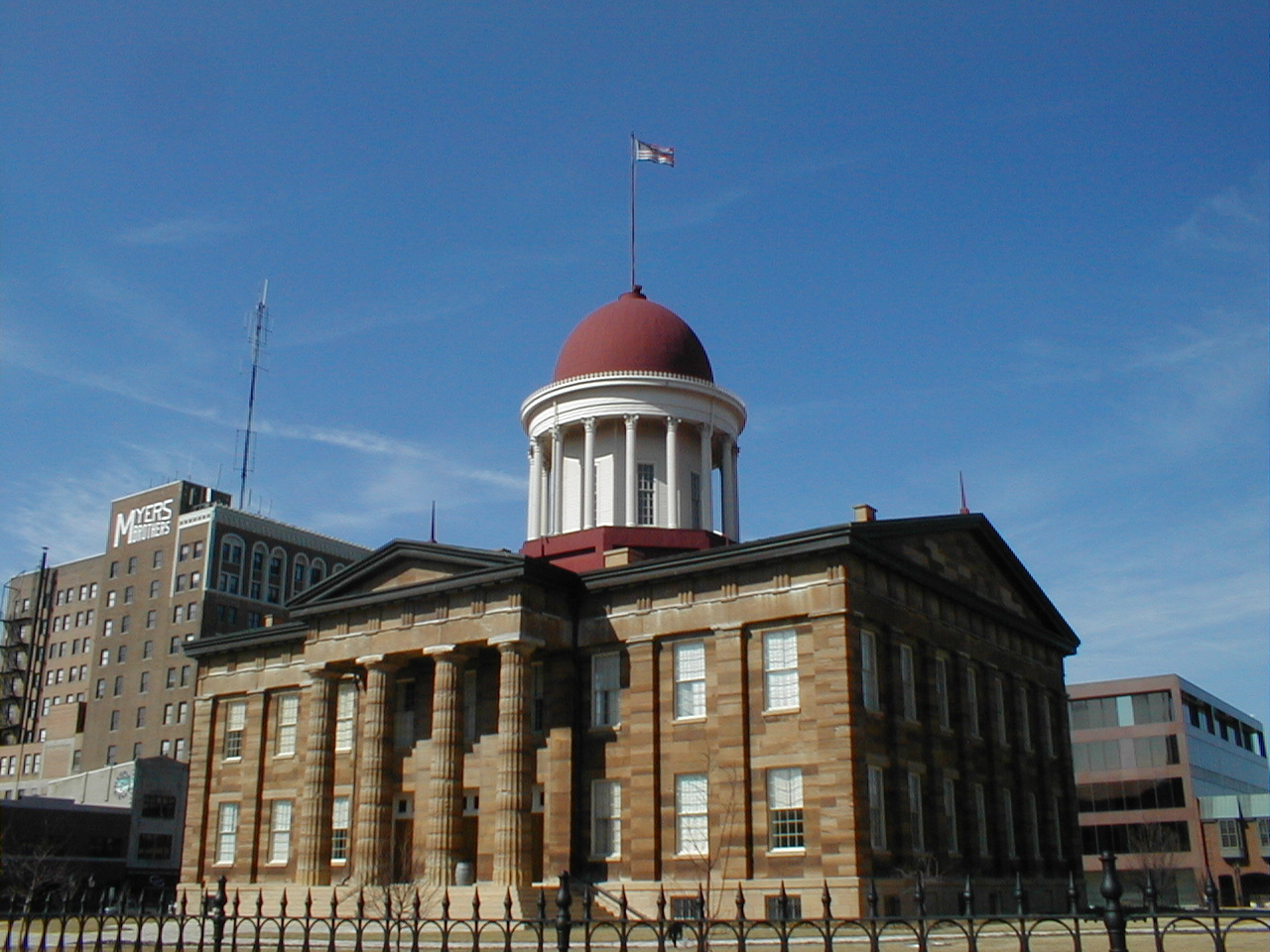
1839 Old Capitol of Illinois

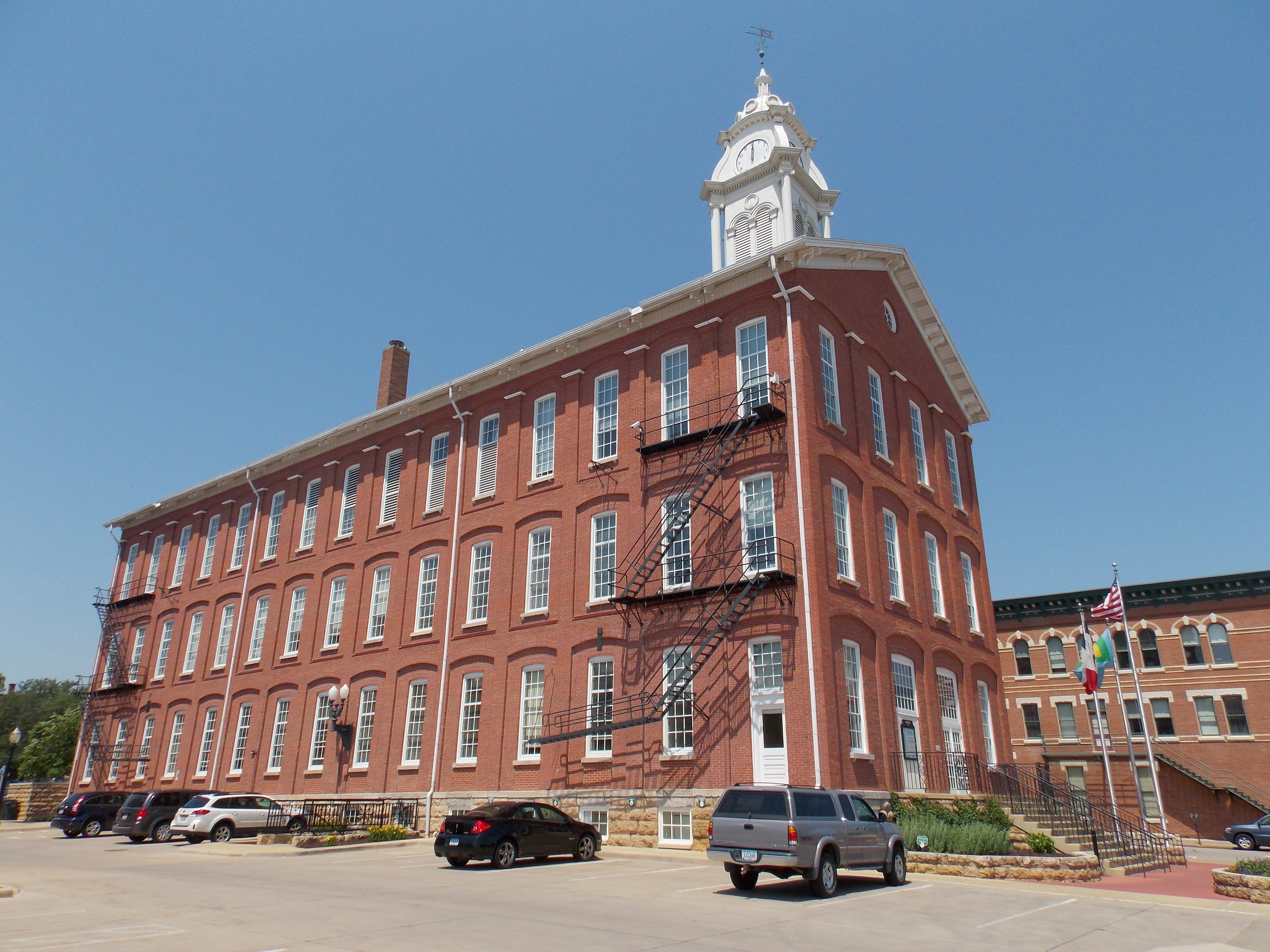
1857 Dubuque City Hall

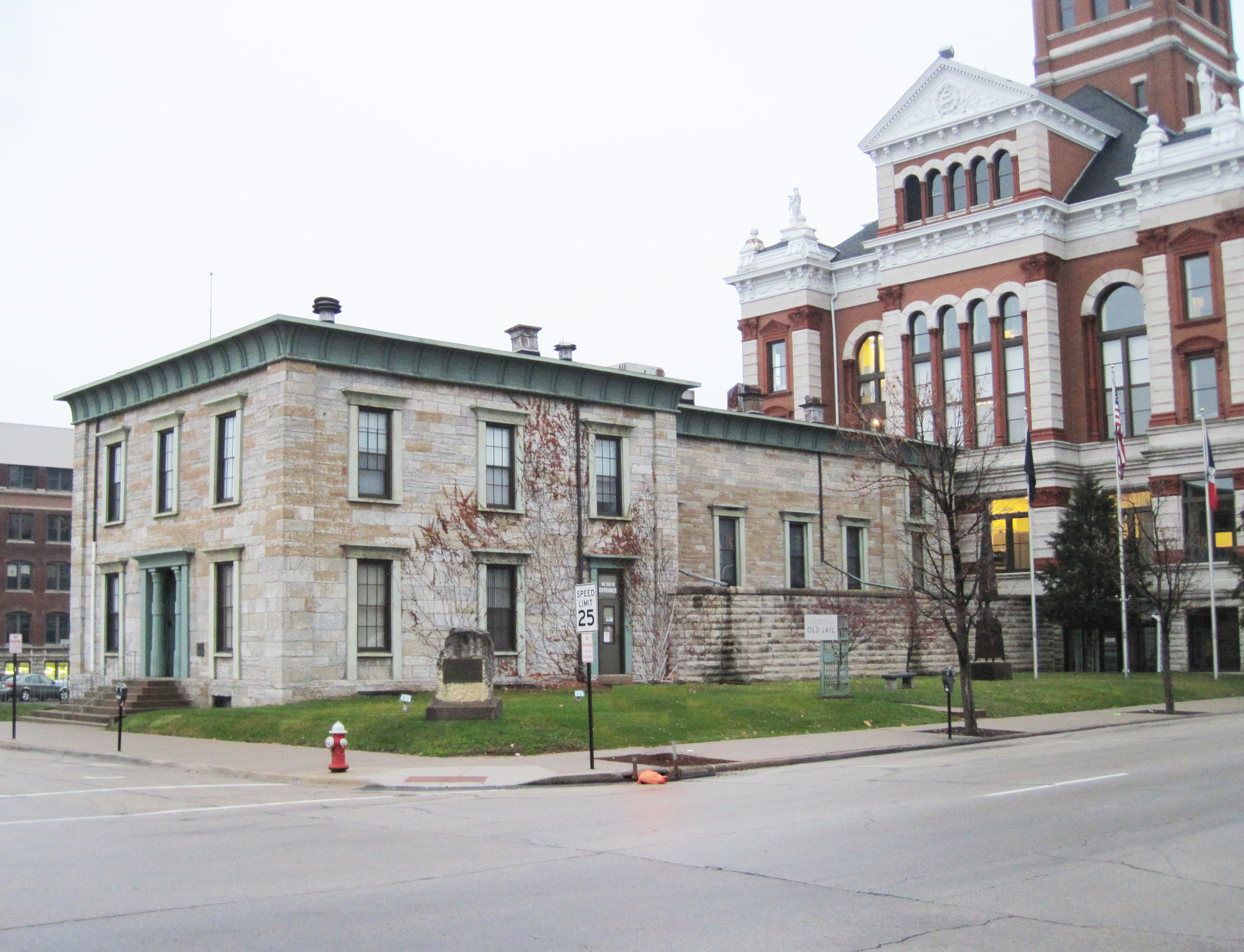
1858 Dubuque County Jail

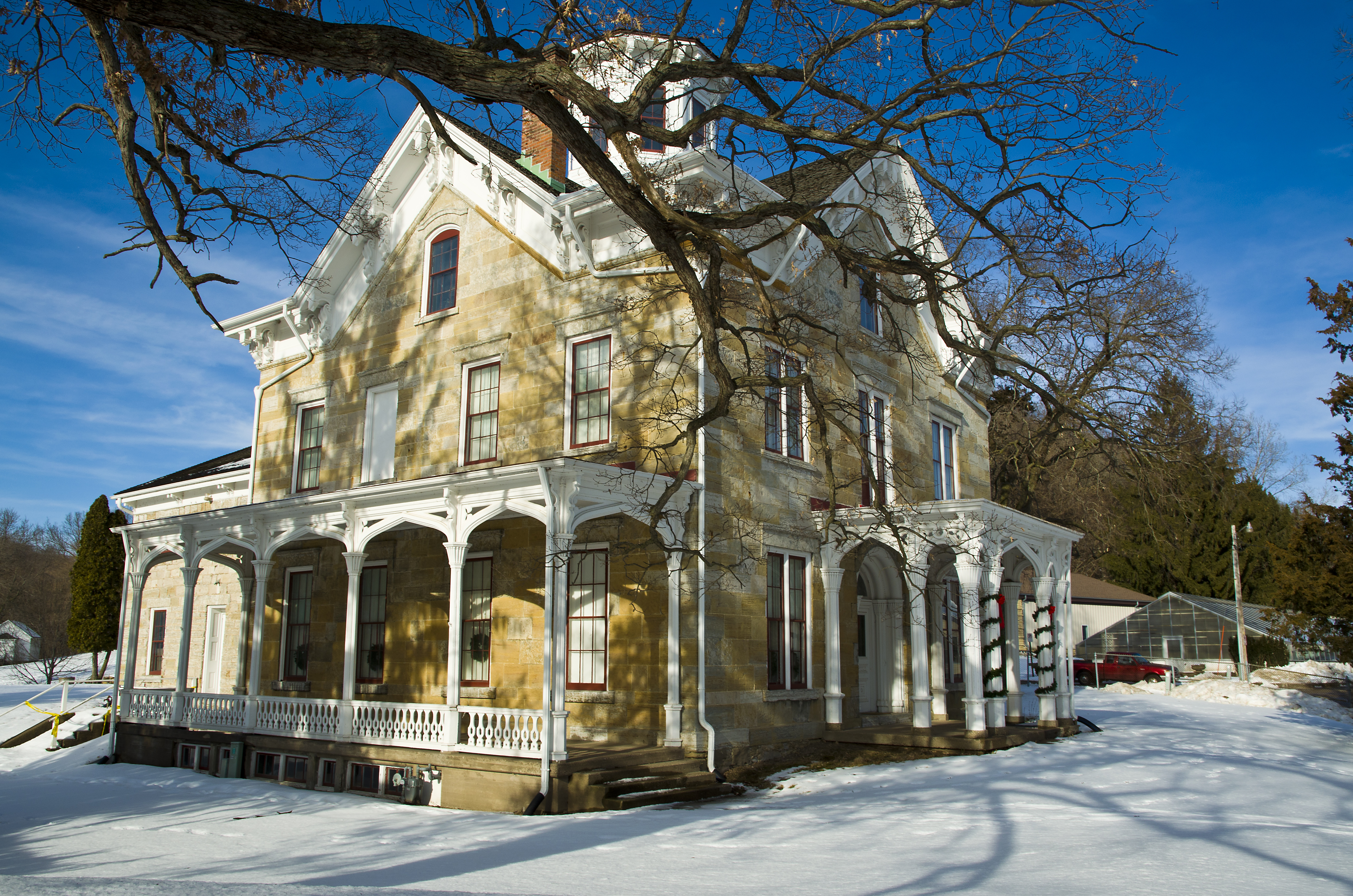
1856 Mathias Ham House

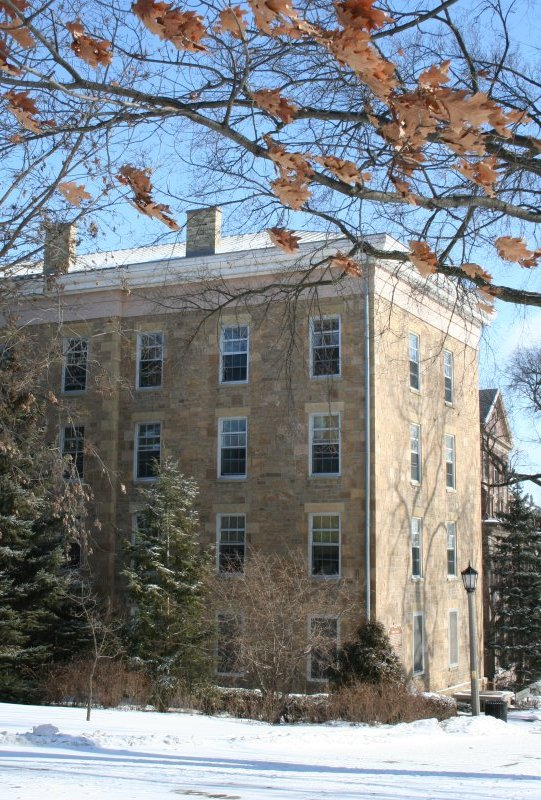
1851 North Hall, University of Wisconsin

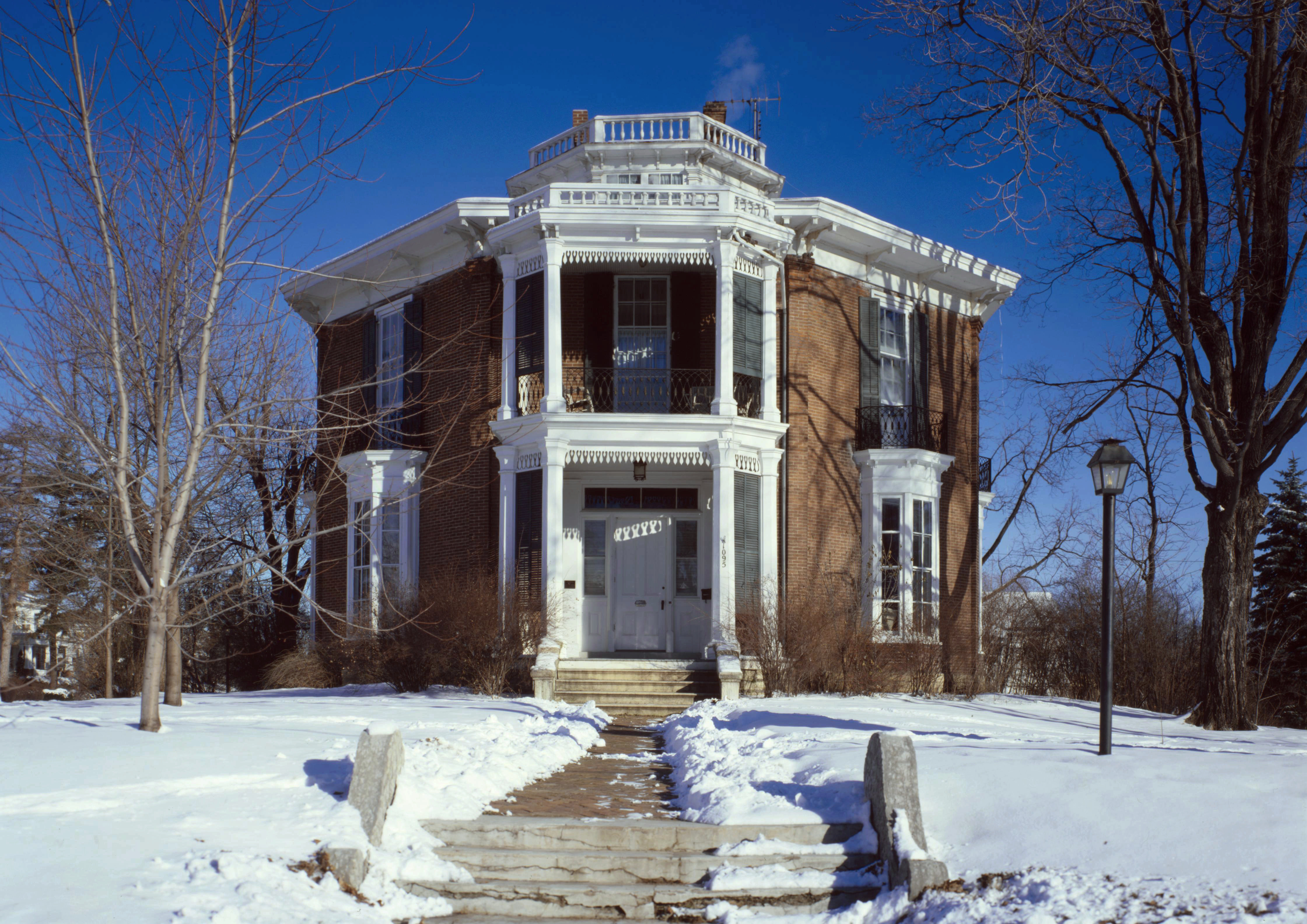
1856 Langworthy House, Dubuque
