= Frank W. Hoyt Park =

Park in Dane County, Wisconsin, United States

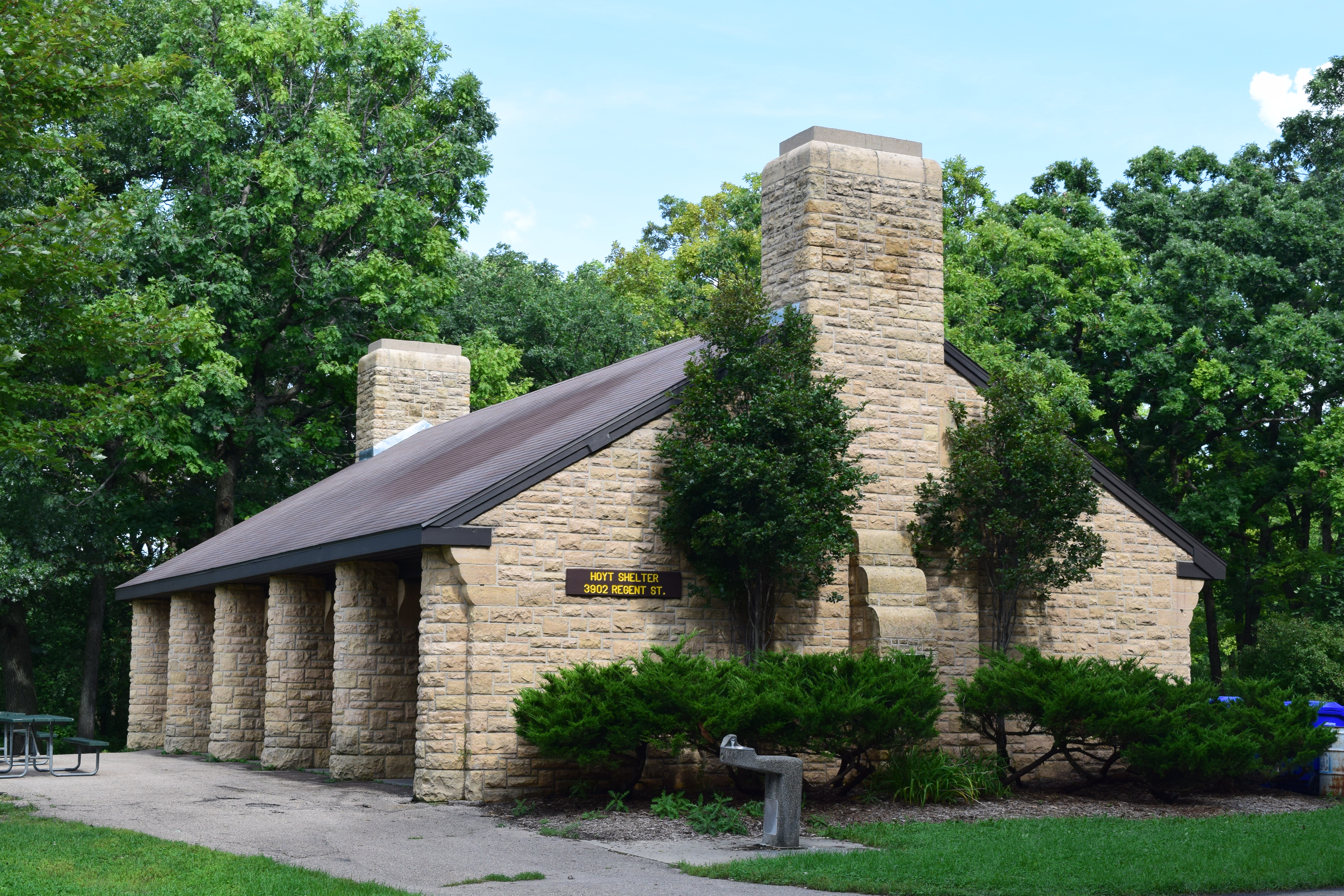
- A shelter in the park.
- Interactive map of Frank W. Hoyt Park
- Location: 3902 Regent St., 90 & 91 Owen Pkwy. Madison, Wisconsin
- Coordinates: 43.0685°N 89.4429°W
- Area: 22.63 acres (9.16 ha)
- Opened: 1936
- Frank W. Hoyt Park
- U.S. National Register of Historic Places
- U.S. Historic district
- NRHP reference No.: 100002815
- Added to NRHP: August 17, 2018

Frank W. Hoyt Park is a public park on a drumlin on the west side of Madison, Wisconsin, furnished with rustic stone structures built by public works programs during the Great Depression. In 2018 the park was added to the National Register of Historic Places.

== History ==
What is now known as Hoyt Park is made up of two sections, each developed in the 19th century. The eastern section of more than 20 acres contained two privately owned sandstone quarries starting in the 1850s: the Paunack quarry and the Larkin quarry. Near them Nathaniel Dean platted a community called Quarry Town in 1863, from which Ridge Street, Harvey, Prospect and Stevens Streets still exist. But the area was slow to develop, with only four buildings in Quarry Town by 1890. That year the City of Madison bought the Larkin quarry to supply stone for city projects.

The western section was developed by Edward T. Owen, professor of French at what is now the University of Wisconsin-Madison. Owen fell in love with the panoramic view from a "commanding height" (Sunset Point) west of the capitol. In 1892 he bought the 14-acre parcel and with help from law professor John M. Olin and farmer Edward Hammersley, obtained various easements to develop a 12-mile long rural pleasure drive. Owen paid to develop the road through his parcel (now Owen Parkway) and the drive opened in October 1892, with seventy horse carriages enjoying the opening day. Owen donated his section to the newly formed Lake Mendota Pleasure Drive Association - a private forerunner of Madison's Parks Department.

In the 1920s automobiles began to replace horses and carriages, so the Pleasure Drive Association paved Owen Parkway. Meanwhile, the city quarry was falling out of use. The last stone from it went to build Tripp and Adams Halls around 1926. In 1928 work began on clearing parts of the woods around the quarry site, aiming to make it into a park. In 1932 the Common Council voted to finalize that and name the park for Frank Hoyt, who had served as treasurer of the Pleasure Drive Association for 39 years.

By this time, the U.S. was into the Great Depression and federal work-relief programs were gearing up. In November 1933 Mayor James R. Law (also an architect) proposed building shelter houses and lavatories in the new Hoyt Park to the Civil Works Administration in Washington. In January 1934 work was underway and a writer in the Wisconsin State Journal approved:

Then there are the shelter houses at Burrows park and Frank W. Hoyt park. "Shelter houses?" you say and visualize small wooden shacks or pavilions... but the shelter houses that the CWA and the Park board are building at these two parks are SHELTER HOUSES ... shelter houses that will be remembered and talked about by every visitor to Madison who sees them.

The one at Burrows park is 47 feet long, 34 feet wide, and some 20 feet high, built of beautiful Madison sandstone, with sets of massive stone pillars across each open side and huge stone fireplaces built into each end. These fireplaces, which are not the flat-on-the-ground kind, but the same kind you have in your home, each has stone ledges where coffee pots or other cooking utensils may be set, and long iron cranes extending from the side where other cookery can be done. The one at Frank W. Hoyt park, which is just this side of Sunset Point, is exactly the same except that it is 54 feet long instead of 47. ... At Frank W. Hoyt park, besides the stone shelter house, a picnic area with outdoor ovens and fireplaces, a playfield, and graveled paths, are being constructed.

The next most amazing accomplishment the CWA and the Park board have made is what they've done to Sunset Point! Honest! You'd never recognize old Sunset Point except for the sunset and the view! The roadway there has been widened and a four-foot retaining wall built around the outside bluff so that, where two or three cars could stand before to watch the sunset, 12 or 15 can now park....

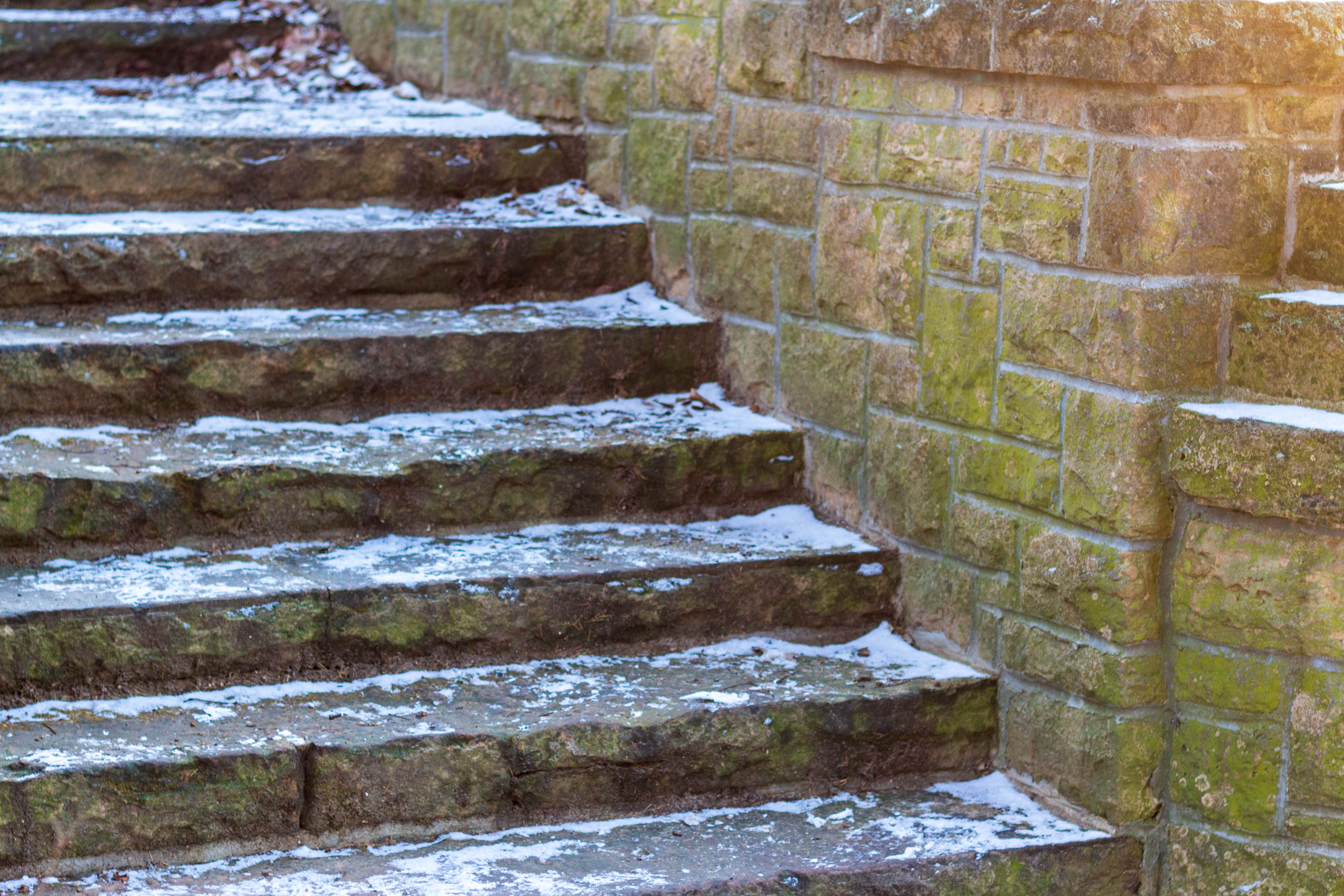

Madison Architect August L. Nerlinger had designed the Rustic-style buildings and the sandstone used in them came from the old city quarry in the park itself. Many of the stonemasons were Italian-Americans from the Greenbush neighborhood. Work finished like this:

Although CWA work ceased March 31, 40 workmen completed the masonry work and roof on the shelter house in Frank W. Hoyt park last week without pay, the city park commission was told Monday night. Lucien Schlimgen, president of the commission, will write each man a person letter of thanks.

In 1935 and 1936 grants from the Works Progress Administration, another New Deal make-work program, funded more road construction and building of bathrooms in the park, and the sandstone pedestrian gateway designed by local architect Ferdinand Kronenberg. In 1941 Mr. and Mrs. Frank Hoyt donated an additional 5 acres to the park.

This account from the Wisconsin State Journal in 1937 gives a picture of how the park was seen when largely complete:

Most popular of all picnicking spots is Hoyt park, which offers 14 outdoor fireplaces, built of masonry and equipped with grates. Here, as at most other parks where fireplaces are provided, fuel wood is available from the attendant at 10 cents a bundle. And here, also at Hoyt park, is the one "nature trail," a cool shady course for an invigorating stroll made interesting by natural woods, trim shrubs and occasional views of the countryside and the lakes. The complete circuit of the trail, from the park up to the summit of Sunset point and back past the shelter house, is about 1 3/4 miles.
