= United States Post Office and Courthouse (Dubuque, Iowa) =

- U.S. Post Office and Courthouse
- U.S. Historic district – Contributing property
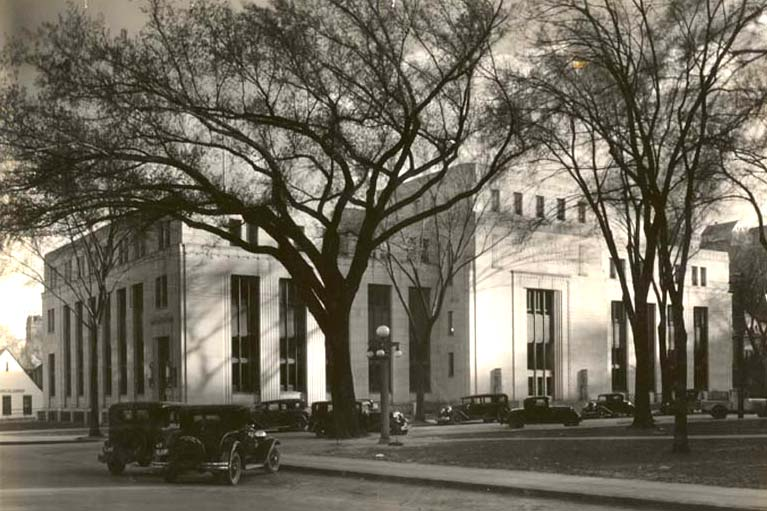
- United States Post Office and Courthouse as it appeared in 1934

- Location within Iowa Location within the United States
- Interactive map showing the location of U.S. Post Office and Courthouse, Dubuque
- Location: 350 West 6th Street, Dubuque, Iowa United States
- Coordinates: 42°29′48″N 90°40′3″W
- Built: 1932-34
- Architect: Office of the Supervising Architect under James A. Wetmore
- Architectural style: Art Deco
- Part of: Cathedral Historic District (ID85002501)
- Added to NRHP: September 25, 1985

The United States Post Office and Courthouse, Dubuque, Iowa is a courthouse of the United States District Court for the Northern District of Iowa located in Dubuque, Iowa. Completed in 1934, it was listed in the National Register of Historic Places in 1985. It is a contributing resource within the Cathedral Historic District.

== Building history ==
As Dubuque expanded during the 1920s, the post office was not large enough to handle the increasing volume of mail. Rather than enlarge the existing building, city officials decided to construct a new post office. Congressman Thomas J. B. Robinson led the effort to secure a more appropriate postal facility. Officials determined that the new building would function as both a post office and courthouse, and the building continues to serve these purposes today.

The building was constructed with funding from the 1926 Public Buildings Act, in which Congress appropriated substantial resources for Federal buildings throughout the United States. Dubuque received approximately $650,000 for site acquisition and construction costs. Renowned city planner John Nolen intended for the building to be part of his civic design, "Administrative Center at Washington Park," which he developed in 1931. City officials hoped to construct a city hall, courthouse, and park adjacent to the post office, but these plans were never realized.

The Courthouse was designed by the Office of the Supervising Architect under James A. Wetmore, who received input from Iowa architects. Among the local designers was the office of Proudfoot, Rawson, Souers & Thomas, a Des Moines firm. This firm (including earlier variations of the founding office) had a long of history of designing high-profile public buildings in Iowa, including the Polk County Courthouse in Des Moines and buildings for Iowa State University and the University of Iowa. Although little is known about the Dubuque architect involved in the project, Herbert Kennison, he likely served as an onsite consultant and provided the valued contribution of a designer who was also a local resident.

The building's cornerstone was laid in 1932, and a dedication ceremony was held the following year. The building was occupied in early 1934. In 1985, it was listed in the National Register of Historic Places as a contributing resource within the Cathedral Historic District, which encompasses historically significant residences and public buildings.

== Architecture ==
The United States Post Office and Courthouse is located in the heart of the business district in downtown Dubuque, Iowa, and fronts Washington Park. Construction commenced in 1932 and was completed in 1934. The building, which was designed in the Art Deco style, displays the strong rectilinear qualities that influenced Modern architecture in the 1940s, 50s, and 60s. The building has a form that is similar to public architecture of earlier periods, but most of the elaborate ornamentation found on buildings from previous eras was omitted. The result is clean and restrained, yet still monumental. Many civic buildings constructed during the Great Depression display this reserved quality.

The building consists of a centrally placed, projecting, four-story tower flanked by three-story wings. The tower was originally designed to accommodate an observation room for the local weather bureau. The exterior is clad in cream-colored Bedford limestone cut into ashlar (squared and smooth) blocks. Decorative details that are consistent with typical Art Deco ornamentation are found on the building. These include stylized flowers, swags, dentils (rectangular blocks), and chevron (V-shaped) elements. The corners of the tower are chamfered with a 45-degree bevel cut and contain stylized eagle motifs that express the Federal government's presence in Dubuque. The tall, vertical windows are evenly spaced and have bronze mullions, which are common on Art Deco architecture. The windows are separated by fluted pilasters (attached columns) that add to the classical appeal of the building's design.

The interior features several important murals in the lobby vestibule. The murals were funded with $2,000 of the original money allotted for construction of the building. Although a competition to select an artist was held, officials intended to select Grant Wood, the famous Iowa painter of "American Gothic," to complete the murals. When Wood did not enter the competition, William E. L. Bunn was selected. The selection was subsequently overturned in favor of a painter named Bertrand Adams. As a compromise, both Bunn and Adams, who each studied and worked with Wood and were friends from the University of Iowa, were allowed to paint murals. Adams painted "Early Settlers of Dubuque" in 1936 and 1937. The painting depicts several symbols of the city's pioneering days, such as the Julien Dubuque Monument and the Meskwaki Native American village. Adams also represented impending industrialization by painting the Dubuque Shot Tower and a bridge. Bunn painted "Early Mississippi Packet 'Dubuque III'" (also referred to as "Early Mississippi Steamboats") at the same time. His mural illustrates life in Dubuque in 1870, when steamboats were a primary method of transportation in the Midwest. The two murals show a harmony of scale and color use.

The lobby is also decorated with American walnut veneer panels topped by an ornamental cornice with designs of leaves and circles. Bronze grilles with geometric patterns are a typical Art Deco feature. The main staircase on the north end of the building is richly finished with rose-gray marble wainscot, stairs, and landings. The brushed aluminum railing adds a strong Art Deco character to the space.

The courtroom is located on the second floor. Cardiff green marble encircles the base of the room. American walnut paneling is laid in a herringbone pattern and topped with a scalloped band of wood. The scalloped motif is repeated in metal grilles and furniture. The most elaborate feature of the room is the plaster cornice with carved dentils, leaves, floral designs, and chevrons highlighted with metallic paint.

== Significant events ==
- 1932-1934: United States Post Office and Courthouse constructed
- 1933: Cornerstone dedication ceremony
- 1935: Competition held to select artists for murals
- 1937: Murals by Bertrand Adams and William Bunn completed
- 1985: United States Post Office and Courthouse listed in the National Register of Historic Places as a contributing resource within the Cathedral Historic District
