= David Woodhouse =

American architect

David Woodhouse is an American architect born in Peoria, Illinois. He is the founder of David Woodhouse Architects, now Woodhouse Tinucci Architects.

== Biography and influences ==
Woodhouse received his Bachelor of Architecture from the University of Illinois at Urbana in 1971 in a program that included study at the École des Beaux-Arts in Versailles, France. He then joined Stanley Tigerman and Associates in Chicago, where he became an associate before leaving in 1978 to join Booth/Hansen and Associates, where he was senior associate and vice president. In 1987 he started a partnership which became David Woodhouse Architects in 1990. He gained membership in the College of Fellows of the American Institute of Architects in 1999. In 2014, after a 13-year collaboration with Andy Tinucci changed the David Woodhouse Architects LLC (DWA) firm name to Woodhouse Tinucci Architects.

== Awards ==
His projects have won preservation citations from the Richard H Driehaus Foundation, Landmarks Illinois, and the Lake Forest Preservation Foundation. They have been published both here and abroad in architectural periodicals and books such as Architectural Record, the Chicago Tribune and the AIA Guide to Chicago.

== Projects ==
- Daniel Burnham Memorial Competition (Chicago)
- University of Chicago Booth School of Business Gleacher Center Annex
- University of Chicago Bond Chapel
- Northwestern University Sailing Center
- the Lake Forest LibraryChildren's Theater
- Buckingham Fountain Visitor Pavilions
- Venues for Chicago's Bid for the 2016 Olympics
- the Rainbow Park Beach Houses and Field House
- the Divine Word Chapel in Techny, Illinois
- Lake County Museum in Wauconda, Illinois
- the buildings at Independence Grove Forest Preserve in Libertyville
- the East and West Gates at Lincoln Park Zoo
- the Davis Square Park Pool House and Field House renovation
- the Morton Arboretum Visitor Center
- Lincoln Park Conservatory Master Plan
- DuSable Harbor Building on Chicago’s lakefront
- the Cove School in Northbrook, Illinois
- the Main Library renovation at Northwestern University
- the Alice Kaplan Institute for the Humanities at Northwestern University
- the Daley Library Information Commons at the University of Illinois at Chicago

== Exhibitions and publications ==
Woodhouse's proposal for Chicago's Education District is featured in the book Visionary Chicago Architecture, edited by Stanley Tigerman in 2004.

== Juries and teaching ==
Woodhouse has served on architectural design award juries for the American Institute of Architects and preservation foundations, has contributed articles to several architectural periodicals and has been a faculty member at Archeworks.

He has taught as an adjunct professor at the Illinois Institute of Technology's College of Architecture and is a frequent lecturer and visiting design critic at the University of Illinois in Chicago, the Illinois Institute of Technology and the School of the Art Institute of Chicago.
