= Eagle Point Park (Dubuque, Iowa) =

Park in Dubuque, Iowa, United States

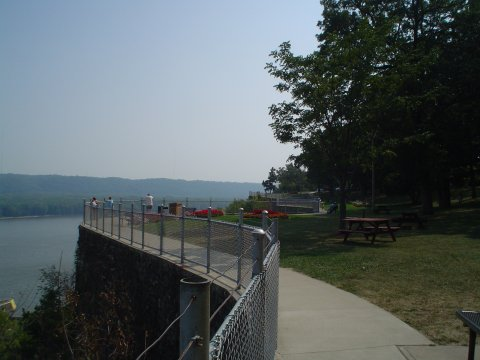
- View of the Mississippi River from Eagle Point Park
- Interactive map of Eagle Point Park
- Type: Public park
- Location: Dubuque, Iowa
- Area: 164 acres (0.66 km^{2})
- Created: May 1909
- Operator: City of Dubuque
- Open: May to October
- Eagle Point Park Historic District
- U.S. National Register of Historic Places
- U.S. Historic district
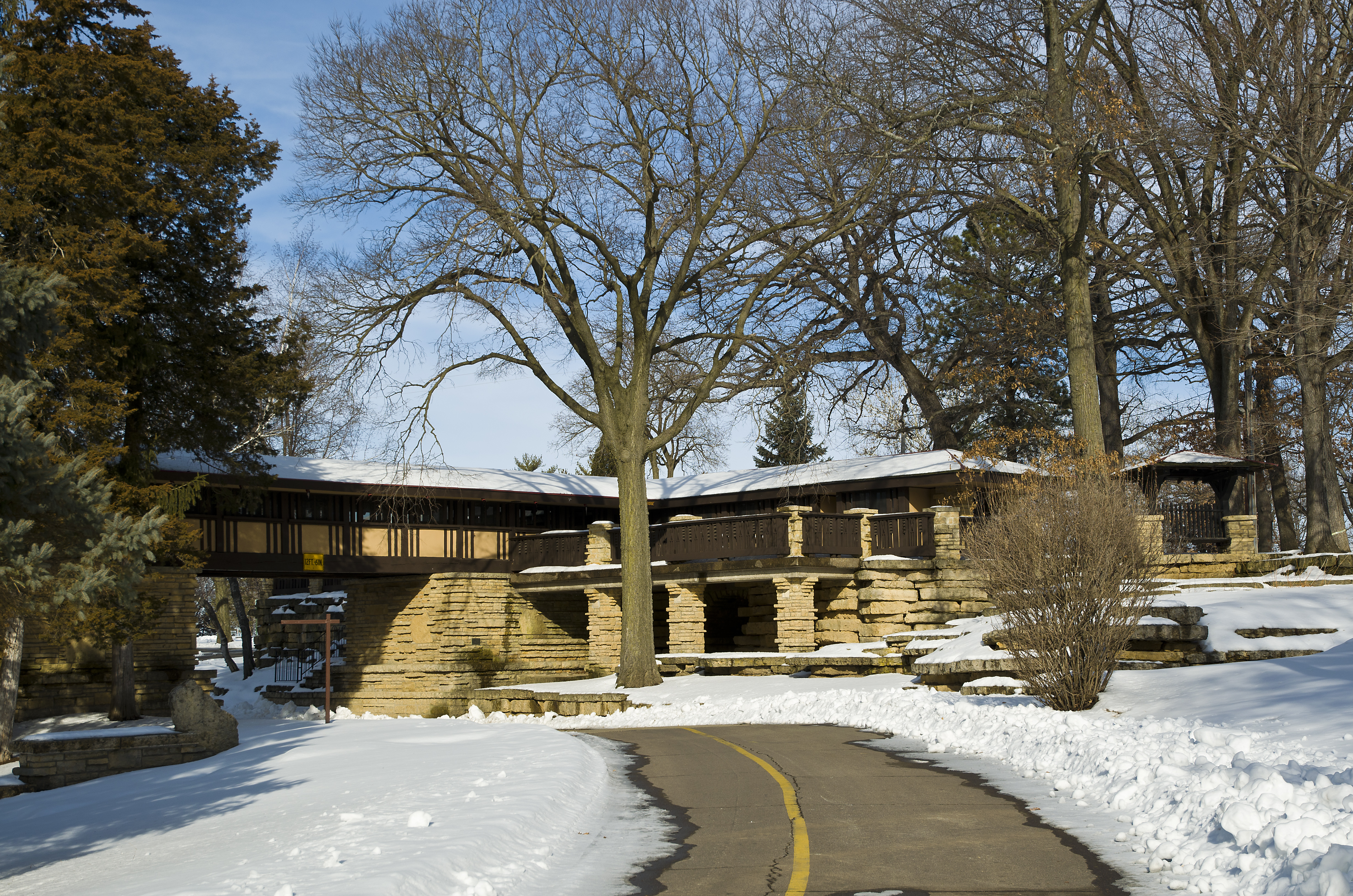
- Bridge Complex (1935)

- Location within Iowa Location within the United States
- Coordinates: 42°32′26″N 90°39′03″W
- Architect: Charles Mulford Robinson; Charles Nassau Lowrie; Alfred Caldwell, et al.
- Architectural style: Prairie School
- NRHP reference No.: 100001834
- Added to NRHP: November 27, 2017

Eagle Point Park is a 164-acre (0.66 km^{2}) public park located in the northeast corner of the city of Dubuque, Iowa, United States. Eagle Point is mostly situated on a bluff that overlooks the Mississippi River and the Lock and Dam No. 11. The park is owned and operated by the city of Dubuque. It was listed as a historic district on the National Register of Historic Places in 2017. At the time of its nomination it contained 34 resources, which included 14 contributing buildings, seven contributing sites, five structures, five objects, two non-contributing buildings, and two non-contributing structures.

== History ==
The Eagle Point site was selected by Charles Mulford Robinson, who wrote a report, "Report on the Improvement of the City of Dubuque, Iowa". A committee, led by Judge Oliver Perry Shiras, was formed and the property was acquired by the city in 1908. The park was opened in 1909. During the Great Depression, as part of the Works Progress Administration program the park was expanded and renovated. President Franklin D. Roosevelt viewed the park and said, "This is my idea of a worthwhile boondoggle". Architect Alfred Caldwell directed the building of many of the structures at the park, which made use of the limestone found in the area. These include the pavilions, the fish pond, the areas around the fish pond, and a bandshell for public concerts. A large statue of an eagle was placed near the entrance to the park. At one time the city offered regular bus service to and from the park, and a shelter was built for bus passengers. Today, that shelter is used as an information center.

The Riverwalk, situated along the edge of the bluff, has views of the Mississippi, the Lock and Dam, the city of Dubuque, and Grant County, Wisconsin. The park offers tennis courts, horseshoe pits, playground equipment, a band shell with free music concerts, and a small wading pool for young children. The park charges a one dollar admission fee for automobiles, and a five dollar fee for buses to enter the park. There is no fee for pedestrians. The park's season runs from May 1 to October 31. During the off season the park is closed to vehicle traffic, but people can park near Eagle Point's rear entrance and walk into the park.

Below the park was the site of the Eagle Point Bridge, which was torn down in the 1980s.

== See also ==
- Parks in Dubuque, Iowa
