= J.H. Thedinga House =

Historic house in Iowa, United States

- U.S. National Register of Historic Places
- U.S. Historic district – Contributing property
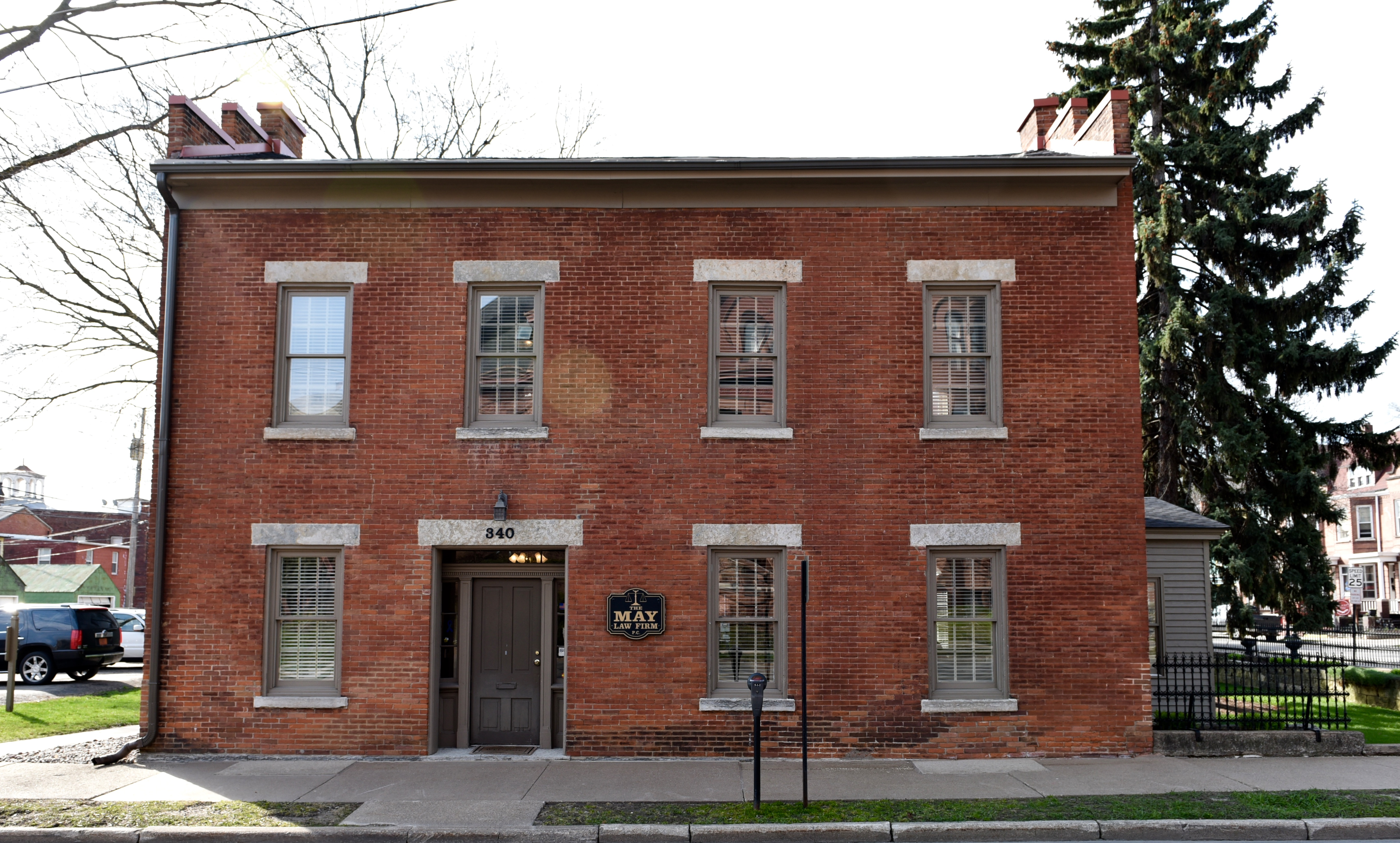

- Location within Iowa Location within the United States
- Location: 340 W. 5th St. Dubuque, Iowa
- Coordinates: 42°29′51.8″N 90°40′3.7″W
- Area: less than one acre
- Built: 1855
- Part of: Cathedral Historic District (ID85002501)
- NRHP reference No.: 76000768
- Added to NRHP: November 7, 1976

The J.H. Thedinga House is a historic building located in Dubuque, Iowa, United States. Thedinga was a native of Hanover who settled in Dubuque in 1839. He studied law, but never practiced it. He was an early settler here and was engaged in retail. Thedinga also held a variety of political positions, including mayor. The two-story brick structure features crow-stepped gables on the sides. It was built as an addition to a frame house in 1855. The frame structure was removed some time between 1885 and 1900. The brick structure was altered at that time so that the library was converted into a kitchen and dining room, the parlor was divided into two sections, and the lower and upper porches were added to the south side. The house was individually listed on the National Register of Historic Places in 1976, and it was included as a contributing property in the Cathedral Historic District in 1985.
