= Eli Bates Fountain =

Fountain and sculpture in Chicago, Illinois, U.S.

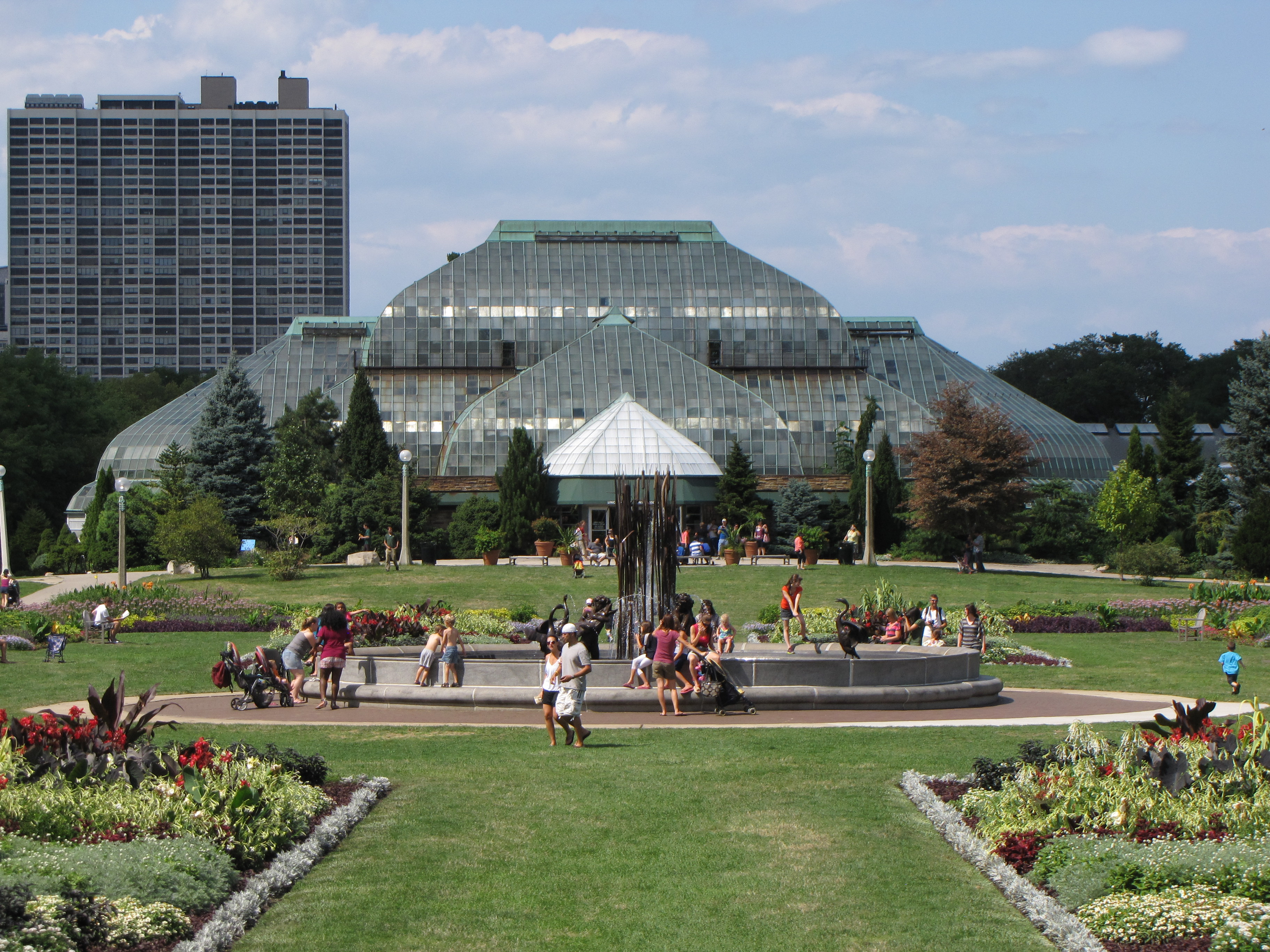
- The fountain in 2012
- Location: Chicago, Illinois, U.S.
- 41°55′22″N 87°38′7″W

Eli Bates Fountain, also known as Storks at Play, is a fountain and sculpture in the center of the formal garden outside Lincoln Park's Conservatory, in Chicago, Illinois, United States.

== Description ==
The fountain is composed of a large, circular granite basin, two bronze storks (or, possibly, herons) with outstretched wings and water spewing water from their beaks, three figures that are half-boy and half-fish each holding unwieldy fishes, and bronze reeds and cattails at the center.

== History ==
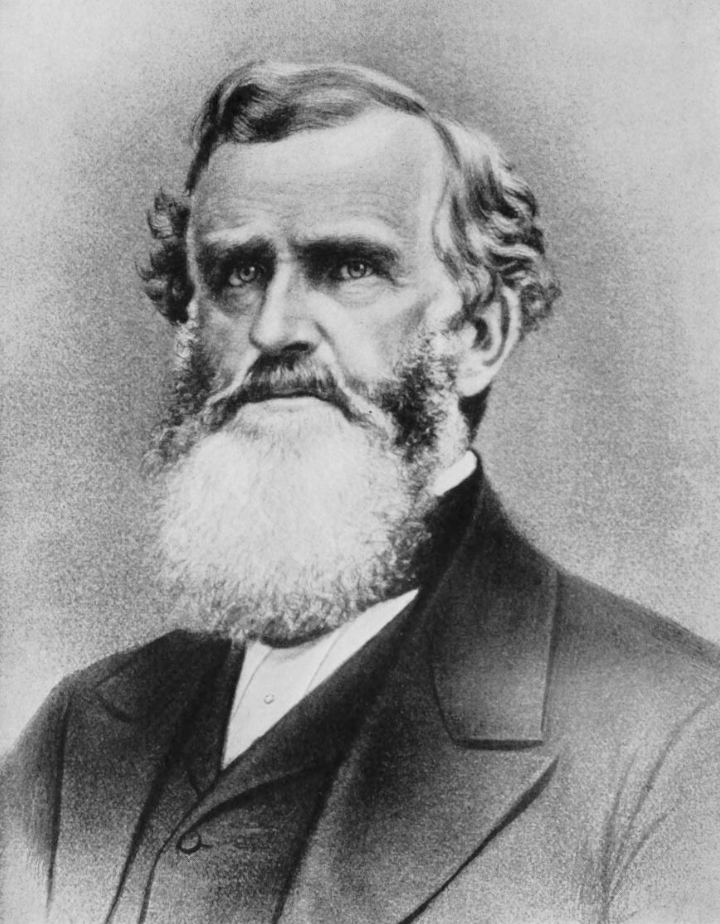
Eli Bates

The fountain was installed in 1887 as a gift from Eli Bates, a wealthy Chicago business man. It was designed by famous artist Augustus Saint-Gaudens (1848–1907), and his assistant Frederick William MacMonnies (1863–1937), who later would design the famous central fountain, the Grand Barge of State, in the 1893 World's Columbian Exposition.
