= Alfred Caldwell =

American architect (1903–1998)

- Born: May 26, 1903; St. Louis, Missouri, U.S.
- Died: July 3, 1998 (aged 95); Bristol, Kenosha County, Wisconsin
- Occupation: Architect
- Projects: Lily Pool, Chicago, Illinois; Eagle Point Park, Dubuque, Iowa

Alfred Caldwell (May 26, 1903 – July 3, 1998) was an American architect best known for his landscape architecture in and around Chicago, Illinois.

== Early life and education ==
Caldwell attended the University of Illinois at Urbana-Champaign but left before completing a degree. Caldwell received a Master of Science in city planning from the Illinois Institute of Technology in 1948.

== Career ==
From 1926 to 1931 he worked for landscape architect Jens Jensen and had a two-year private practice thereafter. In 1933 he was appointed Superintendent of Parks for Dubuque, Iowa, where he created Eagle Point Park. From 1936 to 1939 he was a landscape designer for the Chicago Park District and was the designer and architect of the Alfred Caldwell Lily Pool at Lincoln Park. He was hired by Mies van der Rohe in 1944 to teach landscape architecture at the Illinois Institute of Technology (IIT) College of Architecture. Caldwell resigned in 1959 in response to a dispute with the college administration. In 1965 he taught at Virginia Polytechnic Institute and the following year he began teaching at the University of Southern California and stayed till 1973. In 1981 he returned to teach at IIT.

== Honors ==
In 1980, Caldwell received the Distinguished Educator Award from the Chicago chapter of the AIA. In 1985, he was honored as an ACSA Distinguished Professor. The Illinois Institute of Technology named him a Doctor of Humane Letters in 1988.

== Personal life ==
Caldwell and his wife Virginia had a daughter, Carol Caldwell Dooley, born on January 25, 1931, and a son, James Allen Caldwell, born on December 12, 1933.

== Major works ==
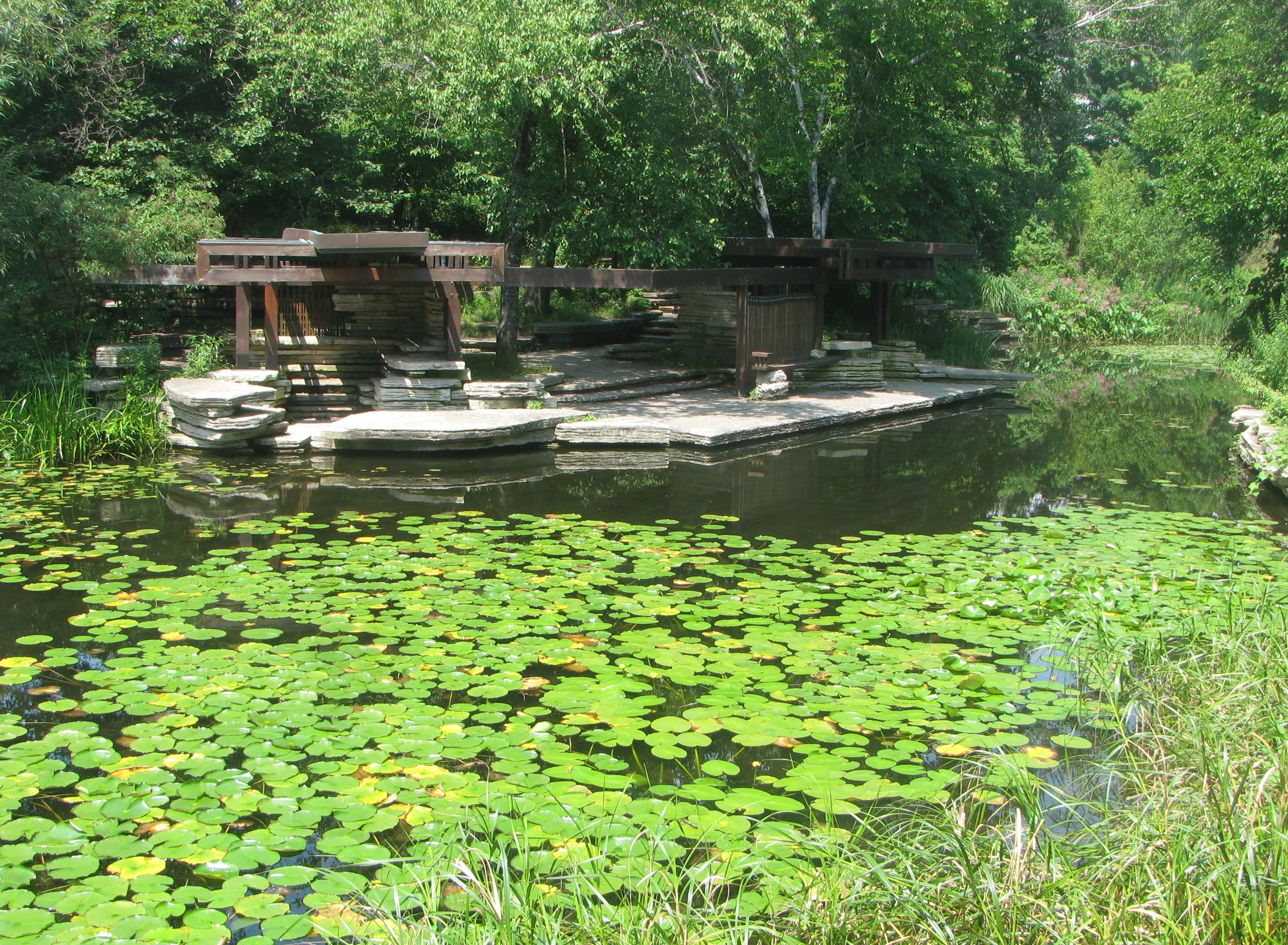
Alfred Caldwell Lily Pool is a National Historic Landmark listing rehabilitated and maintained by the Chicago Park District and Lincoln Park Conservancy.

- Eagle Point Park, Dubuque, Iowa.
- Promontory Point in Burnham Park, Chicago, Illinois.
- Riis Park, Chicago.
- Alfred Caldwell Lily Pool at Lincoln Park, Chicago. Rehabilitated from 1998 to 2002 by the Lincoln Park Conservancy and Chicago Park District and designated as a Chicago Landmark and a National Historic Landmark.
- Campus Landscaping, Illinois Institute of Technology, Chicago. Major portions have been destroyed.
- Lafayette Park, Detroit, together with his IIT colleagues Ludwig Mies van der Rohe and Ludwig Hilberseimer.

Caldwell, like his mentor Jens Jensen, promoted a natural style of landscape design. The intent was to manufacture a native landscape that copied natural ecosystems. A complete natural ecosystem requires little maintenance other than removal of non-native invasive species. Due to the subtleness of his planting designs and the live nature of landscape materials, many of Caldwell's projects have fallen into disrepair as the result of improper maintenance and modifications. The Lily Pool suffered the same neglect and misuse for many years, but was rehabilitated between 1998 and 2002 pursuant to a plan prepared by Wolff Landscape Architecture. It is now regularly maintained by the Lincoln Park Conservancy and the Chicago Park District.

Caldwell's buildings are frequently mistaken for the work of Frank Lloyd Wright. Both architects created Prairie School designs in and around Chicago at roughly the same period of time. Caldwell stressed the importance of orientation for passive solar design, as well as integration of the structure into the landscape.

== Caldwell’s own house ==
In the 1940s, Caldwell began construction of his own house near Bristol, Wisconsin, along with planting nearly 30 acres (120,000 m^{2}) of eastern hardwood forest. It was intended to be a working hobby farm. An apple orchard was planted, but farm buildings were never completed. As work progressed the house featured a low cost construction materials technique: stone for the stone walls was donated by neighboring farmers, labor was provided by students as they learned how to build a stone wall.

== Death ==
Alfred Caldwell died at the age of 95 at his Bristol, Wisconsin, farm on July 3, 1998.
