= Redstone (Dubuque, Iowa) =

Historic house in Iowa, United States

- U.S. National Register of Historic Places
- U.S. Historic district – Contributing property
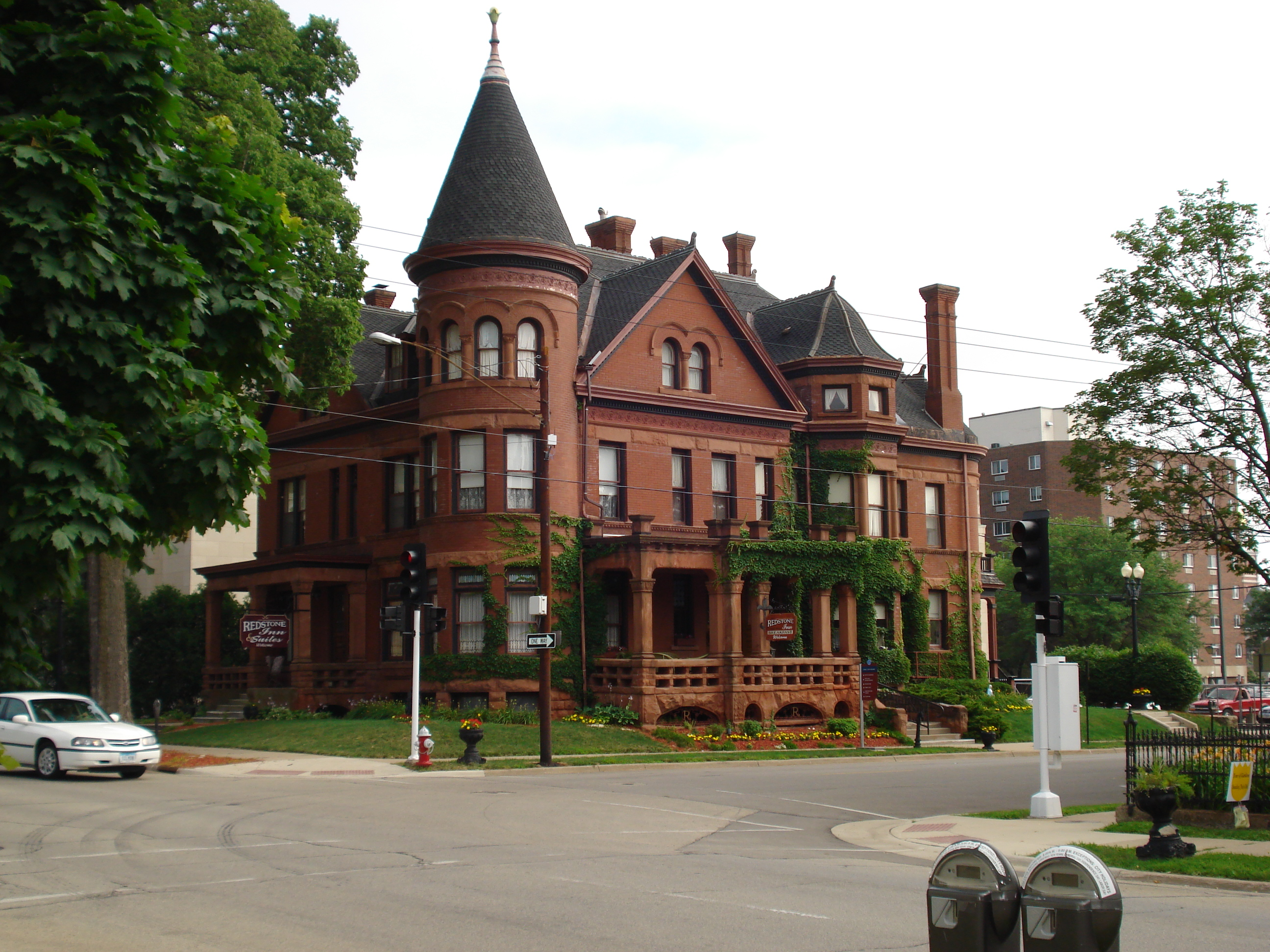

- Location within Iowa Location within the United States
- Location: 504 Bluff St. Dubuque, Iowa
- Coordinates: 42°29′52.8″N 90°40′04.3″W
- Area: less than one acre
- Built: 1888
- Architect: Thomas Carkeek
- Architectural style: Romanesque Revival
- Part of: Cathedral Historic District (ID85002501)
- NRHP reference No.: 76000766
- Added to NRHP: December 12, 1976

Redstone is a historic building located in Dubuque, Iowa, United States. This is one of three large homes that Augustine A. Cooper, who owned Cooper Wagon and Buggy Works, built for himself and his two daughters. When it was completed in 1888 it was a duplex with 27 rooms, with the family side more ornate than the tenant side. The 2½-story brick structure with red sandstone trim was designed by Thomas Carkeek in the Richardsonian Romanesque style. The elements of that style are found in the round arch window openings, the use of rough limestone for the lintels, and its heavy mass. The terracotta friezework on the cornices over the bay window, the tower, the corner gables, and the Corinthian-style capitals on the porch columns reflect Neoclassical influences. The house was individually listed on the National Register of Historic Places in 1976, and it was included as a contributing property in the Cathedral Historic District in 1985. The building has been converted into a bed and breakfast inn.
