= Fenelon Place Residential Historic District =

Historic district in Iowa, United States

- U.S. National Register of Historic Places
- U.S. Historic district
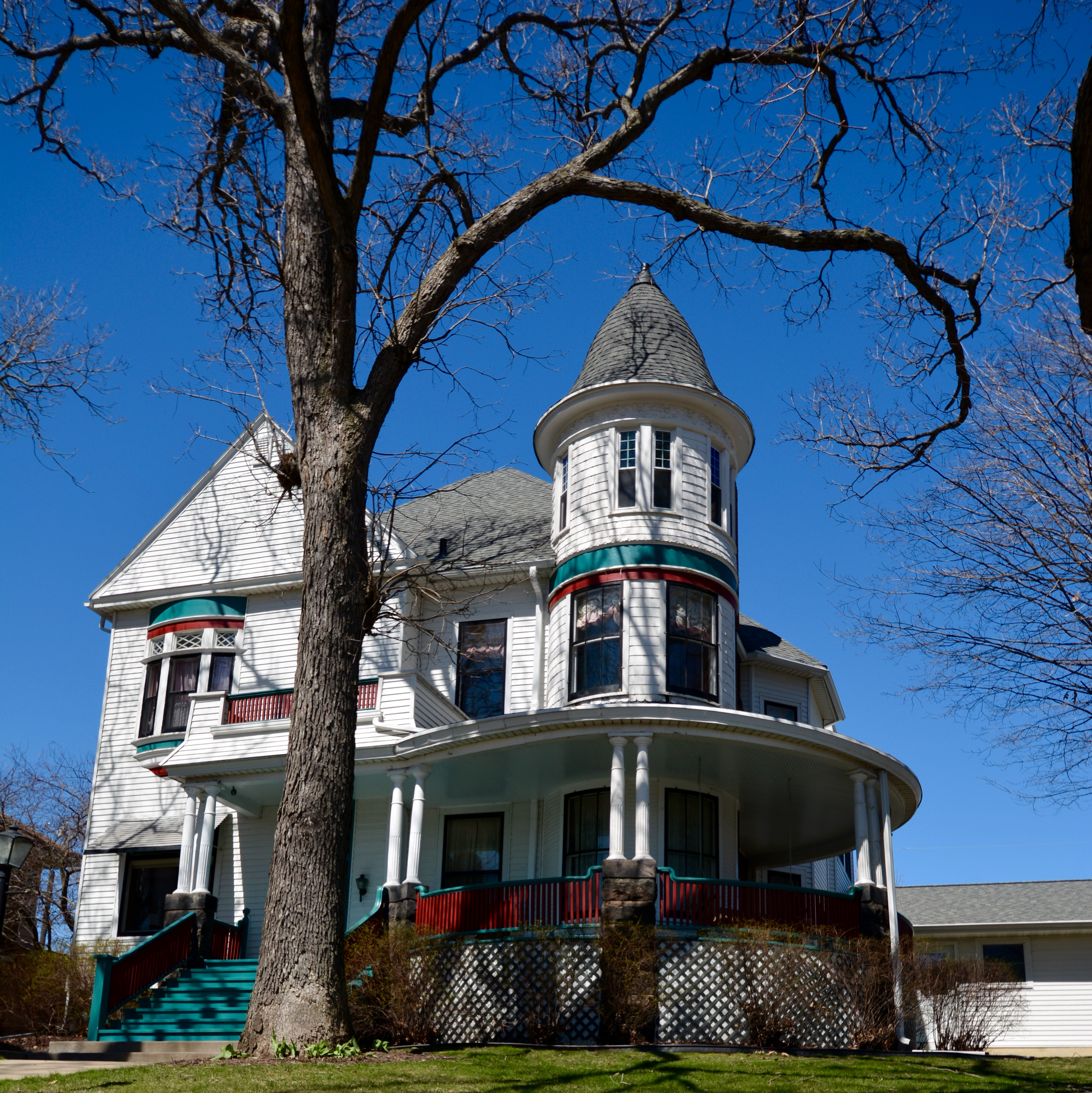
- 565 Fenlon Place (1898)

- Location within Iowa Location within the United States
- Location: Hill St., W. 3 & 5th Sts., Fenelon Pl., Fenelon Place Elevator, Dubuque, Iowa
- Coordinates: 42°29′46.3″N 90°40′10.9″W
- Area: 39.67 acres (16.05 ha)
- MPS: Dubuque, Iowa MPS
- NRHP reference No.: 15000787
- Added to NRHP: November 16, 2015

The Fenelon Place Residential Historic District is a nationally recognized historic district located in Dubuque, Iowa, United States. It was listed on the National Register of Historic Places in 2015. At the time of its nomination it consisted of 218 resources, which included 171 contributing buildings, two contributing structures, one contributing site, 43 non-contributing buildings, and one non-contributing structure. The residential area that makes up the district is located on a plateau located directly above the Mississippi River Valley. This was the first bluff-top neighborhood in Dubuque that established elevator service. The first Fenelon Place Elevator, listed on the National Register in 1978, was completed in 1894. Early houses on the plateau were small cottages built by lead miners. They were replaced by large houses that were built in two periods. The first period at the end of the 19th century saw houses built in the Italianate, Gothic Revival, Second Empire, and Queen Anne styles. House in the second period in the beginning of the 20th century were largely built in the Classical Revival and Tudor Revival styles.
