= Parks in Dubuque, Iowa =

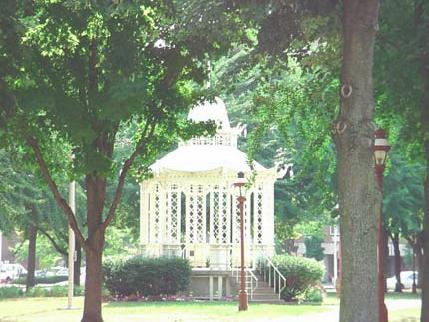
The Washington Park Gazebo in Downtown Dubuque.

The Mississippi River, as seen from Eagle Point Park.

The City of Dubuque, Iowa maintains an extensive park system. Because of Dubuque's varied topography, several of the parks feature panoramic views of the city, including: Cleveland Park, Eagle Point Park, Madison Park, and Murphy Park. The city currently operates 39 parks, 6 trails, 2 swimming pools, a golf course, arboretum, campground, and 3 other properties. In total, more than 1,060 acres (4.3 km^{2}) of parks and recreation facilities are city-owned and available for public use.

In recent years, the city's park system has been greatly expanded. Many new neighborhood "mini" parks and playgrounds have been built, and all of the existing parks have been renovated since the mid-1990s. Currently, 8 parks are in some phase of development. The city is also working on an interconnected hike/bike trail system that will, at first, link up various riverfront attractions, such as those in the Port of Dubuque. Eventually, the system will be expanded into the outlying neighborhoods, including a trail in the Catfish Creek Valley.

== Parks ==
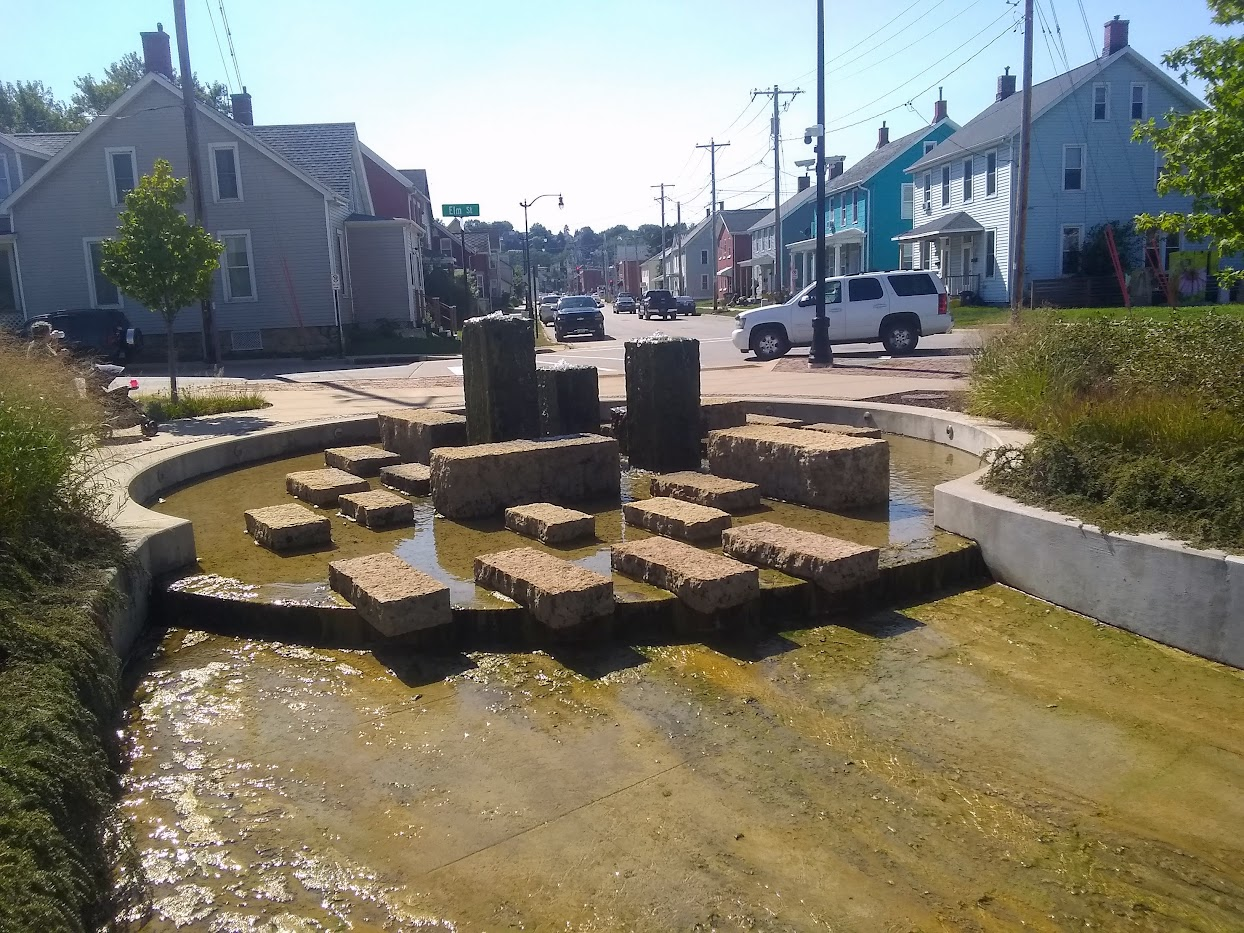
Fountains along the Bee Branch Greenway

=== List of parks ===
- Allison-Henderson Park
- Avon Park
- A.Y. McDonald Park
- Bergfeld Recreation Area
- Bee Branch Greenway
- Burden Park
- Cancer Survivor Park
- Cleveland Park
- Comiskey Park
- Dog Park
- Eagle Point Park
- Falk Park
- Flat Iron Park
- Flora Park
- Gay Park
- Grant Park
- Harvest View Park
- Hillcrest Park
- Hilltop Park
- Jackson Park
- Jefferson Park
- Madison Park
- Marna Ridge Children's Forest
- Marshall Park/Dubuque Arboretum & Botanical Gardens
- Maus Park
- McAleece Sports Complex
- Medical Associates Greenbelt
- Miller-Riverview Park
- Murphy Park
- Orange Park
- Pinard Park
- Pyatigorsk Park
- Rocco Buda Jr. Park
- Roosevelt Park
- Southern Park
- Teddy Bear Park
- Valentine Park
- Valley High Park
- Veterans' Memorial Park
- Waller-Cooper Park
- Washington Park

=== Parks being developed ===
- Eagle Valley Park
- Elmwood Green Park
- Port of Dubuque Park
- Riley Park
- Southern Park
- Usha Park
- Welu Park
- Westbrook Park

== Recreation ==
=== Trails ===
- Bee Branch Trails
- Dubuque Jaycees Trail
- Granger Creek Nature Trail
- Heritage Trail
- Mississippi Riverwalk
- NW Arterial Trail
- Southern Levee Trail

=== Other facilities ===
- Bunker Hill Golf Course
- E.B. Lyons Prairie & Woodland Preserve
- Flora Park Swimming Pool
- Four Mounds Estate
- Nicholas J. Sutton Swimming Pool
- Oakwood Park

== See also ==
- Urban park
