= Fenelon Place Elevator =

Funicular railway in Dubuque, Iowa, USA

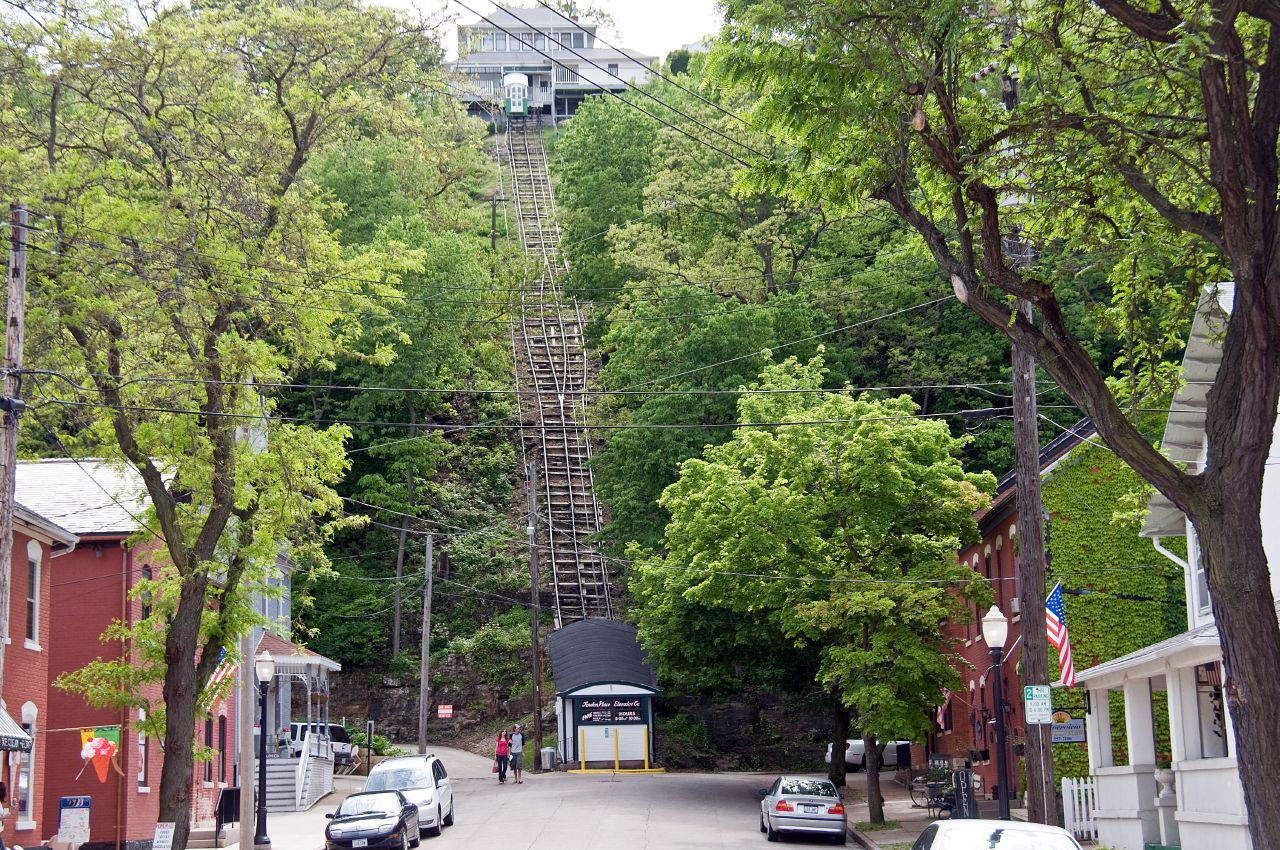
- Fenelon Place Elevator in Dubuque, Iowa

Overview
- Owner: Fenelon Place Elevator Company
- Locale: Dubuque, Iowa
- Coordinates: 42.49645°N 90.66905°W
- Termini: Hilltop
- Stations: 2

Service
- Type: Funicular
- Operator: Fenelon Place Elevator Company
- Daily ridership: N/A

Technical
- Line length: 296 feet (90 m)
- Character: Commuter rail line
- Track gauge: 3 ft (914 mm)

The Fenelon Place Elevator (also known as the Fourth Street Elevator) is a 3 ft (914 mm) narrow gauge funicular railway located in Dubuque, Iowa, United States. It was listed in the National Register of Historic Places in 1978. It was included as a contributing property in the Cathedral Historic District in 1985, and in the Fenelon Place Residential Historic District in 2015.

== History ==
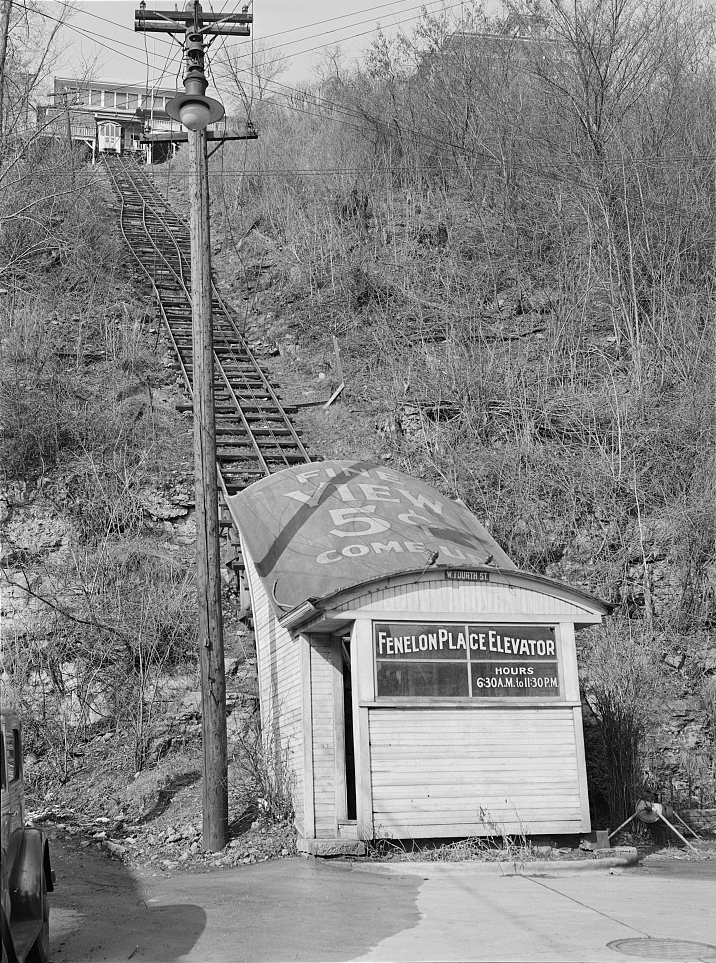
Fenelon Place Elevator in 1940

A predecessor to the Fourth Street Elevator was built in 1882 for the private use of local banker and former state senator J.K. Graves, so he could go home, eat, and take a nap on his break, since he would be unable to do so when he commuted with horses. The funicular was opened to the public in 1884, charging 5 cents per ride. After several fires, the existing funicular was rebuilt in 1893 on the footprint of the 1882 incline; the 1893 funicular inaugurated the use of the cable car technology that continues in use.

== Location ==
The upper station of the elevator is located at 512 Fenelon Place, while the lower station is located at the western end of Fourth Street. At the top, there are two observation decks, which offer a commanding view of the downtown Dubuque area. The states of Iowa, Illinois, and Wisconsin can all be seen from the observation decks.

== Function ==
The funicular is 296 feet (90 m) long, and angles up at 41 degrees with a vertical elevation of 189 feet (57.6 m). The two cars start at opposite ends, passing each other at the midpoint of the elevator. The two cars counterbalance each other, drawing motive power from an engine in the station house at the top of the hill. The engine only needs to overcome inertia and friction and compensate for the varying weight of the passengers in the cars.

== Notability ==
The 4th Street Elevator is one of the few remaining funicular railways in the United States, making it a rare attraction.

The 4th Street Elevator is also known as the "World's Shortest and Steepest Scenic Railway", though a more accurate claim would be that it is the shortest, steepest railroad in the United States.

== See also ==
- List of funicular railways
