= Dubuque Arboretum and Botanical Gardens =

Arboretum and botanical gardens in Iowa, U.S.

Dubuque Arboretum & Botanical Gardens
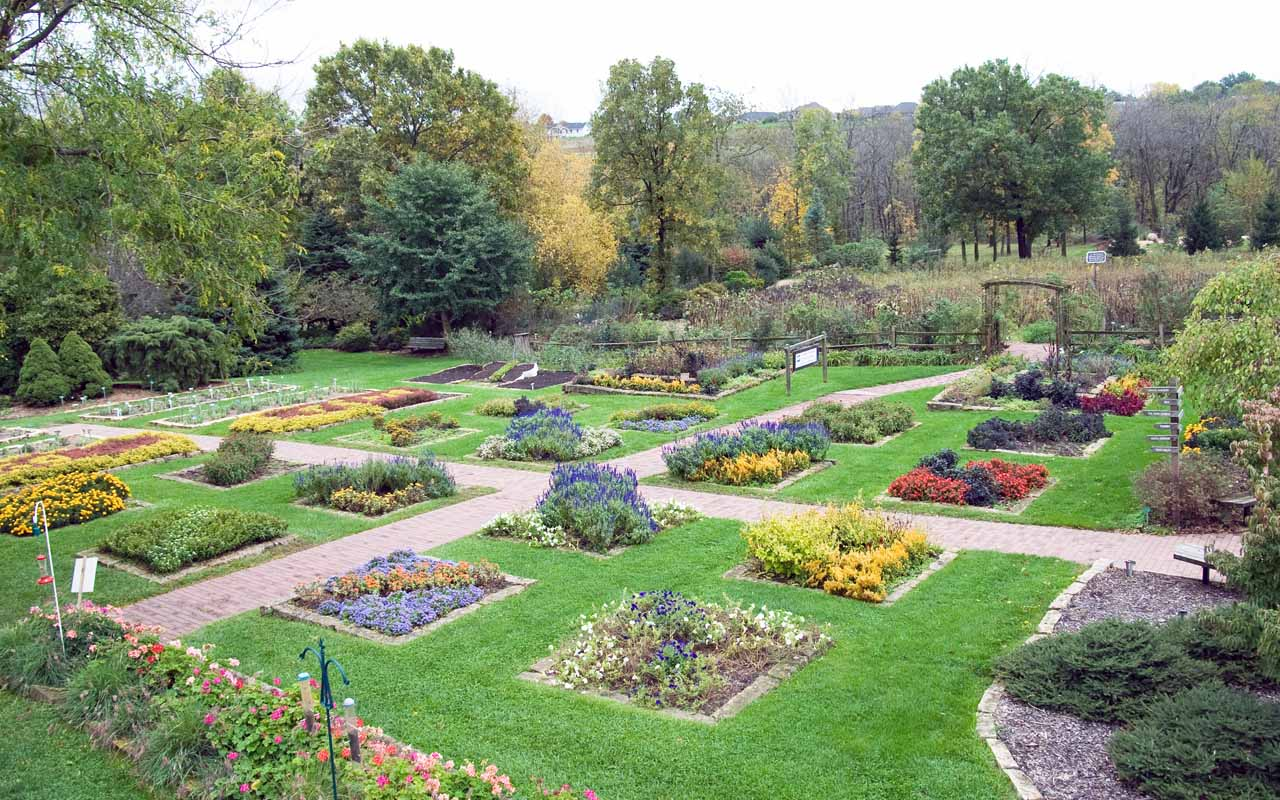
- Flower gardens in the arboretum
- Interactive map of Dubuque Arboretum & Botanical Gardens
- Type: Arboretum & Botanical gardens
- Location: Dubuque, Iowa
- Coordinates: 42.5323°N 90.7177°W
- Area: 56 acres (230,000 m^{2})
- Created: 1980
- Operator: Volunteers
- Open: Daily (7a to dusk)

The Dubuque Arboretum and Botanical Gardens, or Marshall Park, is a 56 acres (230,000 m^{2}) arboretum and botanical gardens established in 1980. The park's address is 3800 Arboretum Drive, Dubuque, Iowa. It is open, without charge, daily from dawn to dusk throughout the year.

Among the attractions are Japanese and English gardens, various flower gardens and trees, a veterans memorial and a visitor center.

== History ==
The body of a woman was found in the park in February 2021. Her ex-boyfriend was found guilty of the murder.

In 2025, the Arboretum unveiled a 30-year master plan, including plans for a 3,500-seat amphitheater and a canopy walkway.

== See also ==
- Parks in Dubuque, Iowa
- List of botanical gardens in the United States
- Herb garden
