= Alfred Caldwell Lily Pool =

Landmark in Chicago, Illinois, U.S.

Coordinates: 41.9253°N 87.6341°W

- Lincoln Park Lily Pool
- U.S. National Register of Historic Places
- U.S. National Historic Landmark District
- U.S. Historic district – Contributing property
- Chicago Landmark
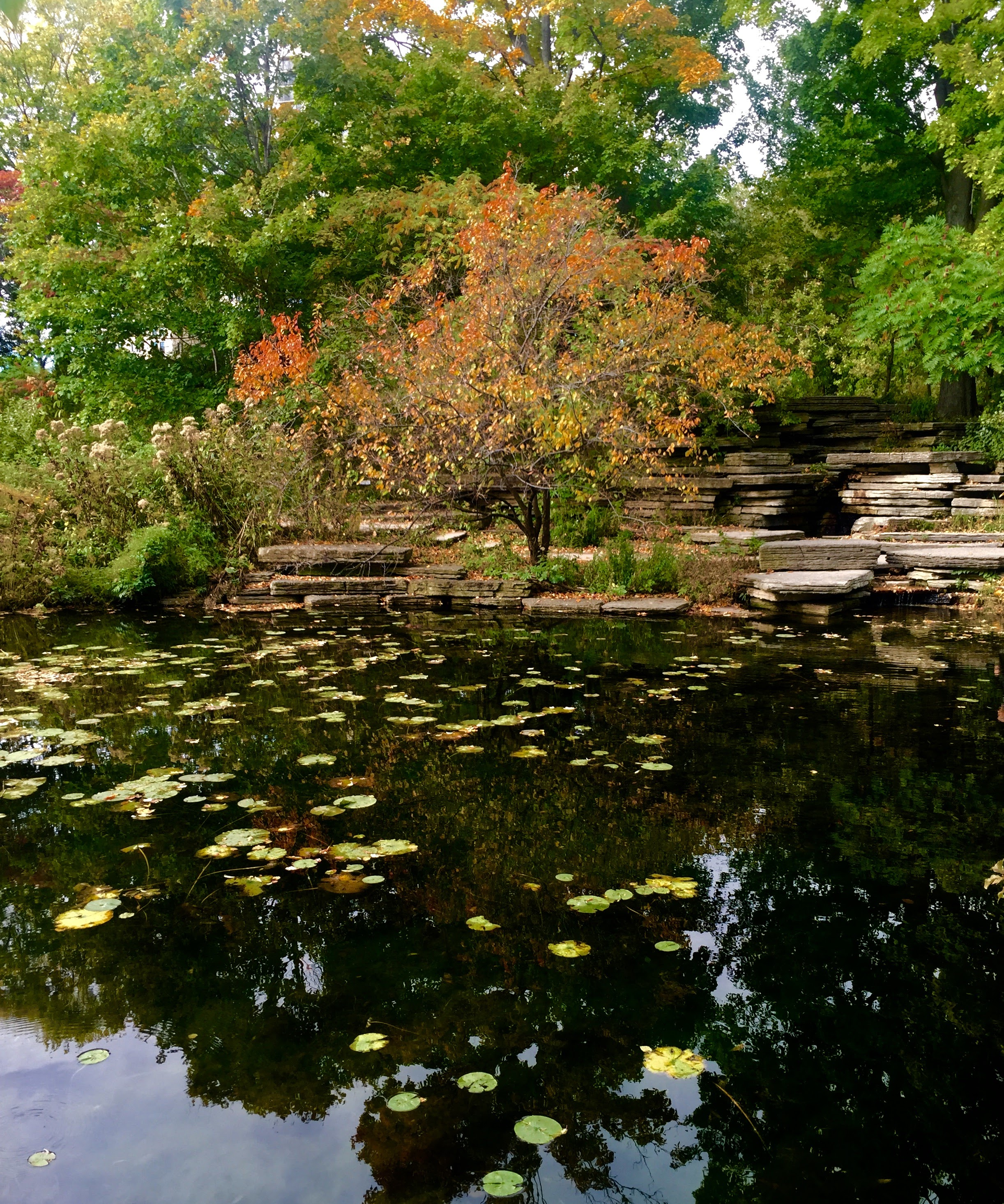

- Location within Chicago Location within Illinois Location within the United States
- Location: Fullerton Parkway between Cannon and Stockton Drives in Lincoln Park, Chicago, IL
- Area: 3 acres (1.2 ha)
- Built: 1938; 88 years ago
- Architect: Alfred Caldwell
- Part of: Lincoln Park (ID94001029)
- NRHP reference No.: 06000235

Significant dates
- Added to NRHP: February 17, 2006
- Designated NHLD: February 17, 2006
- Designated CP: August 26, 1994
- Designated CHICL: November 6, 2002

The Alfred Caldwell Lily Pool, also known as Lincoln Park Lily Pool, is an important example of Prairie School landscape architecture designed by Alfred Caldwell and located at 125 W. Fullerton Parkway (between Stockton and Cannon Drives) in Lincoln Park, Chicago, Illinois. Developed in 1936–1938, it is one of Caldwell's most fully realized designs. It was designated a Chicago Landmark on November 6, 2002. It was listed on the National Register of Historic Places and as a National Historic Landmark on February 17, 2006.

== History ==
A Victorian-style artificially heated lily pool had originally been built in 1889 at the behest of Lincoln Park Commission Superintendent John Pettigrew to cultivate tropical water lilies. The pool area is located just north of Lincoln Park Zoo and next to the Lincoln Park Conservatory.

In the early 1950s, under Zoo Director Marlin Perkins, the pool was transformed into a water exhibit featuring exotic birds and water fowl and came to be known as The Rookery. Overgrazing by zoo birds had a devastating effect on the lily pond. A lack of landscaping management allowed invasive plants and "weed" trees to take over the understory. Combined with heavy human foot traffic, uncontrolled erosion, the introduction of plants materials that were invasive to the existing lilies, and inappropriate repairs (eroded areas covered with loose stones) this resulted in what Caldwell called (in 1990) "a dead world".

From 1998 to 2002, the 2.7 acre Lily Pool underwent a major restoration by the Chicago Park District and the Lincoln Park Conservancy. The Friends of Lincoln Park (now called The Lincoln Park Conservancy) raised $1.2 million toward the restoration of the lily pools. A similar sum was obtained from a grant from the USDA Forest Service. Wolff Landscape Architecture was hired to complete the project.

Five focus groups were conducted to develop a consensus plan for restoration of the site;

1. experts in historic preservation,
2. bird watchers and ecologists,
3. Individuals knowledgeable about Lincoln Park and active in its planning and management,
4. activists and experts on the subject of accessibility,
5. members of the general public.

The Lily Pool closed in 2023 for renovation and reopened on September 8, 2025. The work included rebuilding the wooden pavilions, adding native plants and adjusting the waterfall's flow. The Chicago Park District and the Lincoln Park Conservancy manage a docent program at the Caldwell Lily Pool.

== Location ==
The Lily Pool's main gate is on the south side of Fullerton Parkway between Stockton and Cannon Drives (125 W Fullerton Parkway).

The Lily Pool is open seasonally from mid-April to mid-November from 7:30 a.m. to the earlier of dusk or 7:30 p.m. It is maintained by the Chicago Park District and Lincoln Park Conservancy.

Free docent tours are available to the public on Fridays, Saturdays or Sundays from the Spring through Fall.

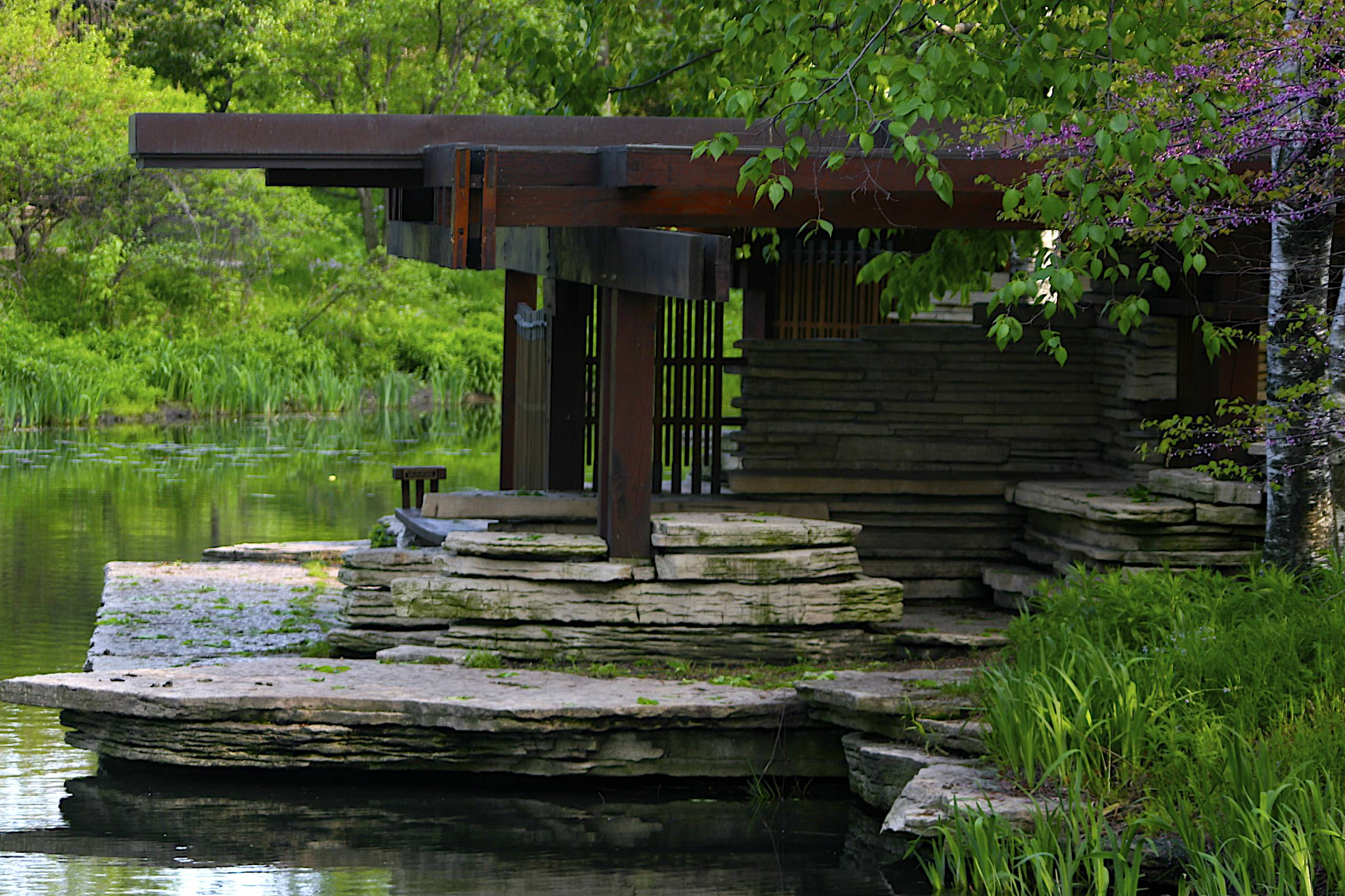
May 2007

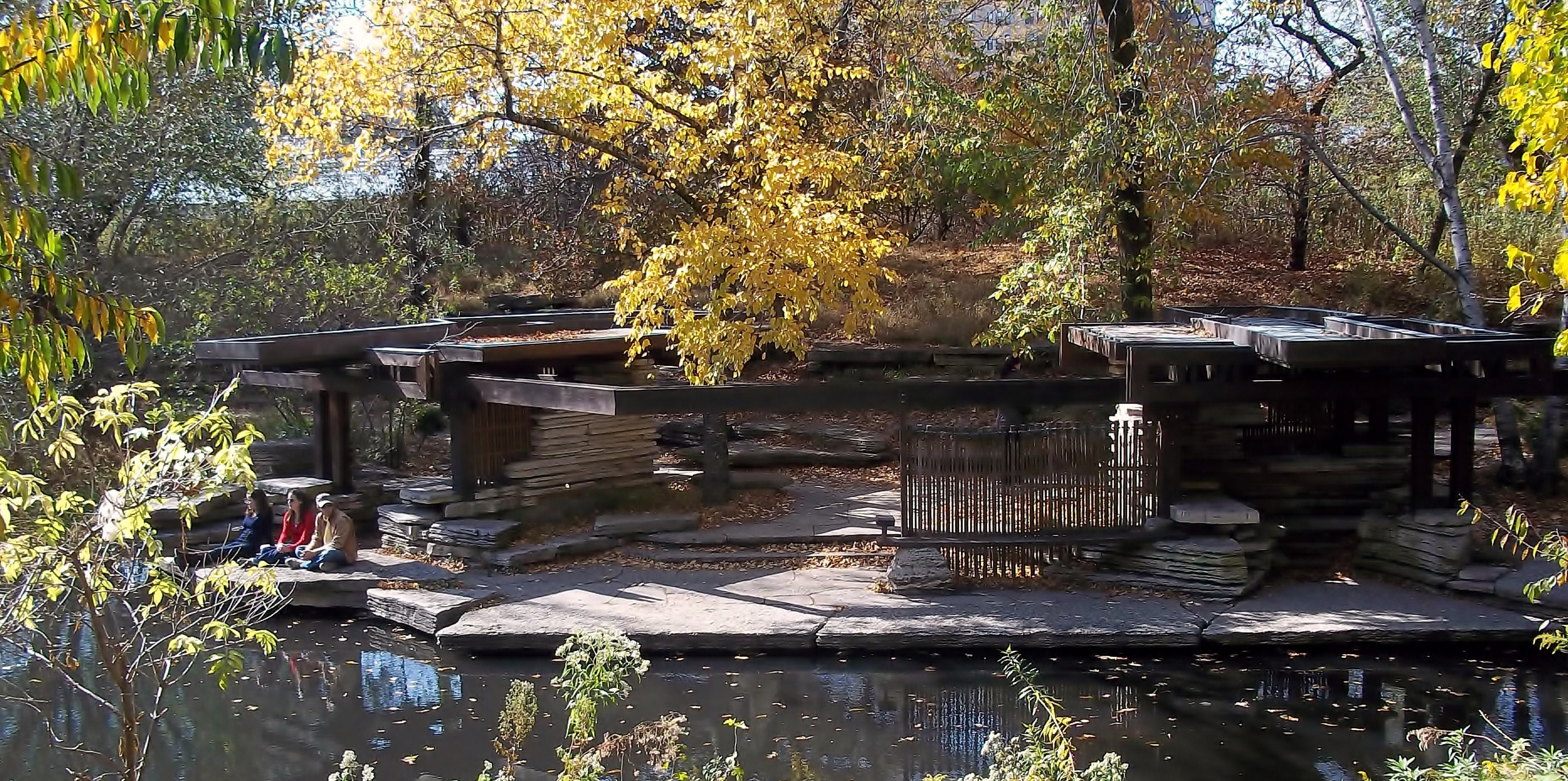
October 2010

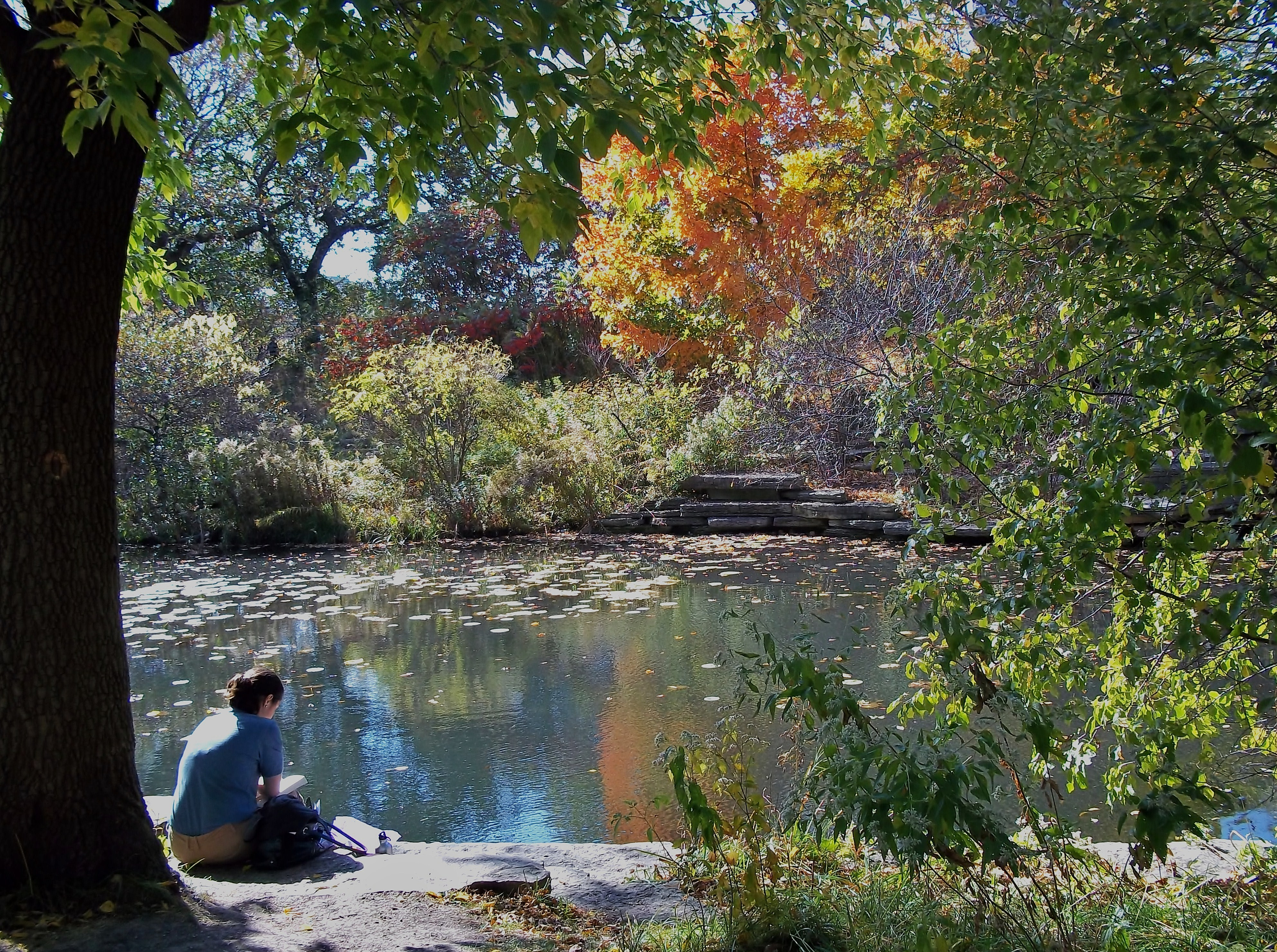
Pool in Fall 2010

== See also ==
- National Register of Historic Places listings in Chicago
- List of National Historic Landmarks in Illinois
