= Heritage Trail (Iowa) =

Rail trail in Iowa, United States

Coordinates: 42.553°N 90.709°W

Heritage Trail is a 26-mile (42 km) long, multiuse rail trail connecting Dubuque and Dyersville, Iowa.

It is maintained by the Dubuque County Conservation Board, and was converted from a segment of the former Chicago Great Western railroad line between Chicago and Oelwein, Iowa. It is mostly surfaced with compacted, crushed limestone. The county and the city of Dyersville recently sought to have the two mile segment adjacent to Dyersville paved.

== See also ==
- List of rail trails
- Parks in Dubuque, Iowa
