= Cathedral Historic District (Dubuque, Iowa) =

Historic district in Iowa, United States

- U.S. National Register of Historic Places
- U.S. Historic district
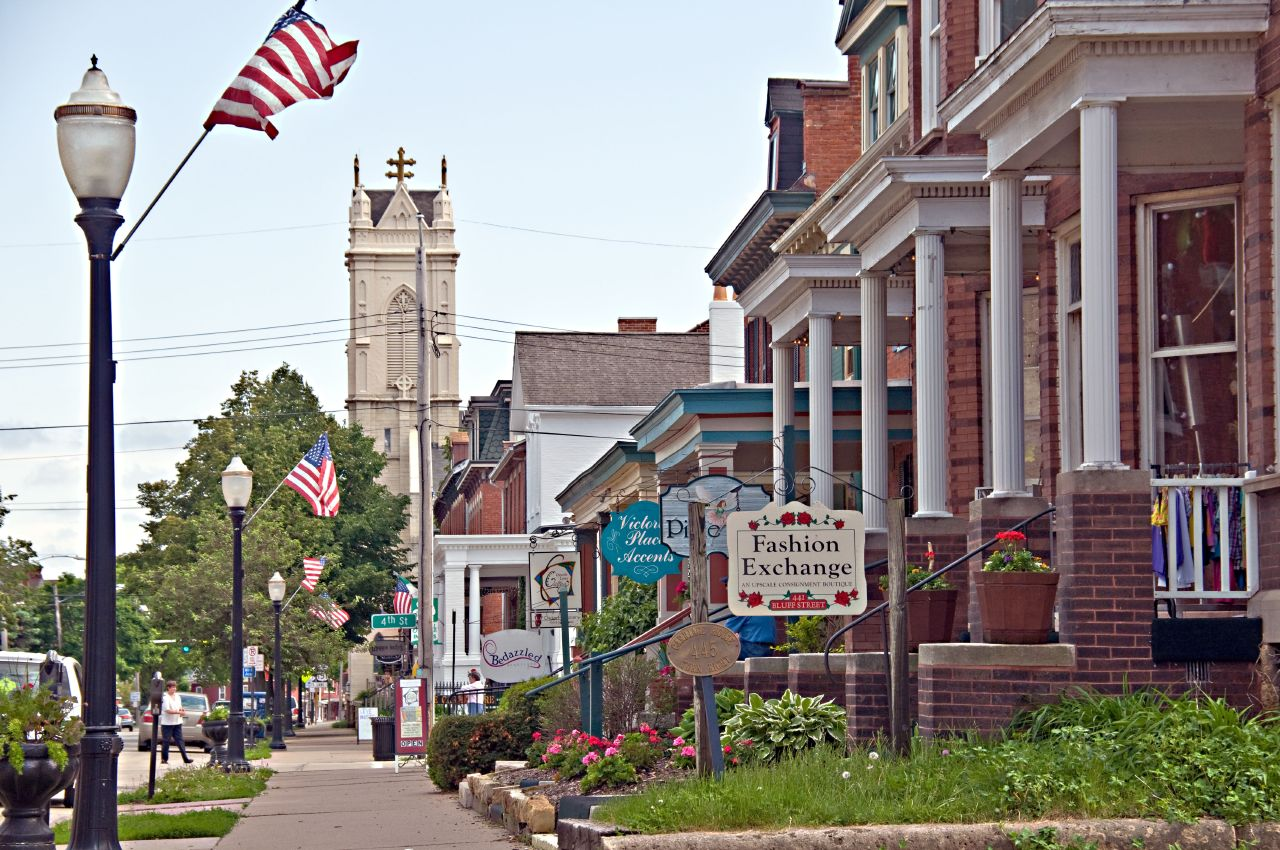
- The view along Bluff Street with the cathedral tower in the distance.

- Location within Iowa Location within the United States
- Location: Roughly bounded by a bluffline running W. of Bluff St., W. 7th, Locust and Jones Sts., Dubuque, Iowa
- Coordinates: 42°29′48″N 90°40′3″W
- Area: 32 acres (13 ha)
- Built: 1850
- Architectural style: Greek Revival; Italianate; Federal
- NRHP reference No.: 85002501
- Added to NRHP: September 25, 1985

Cathedral Historic District is a nationally recognized historic district located in Dubuque, Iowa, United States. It was listed on the National Register of Historic Places in 1985. At the time of its nomination it consisted of 124 resources, which included 96 contributing buildings, one contributing site, one contributing structure and 26 non-contributing buildings. The district was the first residential area in Dubuque, and developed into a tightly knit neighborhood. It is located west of the original commercial district and below the bluffs of the Mississippi River that rise steeply to the west. Although its original structures no longer stand, its historic buildings are largely from the mid to late 19th century. St. Raphael's Cathedral complex, from which the district receives its name, was important in serving immigrants, including most of the Irish immigrants to the city, and in building ties. In 1985, the district was deemed to have retained "most of its original character and fabric" from the late 1800s. Washington Park (contributing site), J.H. Thedinga House (1855), Fenelon Place Elevator (1882; contributing structure), and Redstone (1888) are all individually listed on the National Register.
