= Lincoln Park Conservatory =

Conservatory and botanical garden in Lincoln Park in Chicago, Illinois

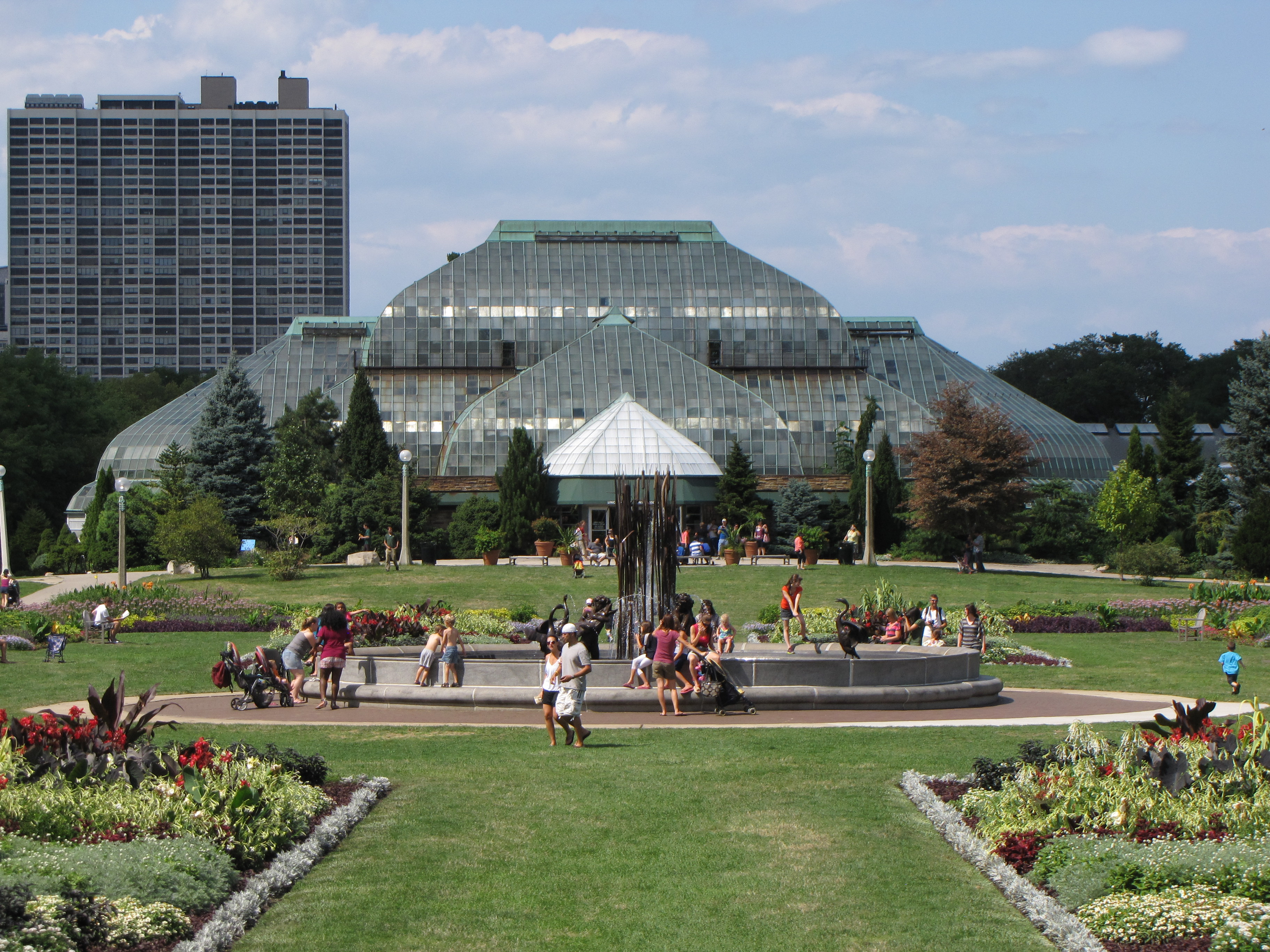
- Lincoln Park Conservatory and the Great Garden
- Established: 1877; in present location since 1893
- Location: 2391 North Stockton Drive, Chicago, Illinois, USA; 60614
- Coordinates: 41.9240°N 87.6353°W
- Director: Mary Eysenbach
- Public transit access: CTA
- Website: Official website

The Lincoln Park Conservatory (1.2 ha / 3 acres) is a conservatory and botanical garden in Lincoln Park in Chicago, Illinois. The conservatory is located at 2391 North Stockton Drive just south of Fullerton Avenue, west of Lake Shore Drive, and part of the Lincoln Park, Chicago community area. The Alfred Caldwell Lily Pool and the North Pond Nature Sanctuary are further to the north along Stockton Drive. Along with the Garfield Park Conservatory on Chicago's west side, the Lincoln Park Conservatory provides significant horticultural collections, educational programs and community outreach efforts.

Lincoln Park Conservatory is a Victorian Era glass house, built in late nineteenth century. It contains four rooms displaying exotic plants from around the world. Rare orchids, like the Moth orchid, can be found in the Orchid room.

A formal garden is situated in front of the Conservatory; one of the oldest public gardens in Chicago, designed and planted in the late 1870s. Since its foundation, the Formal Garden has been the home of several sculptures and works of art. The most famous are the Bates fountains, the Schiller monument, along with Sir George Solti's bust, which was relocated to Grant Park in 2006. The well-known Shakespeare monument is located across the street in the Grandmother's Garden, which was formerly known as Old English Garden. The Formal Garden is planted between May and June. Though the peak viewing time is between July and August, the display lasts till mid-October.

== History ==
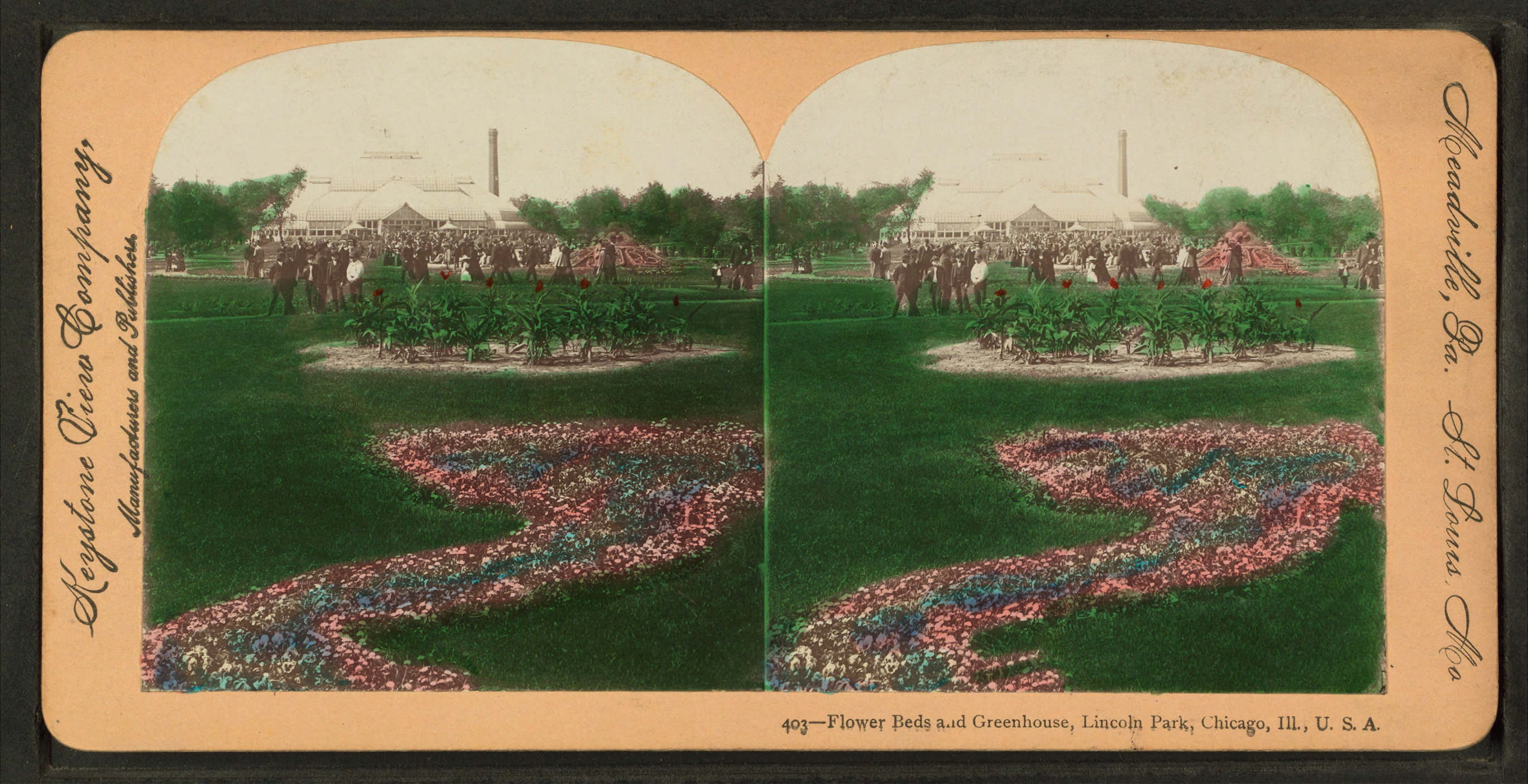
Stereoscope image of the conservatory circa 1900

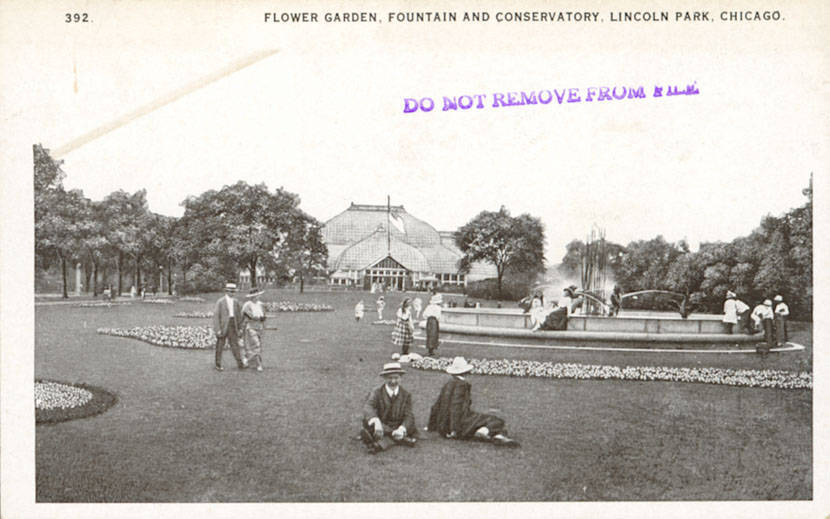

Conservatories were originally benevolent establishments attached to hospitals or other charitable or religious institutions. They provided plants and organisms for medicinal use and research. In the early nineteenth century, the development of iron and glass building technology led to the constructions of conservatories in major cities in the United States as well as other countries in the world. Chicago had become overcrowded as its population had increased rapidly.

With a growing concern about the ill effect of industrialization, interest in collecting and classifying plant life became very popular. The city leaders decided to build a new and more substantial conservatory to replace a small greenhouse built in the 1870s. Architects Joseph Lyman Silsbee and M.E. Bell designed and built an exotic-style glass conservatory which was described as "a paradise under glass". Originally, the aquatic plants were placed in a heated pond outside. They were later moved into tanks inside the conservatory. The Conservatory's exotic plans were so popular that in 1897, the Egyptian government asked the Conservatory for seeds of water lilies flowers.

== Architects ==
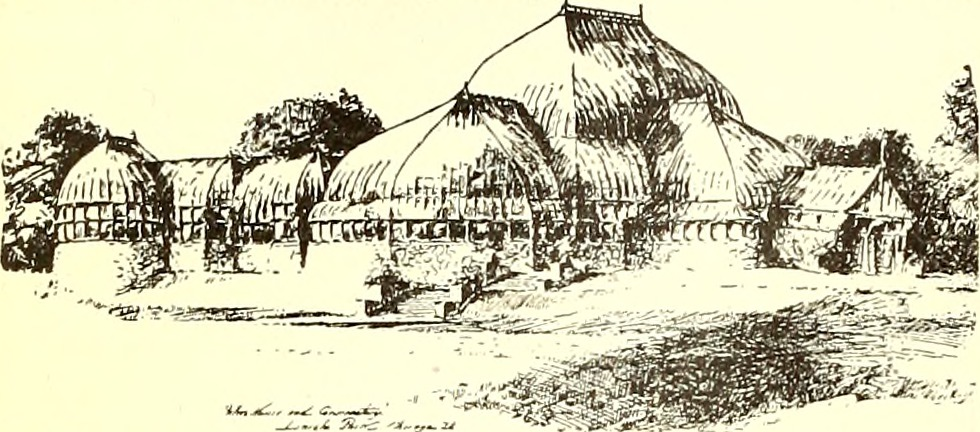
'New Conservatory at Lincoln Park, Chicago' - Image from page 147 of "American gardening" (1892)

The Lincoln Park Conservatory was built between 1890 and 1895 by Lincoln Park's Commission. The Lincoln Park Commission established a greenhouse at the Lincoln Park site in 1877 and planted an adjacent formal garden in 1880. Due to the fascination of horticulture among the city dwellers, Lincoln Park's small greenhouse was no longer sufficient for all the plants. Large conservatories with different plants and exhibit rooms were gaining popularity. Nationally renowned architect Joseph Lyman Silsbee designed the Victorian conservatory in collaboration with another Chicago architect, Mifflin E. Bell. Between 1890 and 1895 they created a glass building that would support "a luxuriant tropical growth, blending the whole into a natural grouping of Nature's loveliest forms". Silsbee gave the conservatory an exotic form by creating a series of trusses in the shape of ogee arches.

== Halls ==
The Fernery

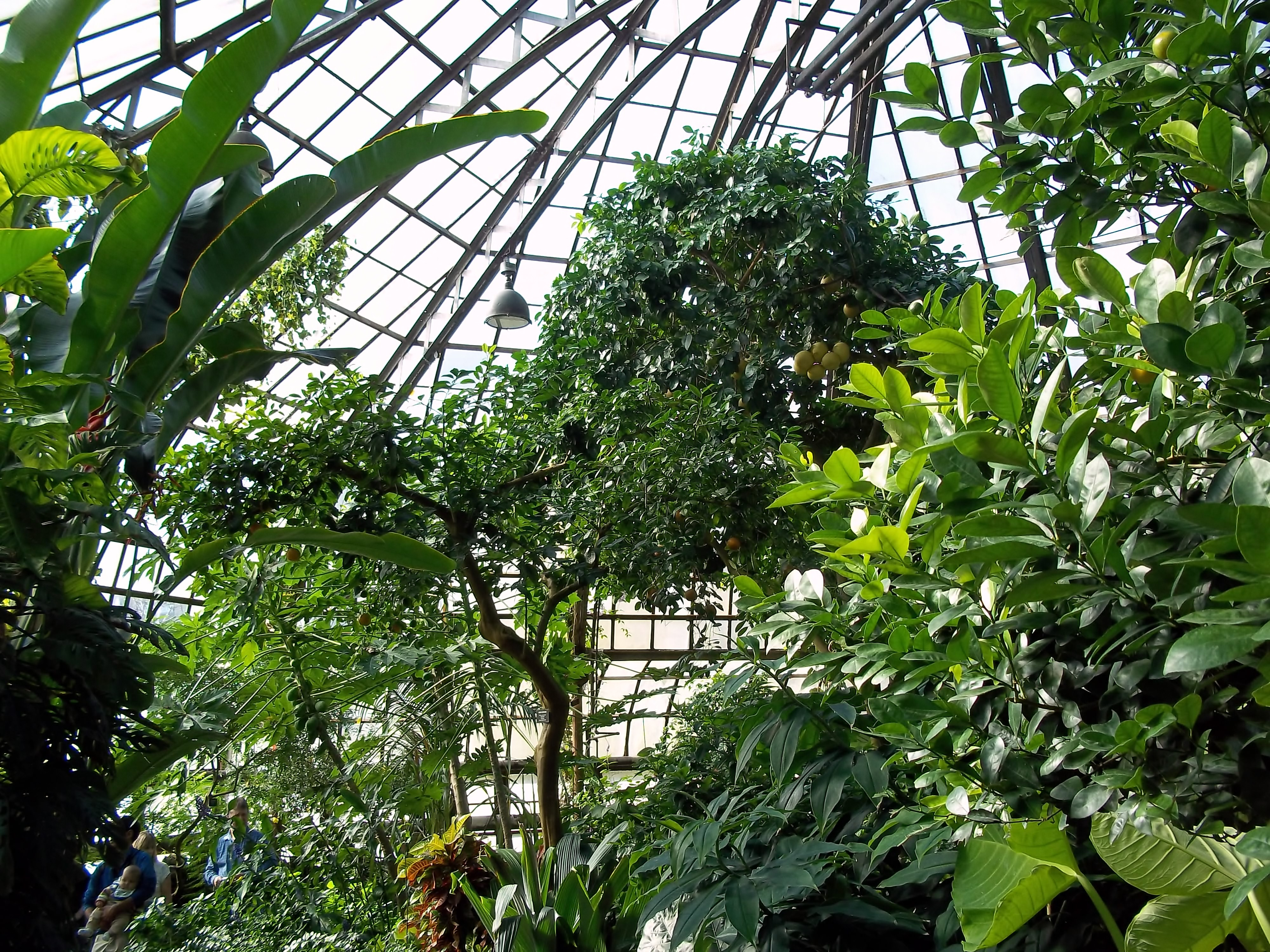
Palm House and architectural detail

The conservatory consists of a vestibule, four display halls and fifteen propagating and growing houses. The vestibule and Palm House were built and opened to the public in 1892 and contain giant palms and rubber trees, including a 15 m (50 ft) fiddle-leaf rubber tree planted in 1891. The Palm House, has a display of more than twelve different types of palms. The most unusual palms include Dwarf Sugar, Bottle, Fiji Fan, and Everglade palms. Some of the most recognized palms include the pygmy date plan and the coconut palm due to its fruit. Furthermore, this large house also includes plants that produce food: banana plants, a grapefruit tree, orange trees, papaya plants, a coffee tree, and a cacao tree, among others. The Palm House contains Garden Figure, a sculpture by Frederick Hibbard.

The Fern Room or Fernery, approximately five and a half feet below grade, was opened in 1895. It contains plants of the forest floor, primarily a vast collection of ferns and one of the most historical plants, the cycads. Fossils of these plants date back at least 250 million years. These plants are similar to conifers and the ginkgo tree rather than palm trees.

The Tropical Room was originally called the stove house. Opened in 1895, it contained an assortment of tropical plants suspended from bark-covered walls. It is now called the Orchid Room and has a collection of approximately 25,000 natural species. This room contains hundreds of orchids, bromeliads and a few tropical carnivorous plants. Orchids, just like bromeliads, get their water from the humidity in the room.

The Display House or The Show House is used for seasonal flower exhibits. The "Spring Flower Show" starts on January 21 and ends on May 13. Following that show is the "Tropical Summer Show" that starts on June 2 and runs through September 23rd. Finally, the year ends with the "Winter Flow and Train Show" that runs starts on November 24 and ends on January 6.

== Surrounding gardens ==
Throughout the long history of the conservatory, there has been an important relationship between the structure and its surrounding landscape. Twelve beds of colorful summer annuals and tropical plants surround Storks at Play, also known as the Eli Bates Fountain, by sculptors Augustus St. Gaudens and Frederick MacMonnies. This large formal garden is located just south of the Lincoln Park Conservatory. Called the Great Garden, it is one of the oldest public gardens in Chicago and pre-dates the present conservatory by 20 years. The Lincoln Park Commission installed the fountain in 1886–87. Its design was chosen by Chicago's Lincoln Memorial Fund over those of four others submitted during an 1883 competition.

The Schiller Monument, at the south end of the garden, is a copy of an original monument to German poet Friedrich Schiller. It was cast in Stuttgart, Germany, and erected in 1886 by a group known as Chicago Citizens of German Descent. The original work is regarded as the masterpiece of its sculptor, Ernst Bildhauer Rau. To the west, the William Shakespeare Monument by William Ordway Partridge sits in an old English garden. Installed in 1894, it was purchased through a bequest from Samuel Johnston, a Chicago real estate and railway tycoon.

=== Conifer Garden ===
Various conifers are planted outside, along the west side and front of the Conservatory. "Conifers are trees and shrubs with needle-like leaves that bear cones." Most of these conifers are evergreen plants.

== Alterations ==
The Lincoln Park Conservatory underwent major alterations in 1925. The original terrace and the front vestibule were removed and the entryway's original gabled roof was replaced with the bell-shaped roof that exists today. A new and expanded lobby space was constructed. The front of the conservatory was altered and expanded again in 1954 to provide public washrooms and create a solid entryway vestibule.

== See also ==
- Garfield Park Conservatory
- List of botanical gardens in the United States
- List of museums and cultural institutions in Chicago
