= Washington Park (Dubuque, Iowa) =

Small public urban park in Downtown Dubuque, Iowa, USA

- U.S. National Register of Historic Places
- U.S. Historic district – Contributing property
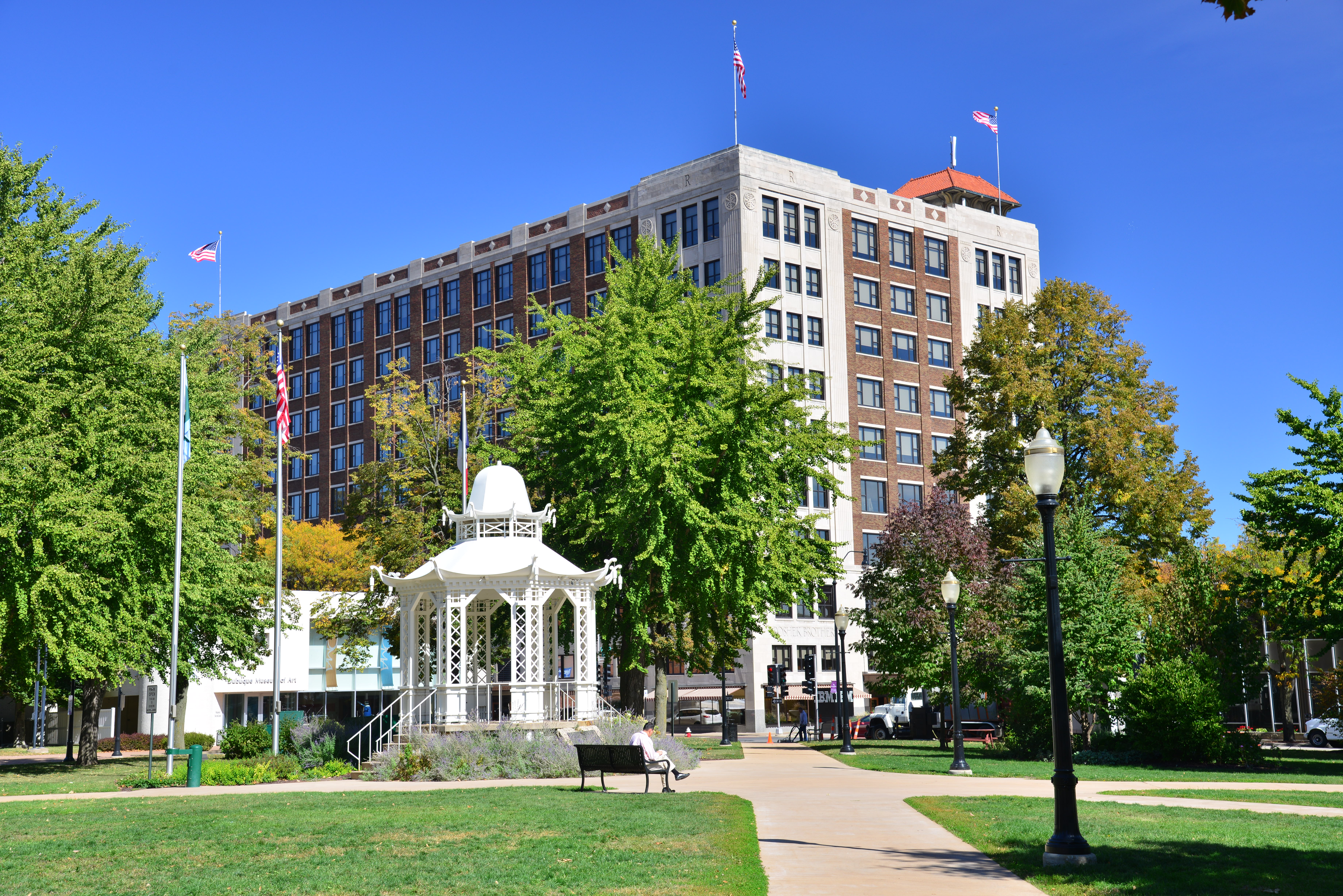
- The Gazebo at Washington Park.
- Location: Dubuque, IA
- Coordinates: 42°29′56.86″N 90°40′4.98″W
- Part of: Cathedral Historic District (ID85002501)
- NRHP reference No.: 77000515
- Added to NRHP: July 14, 1977

Washington Park (also known as Washington Square) is a small public, urban park (1 acre) located in Downtown Dubuque, Iowa, United States. The park encompasses an entire city block, bordered on the north by West 7th Street, on the west by Bluff Street, on the south by West 6th Street, and on the east by Locust Street. The park is located between the city's post office and the Dubuque Museum of Art.

It was individually listed on the National Register of Historic Places in 1977, and it was included as a contributing property in the Cathedral Historic District in 1985.

== History ==
In 1877, the Dubuque City Council had all the buildings on the block torn down. Shrubs and flowers were planted, walkways were established, and a 40-foot (12 m)-high Oriental gazebo was built on the grounds for $200.

Public events at the square over the years included Buffalo Bill Cody's "Authentic Wild West Show" performing in 1896 and President William McKinley giving a speech in 1899.

== See also ==
- Parks in Dubuque, Iowa
