= Center Township, Dubuque County, Iowa =

Center Township
- Township
- Location in Dubuque County
- Coordinates: 42°30′54″N 90°50′30″W
- Country: United States
- State: Iowa
- County: Dubuque

Area
  - Total: 36.05 sq mi (93.36 km^{2})
  - Land: 36.05 sq mi (93.36 km^{2})
  - Water: 0 sq mi (0 km^{2}) 0%
- Elevation: 732 ft (223 m)

Population (2000)
  - Total: 1,726
  - Density: 48/sq mi (18.5/km^{2})
- Time zone: UTC-6 (CST)
  - Summer (DST): UTC-5 (CDT)
- ZIP codes: 52002, 52039, 52045, 52068
- GNIS feature ID: 0467574

Center Township is one of seventeen townships in Dubuque County, Iowa, United States. As of the 2000 census, its population was 1,726.

== Geography ==
According to the United States Census Bureau, Center Township covers an area of 36.05 square miles (93.36 square kilometers).

=== Cities, towns, villages ===
- Asbury (partial)
- Centralia (north three-quarters)
- Graf

=== Unincorporated towns ===
- Budd at 42.533056°N 90.815684°W
- Five Points at 42.551388°N 90.858462°W
- Lattnerville at 42.485557°N 90.882908°W
- Lore at 42.518057°N 90.799850°W
- Twin Springs at 42.515278°N 90.840407°W

(This list is based on USGS data and may include former settlements.)

=== Adjacent townships ===
- Jefferson Township (north)
- Peru Township (northeast)
- Dubuque Township (east)
- Vernon Township (south)
- Taylor Township (southwest)
- Iowa Township (west)
- Concord Township (northwest)

=== Cemeteries ===
The township contains these three cemeteries: Annunciation, Centralia Presbyterian and Saint Johns the Baptist Catholic Cemetery.

== School districts ==
- Dubuque Community School District
- Western Dubuque Community School District

== Political districts ==
- Iowa's 1st congressional district
- State House District 32
- State Senate District 16
