= Iowa Highway 32 =

Former state highway in Iowa, United States

Iowa Highway 32
- Northwest Arterial
- Iowa 32 highlighted in red

Route information
- Maintained by Iowa DOT
- Length: 5.101 mi (8.209 km)
- Existed: 1995–2020

Major junctions
- South end: US 20 in Dubuque
- North end: US 52 / Iowa 3 in Sageville

Location
- Country: United States
- State: Iowa
- Counties: Dubuque

Highway system
- Iowa Primary Highway System; Interstate; US; State; Secondary; Scenic
← US 32	→ US 34

Iowa Highway 32 (Iowa 32), also known as the Northwest Arterial, was a state highway that ran through the northwest quadrant of Dubuque. At just over 5 miles (8.0 km) long, it was among the shortest state highways in the state. The highway began at U.S. Highway 20 in Dubuque and ended at US 52 / Iowa 3 in Sageville. With the exception of a small portion at the northern end, the entire highway was within the Dubuque city limits.

== Route description ==
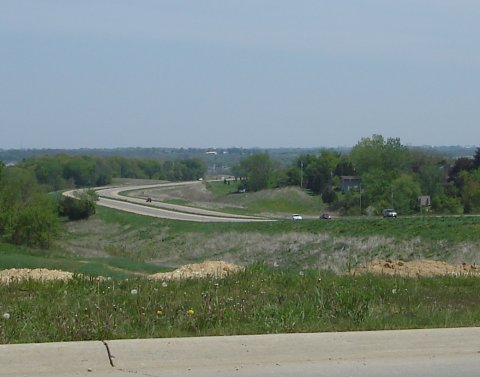
A section of Iowa Highway 32 north of the intersection with John F. Kennedy Road.

Iowa Highway 32 began at an intersection with US 20 in Dubuque. From US 20, Iowa 32 headed north and immediately dropped 100 feet (30 m) in elevation into the valley of the middle fork of Catfish Creek. It headed back uphill and intersected Pennsylvania Avenue. One mile (1.6 km) north of this intersection was another intersection with Asbury Road, named for the small town located three-quarters mile (1.2 km) west of the intersection.

North of Asbury Road, the Northwest Arterial was flanked on both sides of the road by retail establishments, most of which popped up in the early-2000s. The highway made a 45° turn to the northeast, heading towards Sageville. Just to the northeast was an intersection with John F. Kennedy Road (JFK), which for the first six years of Iowa 32's existence, was the northern end of the route. Northeast of JFK, the highway passed the Dubuque Arboretum and Botanical Gardens. Just to the northeast of the arboretum was the intersection with US 52 / Iowa 3 in Sageville.

== History ==
Iowa 32 was originally envisioned in the 1970s as part of Dubuque's long-range transportation improvement plan. The road was planned as a four-lane highway bypass and alternate route to U.S. 52, which runs as a city street through Downtown Dubuque. Construction began in the early 1980s on a two-lane section, which stretched from U.S. 20 (Dodge Street) to John F. Kennedy Road.

The city turned the highway over to state control in 1995, where it was marked as Iowa Highway 32. By 1997, work was finished on the additional two lanes, and the road was a four-lane divided highway. In 2002, the state completed a four-lane extension of the highway north to US 52 / Iowa 3, creating a bypass from US 20 to US 52 / Iowa 3.

Since the completion of the highway, there has been significant growth along the Northwest Arterial corridor. The largest developments include Asbury Plaza, Iowa's 8th-largest shopping center, and Medical Associates Clinic's West Campus. In addition to these, several business parks and residential subdivisions have been built in the corridor. This growth, and its subsequent increase in traffic, has placed strains on the road, and has led to the installation of numerous stoplights. The growth has also led to more traffic accidents, particularly at the Asbury Road and U.S. 20 (Dodge Street) intersections.

The Northwest Arterial is the third highway to be designated as Iowa 32. The first Highway 32 was in Cherokee County, Iowa, extending from Iowa Highway 5 to Cleghorn, Iowa, and was in existence from 1920 to 1926. A route from Iowa Highway 9 near Spirit Lake, Iowa to U.S. Highway 71 in Milford, Iowa served as the second Iowa Highway 32 from 1934 to 1980.

With the planned realignment of US 52 away from Iowa 32's northern terminus to the as-yet-unbuilt Southwest Arterial, the Iowa Transportation Commission approved turning the highway over to the cities of Dubuque and Sageville at their meeting January 10, 2017. Transfer of jurisdiction was dependent on the completion of the Southwest Arterial, which opened in August 2020.

== Major intersections ==
The entire route was in Dubuque County.

Location	mi	km	Destinations	Notes
Dubuque	0.000	0.000	US 20 (Dodge Street)	Southern terminus
Dubuque	3.109	5.003	John F. Kennedy Road	
Sageville	5.101	8.209	US 52 / Iowa 3 (Central Avenue) / CR Y35 (South John Deere Road) / Great River Road	Northern terminus
1.000 mi = 1.609 km; 1.000 km = 0.621 mi

== See also ==
- Southwest Arterial
