= Dubuque Community School District =

Public school district in Dubuque, Iowa, United States

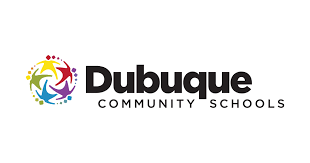

Location
- Dubuque, Iowa Dubuque and Jackson counties United States
- Coordinates: 42.511268°N 90.704544°W

District information
- Type: Local school district
- Motto: “Unfolding Potential”
- Grades: Prek-12
- Established: 1886
- Superintendent: Amy Hawkins
- Schools: 17
- Budget: $167,988,000 (2020-21)
- NCES District ID: 1909480

Students and staff
- Students: 10,518
- Teachers: 819.13 FTE
- Staff: 925.92 FTE
- Student–teacher ratio: 12.84
- Athletic conference: Mississippi Valley

Other information
- Website: www.dbqschools.org

The Dubuque Community School District (DCSD) is a public school district based in Dubuque, Iowa, United States. DCSD, which operates schools in eastern Dubuque County, is the seventh largest school district in Iowa. As of the 2021-2022 school year, DCSD has 10,535 students enrolled in its schools.

== General information ==
DCSD serves an area covering 245 square miles (630 km^{2}), including most of the eastern half of Dubuque County, and a small portion of northern Jackson County. This area includes the city of Dubuque and the outlying communities of: Asbury, Durango, Graf, Rickardsville, Sageville, Sherrill, and St. Donatus.

DCSD is one of the largest employers in the city of Dubuque, with 1,876 employees, 846 of which are teachers. The number of district employees has been rising in recent years due to new school construction, and the expansion of existing schools. From 2003-2006, DCSD hired 268 new full- and part-time teachers.

The district currently operates:

- 11 elementary schools which all have a pre-school option
- 3 middle schools
- 2 high schools
- 1 alternative high school
- 2 support buildings
- 1 administration building

DCSD is governed by a 7-member elected school board and is managed by an appointed Superintendent of Schools. Current school board members include Kate Parks, Nancy Bradley, Katie Jones, Jim Prochaska, Tami Ryan, Anderson Sainci and Lisa Wittman. The Superintendent of Schools is Amy Hawkins.

DCSD's budget for the 2021-2022 school year was $156,808,000.

=== Enrollment ===
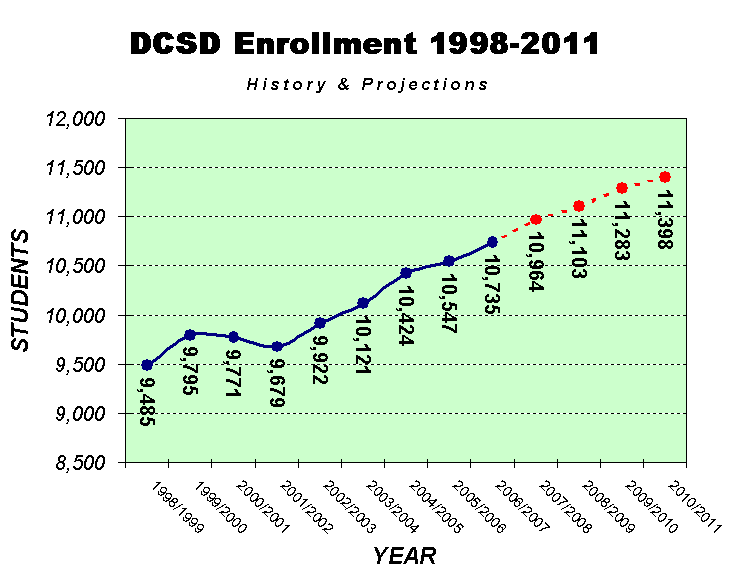
Enrollment history & projections for the Dubuque Community School District 1998-2011.

In the 2023–2024 school year, 10,535 are enrolled in DCSD. Of those, 27.4% are economically challenged according to U.S. News & World Report.

=== Recent developments ===
In December 2002, Dubuque County voters approved a 1% Local-Option Sales Tax, which expired after 10 years, on June 30, 2013. The extra revenue generated from the tax paid for the construction of new schools and renovation of existing schools in all Dubuque County School Districts. DCSD was estimated to collect $96.6 million over the 10-year span. To date, the DCSD has invested $67.8 million in new and renovated schools. Sales tax dollars have been used in the construction of Roosevelt Middle School (opened 2005), Carver Elementary School (opened 2007), Prescott Elementary School (rebuilt 2006), and renovation/construction projects at Kennedy Elementary School, Table Mound Elementary School, and Hempstead High School. Approximately $10.5 million was spent on the Dalzell Field Reconstruction at Dubuque Senior High School, which was completed in April 2013. The field features 3,125 new spectator seats and the digital display on the scoreboard is 20 feet by 11 feet – one of the largest of its kind in the region.

In 2008 Iowa passed a State Penny for School Infrastructure sales tax. This tax replaced the county local option sales taxes throughout Iowa. After the district’s local option sales tax expired the statewide tax took effect on July 1, 2013. It is anticipated that the FY 2013-14 sales tax collections will exceed $8 million.

== Schools in DCSD ==
=== Elementary schools ===
- Audubon Elementary School
- Bryant Elementary School
- Carver Elementary School
- Eisenhower Elementary School
- Irving Elementary School
- Kennedy Elementary School
- Lincoln Elementary School
- Marshall Elementary School
- Prescott Elementary School
- Sageville Elementary School
- Table Mound Elementary School

=== Middle schools ===
- Jefferson Middle School
- Roosevelt Middle School
- Washington Middle School

=== High schools ===
- Hempstead High School
- Dubuque Senior High School
- Alta Vista Alternative Learning Center and Connect Program

=== Former schools ===
- Central Alternative High School - closed in 2010.
- Fulton Elementary School- closed in 2022.
- Hoover Elementary School-closed in 2025.

== See also ==
- Dubuque, Iowa
- List of school districts in Iowa
