= Dubuque Packing Company =

Former meat packing company in Iowa, U.S.

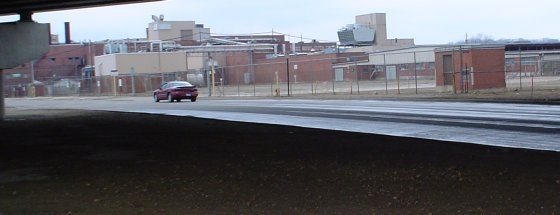
The former Dubuque Packing Company plant

The Dubuque Packing Company was a meat packing company that operated under a variety of names in Dubuque, Iowa from 1891 until 2001. In the 1950s, the company became the second-largest employer in the city. By the 1960s, the number of employees in the company's workforce rose to approximately 3,500 and the quality of their products became significantly distinguishable and recognizable by winning gold medals in the 1960 and 1961 California State Fairs. Throughout the 1970s and 1980s, the company was widely known in the community as "the Pack" using the fleur-de-lis logo as its trademark and was a prominent force in Dubuque's economy which saw thousands of locals being dependent on Dubuque Pack either directly or indirectly.

== History ==
In June 1891, the Dubuque Packing Company was founded by the merger of the Dubuque Packing & Provision Company and the Dubuque Butchers Association. Until the early 1930s, the company acted as a local meat supplier. In 1931, H. W. Wahlert purchased the plant with the Christian Schmitt family of St. Louis. At the time of the purchase, the company employed only sixty people. The new firm was incorporated with Wahlert as president and underwent a massive renovation including extra refrigeration and the addition of rooms where unconsumable items were kept separated from the rest of the plant. Despite the Great Depression, the organization grew rapidly under Wahlert's leadership including the production of canned hams — the first food product America exported after World War II.

In the 1950s, the company became the second-largest employer in Dubuque. Employment reached 3,500 in the 1960s and sales supported a payroll of $20 million by the 1970s. During the organization's most successful period, the company operated 12 plants with sales near $2 billion. At its peak, it was the third largest beef processing plant in the United States.

In 1948, ten employees of the Dubuque Packing Company pooled $5 each, in combination with a loan for $123.20 from the Amalgamated Meat Cutters Local Number 150, to charter Dupaco Credit Union, which eventually became Dupaco Community Credit Union.

Labor union negotiations with the company made workers at the plant some of the highest-paid employees in the city. Dun's Review listed the company as the fifteenth-largest privately held company in the United States in 1978, with sales of about $390 million. At its peak, the company's sales approached $2 billion and it had 12 plants. It was the third-largest beef slaughter in the U.S.

The company was also recognized for the quality of the products they made. In 1960 and 1961, the company won gold medals at the California State Fairs for their canned hams. They also became one of the largest suppliers of kosher meat in the United States.

By the 1980s, the Dubuque plant began to decline. In 1980 the Dubuque Packing Company announced that they lost $9.9 million through beef operations at its Dubuque facility. They asked the union for concessions, based on claims of market changes, high wages, and equipment problems. The company also shut down parts of the plant. By 1981, nearly 1,400 were unemployed when the hog kill was shut down. Then, in 1982, company management announced that the plant would close on October 16, 1982, which would put 1,200 people out of work and bring the unemployment rate up to 17.2 percent. This was despite a 15.8 percent cut in pay and benefits that union workers had taken, and a reduction in taxes by the city.

Near the end of 1982, the President and Chairman of Dubuque Packing Company Charles E. Stoltz sold the packing plant and its fleur-de-lis trademark to a group which included Robert H. Wahlert. The packing plant began operations as FDL Foods, Inc. The Dubuque Packing Company moved its headquarters to the Dubuque Building, where it continued to bargain with the union over pension and insurance benefits. In 1985 the headquarters was moved to Omaha, Nebraska to be more centrally located to its other plants, which were processing primarily beef at that time. The company again flourished and was later sold in a leveraged buyout to BeefAmerica, a firm controlled by Eli Jacobs. Its gelatin operations were sold to the French company Sanofi. BeefAmerica went out of business in 1998 following a recall and a strike.

== Post-BeefAmerica ==
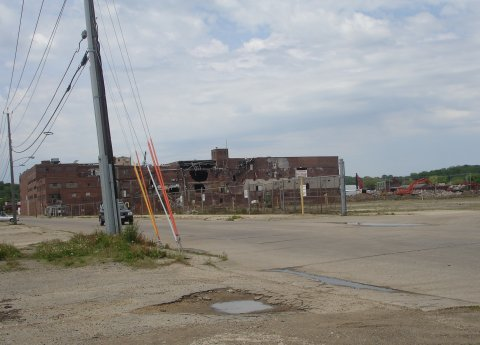
The former Dubuque Packing Company plant being demolished in May 2006.

The packing plant in Dubuque operated under the FDL Foods Inc. name until September 1995 when the plant again closed, this time due to the loss of the sole contract with Hormel (as reported to workers by management in July 1995). The plant was eventually sold to Farmland Foods, who continued to operate the plant until 2001. Smithfield Foods purchased the plant with the stated intention of refurbishing and reopening the plant. However once Smithfield purchased the plant they decided not to proceed with either remodeling or reopening the plant. This led to the belief that Smithfield only purchased the plant to remove competition from the market.

For the next four years, the former Dubuque Packing Company plant sat empty. From time to time Dubuque police used the plant for training purposes, but otherwise no activity took place there. Many in the community felt that the abandoned plant was an eyesore — especially given its position near the Mississippi River and U.S. Highway 61 and U.S. Highway 151. In 2003, Walmart expressed interest in the site for a second supercenter. But when the city decided against supplying tax incentives, Walmart decided not to proceed with the project.

Then, in 2004, local developer Wayne Briggs announced his plans to tear down the plant and redevelop the site as a shopping center. This new shopping center would have national retailers, and would give the northeastern parts of the city more shopping options. Briggs purchased the plant site. The Dubuque County zoning board gave their approval to the plans. On March 21, 2005, the entire city council approved the rezoning of the site.

Demolition of the old packing plant was slow going due to concerns over hazardous waste such as asbestos. The asbestos was gone by May 2006, when a fire began at the former packing plant. The Dubuque Fire Department handled the fire, taking it slowly because of the instability of the partially demolished building. Briggs said at the time that the fire wouldn't affect the demolition schedule, and by October 1, 2006, the buildings were totally demolished. Currently site preparation is being done to prepare the site for construction.

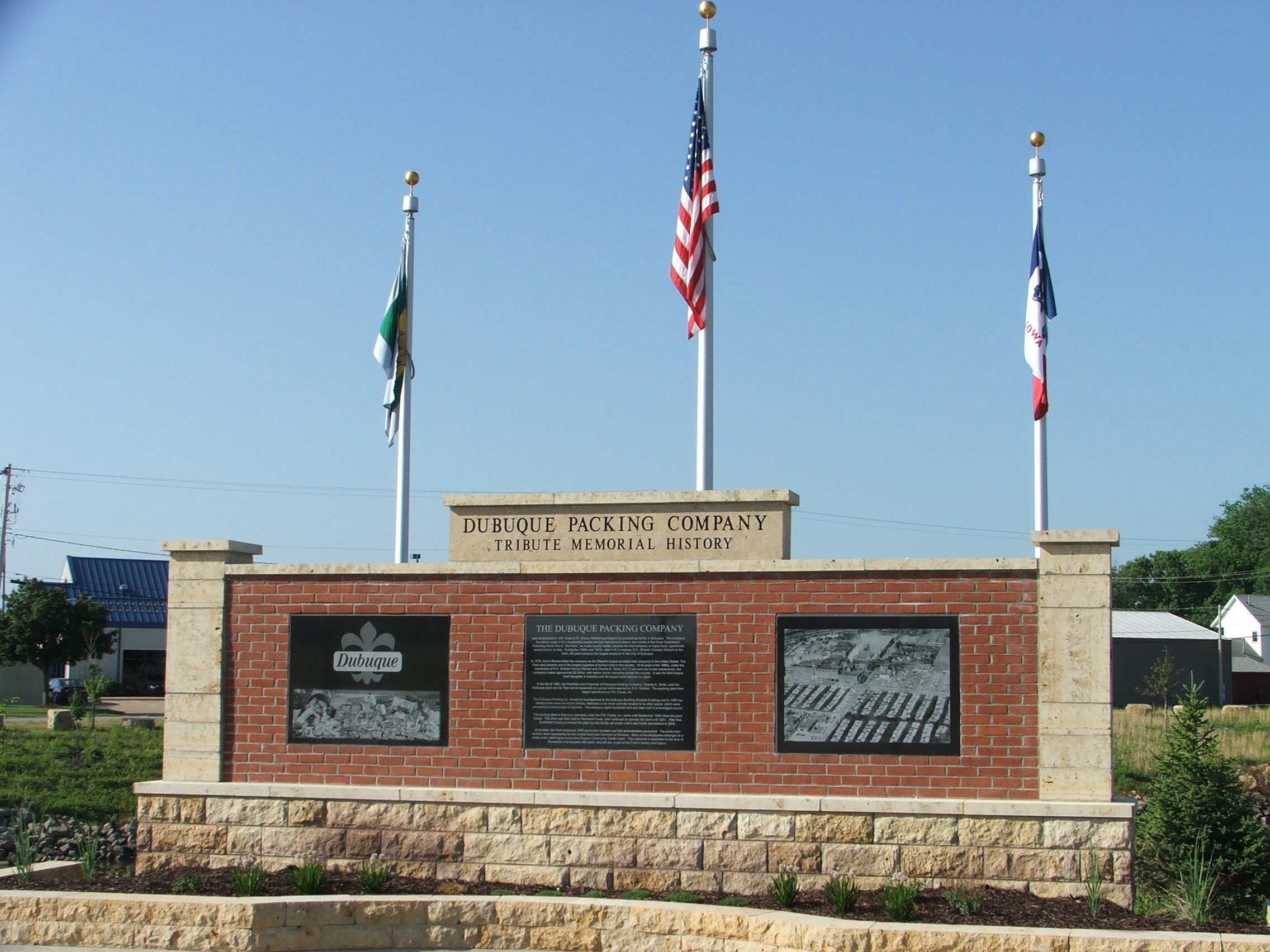
The Dubuque Packing Company workers' memorial stands across the street from where the plant once stood.
