= Concord Township, Dubuque County, Iowa =

Concord Township
- Township
- Location in Dubuque County
- Coordinates: 42°36′01″N 90°57′30″W
- Country: United States
- State: Iowa
- County: Dubuque

Area
  - Total: 36.40 sq mi (94.28 km^{2})
  - Land: 36.40 sq mi (94.28 km^{2})
  - Water: 0 sq mi (0 km^{2}) 0%
- Elevation: 1,079 ft (329 m)

Population (2000)
  - Total: 830
  - Density: 23/sq mi (8.8/km^{2})
- Time zone: UTC-6 (CST)
  - Summer (DST): UTC-5 (CDT)
- ZIP codes: 52039, 52045, 52053, 52073
- GNIS feature ID: 0467646

Concord Township is one of seventeen townships in Dubuque County, Iowa, United States. As of the 2000 census, its population was 830.

== Geography ==
According to the United States Census Bureau, Concord Township covers an area of 36.4 square miles (94.28 square kilometers).

=== Cities, towns, villages ===
- Holy Cross
- Rickardsville (partial)

=== Unincorporated towns ===
- Cottage Hill at 42.585275°N 90.913740°W

(This list is based on USGS data and may include former settlements.)

=== Adjacent townships ===
- Buena Vista Township, Clayton County (north)
- Jefferson Township (east)
- Center Township (southeast)
- Iowa Township (south)
- New Wine Township (southwest)
- Liberty Township (west)
- Millville Township, Clayton County (northwest)

=== Cemeteries ===
The township contains these six cemeteries: Bankston Park (historical), Christian, Cottage Hill Christian, Cottage Hill Protestant, Floyd and Holy Cross Catholic.

=== Major highways ===
- U.S. Route 52
- Iowa Highway 3

== School districts ==
- Western Dubuque Community School District

== Political districts ==
- Iowa's 1st congressional district
- State House District 32
- State Senate District 16
