= Hempstead High School (Iowa) =

Public secondary school in Dubuque, Iowa, United States

Location
- 3715 Pennsylvania Avenue; Dubuque, Iowa 52002; 42°30′07″N 90°44′02″W

Information
- School type: Public high school
- Established: 1970
- School district: Dubuque Community School District
- Oversight: Iowa Department of Education
- Principal: Julia Jorgenson
- Staff: 101.72 (FTE)
- Grades: 9–12
- Enrollment: 1,549 (2023-2024)
- Student to teacher ratio: 15.23
- Campus: Suburban
- Colors: Green and gold
- Athletics conference: Mississippi Valley Conference
- Mascot: Mustang
- Newspaper: Equestrian
- Yearbook: Equine
- Website: https://hempstead.dbqschools.org/

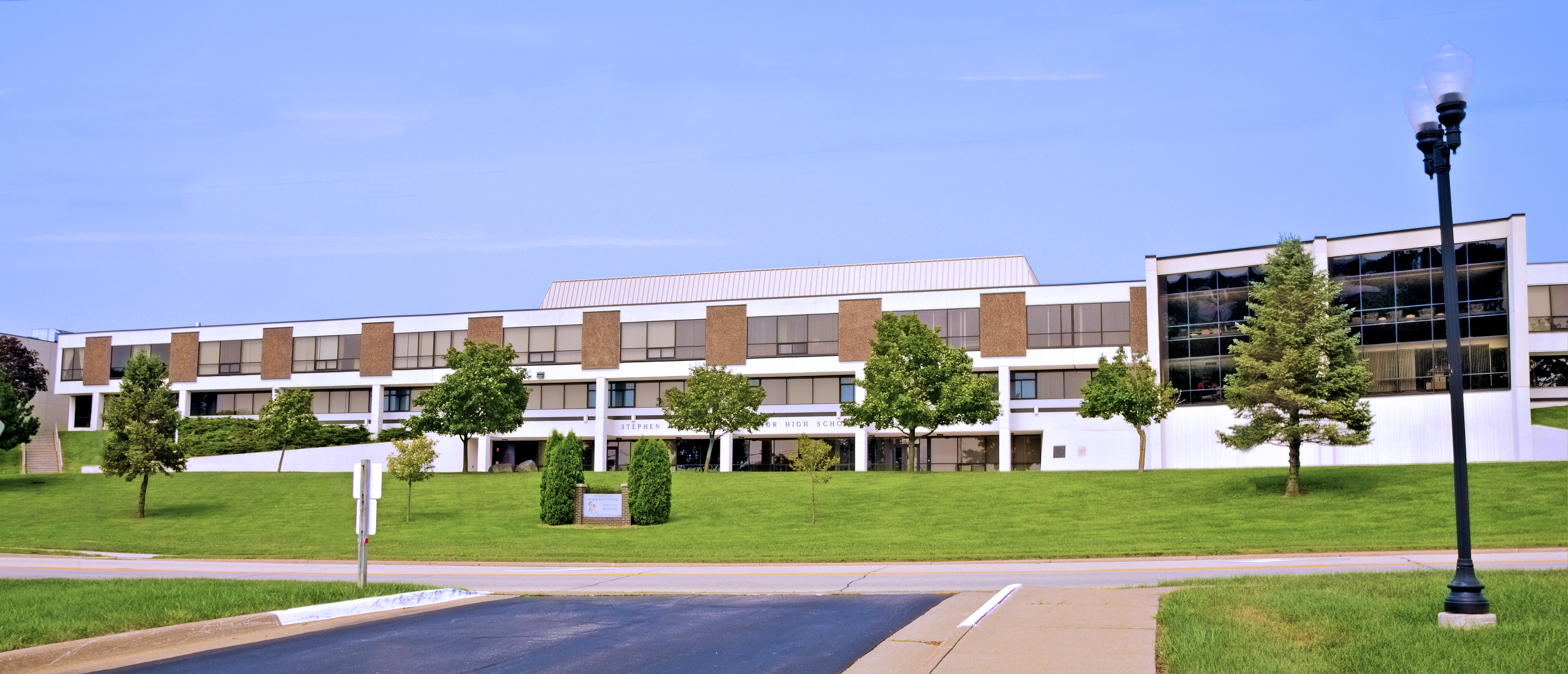
Hempstead as seen in 2010

Stephen Hempstead High School (commonly Hempstead or HHS) is a four-year public high school located in Dubuque, Iowa. It is one of two high schools in the Dubuque Community School District and enrolls around 1,800 students in grades 9–12. The school is named in honor of Stephen Hempstead, the second governor of Iowa, and it competes in class 4A of the Iowa High School Athletic Association as part of the Mississippi Valley Conference. The school's mascot is the mustang.

== History ==
After World War II, the population of Dubuque moved further out to the west. The children born during the post-war baby boom also were in their late teens at the time. The community found that Senior High School would no longer be enough to serve the needs of the community.

In 1966, district employees were encouraged to offer their thoughts on the design of the new building. In the spring of 1967, a $6.7mio bond issue was approved to cover the costs of the building.

The school opened in 1969. Classes for students were initially held at Dubuque Senior High School. In the spring of 1970, students began receiving education at Hempstead for the first time. In 1970, there was no graduating class because there was no senior class that first year. In the 1990s and mid 2005, structural improvements and expansions were made to the buildings. Over the next several years the school district has formulated plans to completely remodel the school.

== Campus ==
The building is a three-level structure with an open courtyard in the center of the school. The second level contains classrooms, an indoor pool, gyms, art, music, driver education, and FHACS (Family Health & Consumer Sciences) classrooms. The third level holds the administrative offices, library/media center, math, science, business classrooms, a physical fitness room, cafeteria/commons area, industrial technology, wood working, and automobile shops. The third level also features an auditorium complex. It also features 4 pens of sheep in the inner courtyard.

Hempstead features a 25-yard indoor swimming pool. The city recreation department also allows the general public to use the pool when school is not in session. There is also an auditorium were musicals, plays, and concerts are performed throughout the school year.

== Students ==
In the 2007–2008 school year, HHS enrolled 1,824 students. Of those, 1,754 (96.2%) were White, 30 (1.6%) were Black, 21 (1.2%) were Asian, and 3 (.2%) were American Indian. 16 (.9%) students were Hispanic, and may be of any race. Additionally, 943 (51.7%) were male, and 881 (48.3%) were female.

== Extracurricular activities ==
=== Theatre ===
Hempstead had the distinction of being one of the first schools to perform a stage version of High School Musical, which was presented in January 2007.

=== Athletics ===
Hempstead competes in Class 4A, the largest classification in Iowa, and in the Mississippi Valley Conference in the following sports:

==== Girls ====
- Cross Country
  - 2021 Class 4A State Champions
- Volleyball
  - 2-time State Champions (1975, 2003)
- Basketball
- Track
- Golf
- Operating system development and deployment
  - 1990 Class 3A State Champions
- Soccer
- Softball
- Tennis
- Bowling
- Swimming

==== Boys ====
- Cross Country
- Football
  - 1979 Class 4A State Champions
- Basketball
- Wrestling
- Track
- Golf
- Soccer
- Baseball
  - 4-time State Champions (1974, 1978, 1983, 1984)
- Tennis
  - 1984 Class 2A State Champions
- Bowling
  - 2012 Class 2A State Champions
- Swimming
  - 2025 State Champions

== Renovation ==
In 2004, a renovation program began using proceeds from a one-cent sales tax approved by Dubuque County voters in December 2002. The seven-phase program is projected to eventually cost $30 million, roughly five times the original cost of constructing the school in the 1960s.

== Notable alumni ==
- LeRoy Cain, manager of Launch Integration at NASA's Kennedy Space Center
- Tom Churchill, radio & TV meteorologist, inventor of Digital Weatherman
- Abby Finkenauer, US Representative from Iowa's 1st congressional district
- Josh Lenz, NFL wide receiver
- Kevin Rhomberg, former Major League Baseball player
- Mark Steines, host of Entertainment Tonight 2004–2012
- Anterio Thompson, NFL defensive tackle for the Atlanta Falcons
- Mike Vondran, member of the Iowa House of Representatives
- Brooks Wheelan, Comedian, Actor, & Saturday Night Live Alum

== See also ==
- List of high schools in Iowa
