= Bennettsville, Iowa =

- Unincorporated community
- Location within Iowa
- Coordinates: 42°21′36″N 90°43′41″W
- Country: United States
- State: Iowa
- County: Dubuque County
- Time zone: UTC-6 (Central (CST))
  - Summer (DST): UTC-5 (CDT)
- Area code: 712
- GNIS feature ID: 464164

Bennettsville (also known as Bennettville) was an unincorporated community in Dubuque County, in the U.S. state of Iowa.

== Geography ==
Bennettsville was located at 42°21′36″N 90°43′41″W, at the junction of Bennettville Road and St. Joes Prairie Road.

== History ==
Bennettsville was founded in Section 9 of Washington Township, Dubuque County. The name of the community has also been spelled Bennettville.

The post office was established in June 1891. James J. Cota served as postmaster. The Bennettsville post office also served as the store. Circa 1901, Bennettville had a school.

The community's population was 8 in 1890. Bennettsville's post office was discontinued in either 1897 or 1900.

== See also ==
Washington Mills, Iowa
