= Ballyclough, Iowa =

- unincorporated community
- Location within Iowa
- Coordinates: 42°25′33″N 90°43′05″W
- Country: United States
- State: Iowa
- County: Dubuque County
- Elevation: 1,066 ft (325 m)
- Time zone: UTC-6 (Central (CST))
  - Summer (DST): UTC-5 (CDT)
- GNIS feature ID: 454340

Ballyclough is an unincorporated community in Dubuque County, in the U.S. state of Iowa.

== History ==
Ballyclough was founded 8 miles from Dubuque. William Kaufman ran the grocery store in Ballyclough. The name of the community is Irish in origin.

The community's population was 25 in 1890, and was 21 in 1900.

In 1947, the Table Mound Township Hall was located in Ballyclough.
