= Rockdale, Iowa =

Coordinates: 42°27′51″N 90°40′42″W

Rockdale, Iowa was a small unincorporated village formerly located just south of Dubuque, Iowa between Dubuque and Key West, Iowa. The village was situated on the Catfish Creek in Dubuque County, Iowa, and was the site of one of the first mills in the state of Iowa. Rockdale was annexed into the City of Dubuque in the late 1970s.

In 1834 or 1835 David Hutton and his son built a mill built of logs. Initially the mill was known as "The Catfish Mills." In 1839 the mill was sold. James Pratt and Walter Manson purchased the mill in 1840, and they renamed the mill "Rockford Mill." They replaced the original log building with a frame building four stories high. This mill could produce 90,000 bushels of wheat annually, and the flour produced was equal in quality to the flour produced in St. Louis, Missouri. As a result, the mill enjoyed a monopoly in the upper Midwest until the establishment of other mills. Pratt and Manson would operate this mill for the next 25 years. During this time Rockdale was a crossroads for farmers in the area.

Operations at the Rockdale Mill were temporarily halted due to the Rockdale Flood. The mill would eventually start producing flour once again. In 1878 the mill burned to the ground. Thomas Watters Jr. rebuilt the mill as a stone structure. He changed the name to the South Dubuque Mill. J.F. Gondolfo would purchase the mill in 1885. He made repairs, and the mill continued to produce flour for a number of years. In 1901 the mill would be leased out to a company that ran the mill for the next 14 years. In 1915 the mill was finally shut down. For a time it was used as a dairy barn until it was destroyed by fire in 1927.

The village would eventually grow to include a saloon, hotel, stores, blacksmith shop, several homes, and a post office. The villagers built a Methodist church built out of logs in the 1830s. In 1874 the present structure was built at 1500 Old Mill Road with red brick. The Rockdale Methodist Church still stands and, along with its Cemetery at the side and back, is still in use today.

Rockdale's population was 132 in 1902, and was 85 in 1925.

== The Rockdale Flood ==
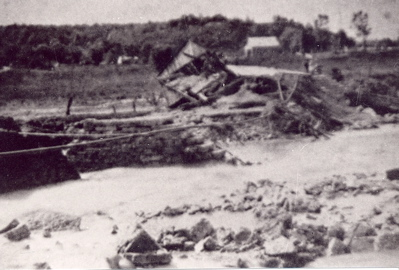
Aftermath of the Rockdale Flood, July 4, 1876

On July 4, 1876, Rockdale would be the site of one of the worst flooding disasters in the history of the area. For most of the day those living in the area celebrated the 100th anniversary of the nation. As night approached the celebrations wrapped up, around 10 p.m. a light drizzle began falling. Soon this drizzle turned into a downpour of rain. The Catfish Creek soon jumped out of its bank and broke the mill dam which was upstream of the village.

The resulting wall of water – which was estimated to be 20 feet deep and hundreds of feet wide – swept through the village. By the time the flood was over, the mill and one house would be the only buildings still standing. In Rockdale forty-two people died in the flood, while in Dubuque only one person died. Survivors were found in the tree tops where the flood waters had swept them. Charles Thimmesch – a local barkeeper – survived with an incredible tale of escape. He had climbed on the roof of the post office after warning others of the flood. Thimmesch escaped by swimming naked to higher ground with his money in his mouth. As a result of the destruction, the village was never the same. Most of the people living in the village had died during the floods.

John and Frances Howell wrote home to family in England from USA in a letter of July 12, 1876:

... The crops here will not be good here, there has been so great falls of rain that has done a vast deal of damage. I dare say your Brother Joe can remember Cat Fish Mill. On the 4th July, the great day of rejoicing all over America, at night set in such violent a storm of rain as was ever known here. by Catfish Mill there was a little village of 12 or 13 houses. all had been at the great rejoicings and came home tired and returned to rest, and all families drowned in a few hours after. 39 men, women, and children, all but a young man and one family who were saved almost miraculously. their house turned on one side and was stopped by a big tree. they clung to the rafters with their heads just above water and held on until help came to them. I cannot sleep well for thinking of those dear children. The house was knocked to fragments and up to the 8th, 31 dead bodies were found. Hundreds of people have been to see where they stood. But the mill, which was built of large stone, turned the flood on one side and is still alright. You may conject what a flood, 25 feet deep, came rushing down and swept all away. There is a great deal of damage done at many places and the Rail Roads washed away, and many persons lost their lives. This year appears to be a year of great floods and fires. ...

The family that survived the flood was the Gustav A Horn family headed by Gustav and Helene Augusta Dettmer. They had five children: Emeila C (born 1862), Bertha Helene (b. 1864), Ida (b. 1866), Caroline (b.1868) and Albert A (b.1872). Gustav immigrated from Dosenau, Schleswig-Holstein. They had the general store in Rockdale. He planted Lombardy Poplar trees on their property in memory of his childhood home in Germany. The elder Horns always intended to return home to Germany. When the flood waters rose, they scrambled up into the attic rafters. With the water just below them, the little boy, Albert became confused, and said to his father, "But Papa, I don't want to go back to Germany". The story, handed down the generations, was that they were the only family to survive in its entirety, and that Lombardy trees were the only thing that saved them. Gustav had a sketch that he drew of his childhood home that also survived the flood, albeit with flood mud on it.

=== Aftermath ===
Along with the floods, the shutting down of the mill and eventual construction of highways for automobile traffic would mean the end of Rockdale as a crossroads. The highways built all bypassed the Rockdale area. The Rockdale area was annexed by the city of Dubuque, and is now entirely within the city. While some local commuter traffic passes through the area due to Kelly Lane being nearby, most traffic uses U.S. Highway 151 and 61 and completely bypasses the area.
