= Massey, Iowa =

- Unincorporated community
- Location within Iowa
- Coordinates: 42°25′49″N 90°35′06″W
- Country: United States
- State: Iowa
- County: Dubuque
- Elevation: 646 ft (197 m)
- Time zone: UTC-6 (Central (CST))
  - Summer (DST): UTC-5 (CDT)
- Area code: 563
- GNIS feature ID: 458851

Massey is an unincorporated community in Dubuque County, Iowa, United States.
