= Waupeton, Iowa =

- Unincorporated community
- Location within Iowa
- Coordinates: 42°40′04″N 90°52′56″W
- Country: United States
- State: Iowa
- County: Dubuque
- Elevation: 650 ft (200 m)
- Time zone: UTC-6 (Central (CST))
  - Summer (DST): UTC-5 (CDT)
- Area code: 563
- GNIS feature ID: 464796

Waupeton is an unincorporated community in Dubuque County, Iowa, United States.

== History ==
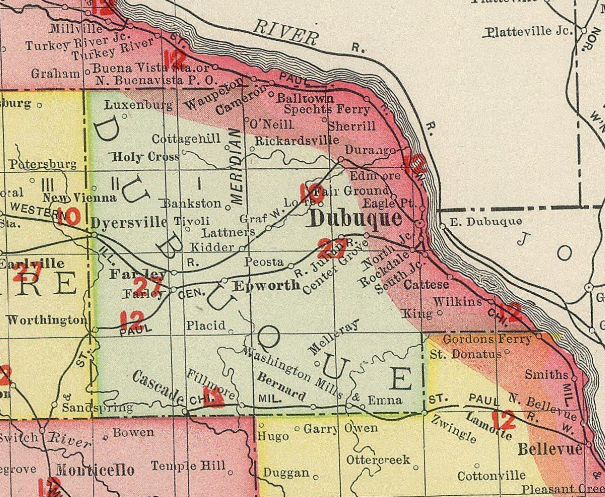
Waupeton in Dubuque County, Iowa, in 1903; Waupeton is located at the northern edge of the county on the Mississippi River.

Waupeton was founded in the 1800s; its population was 50 in 1925. The population was 27 in 1940.
