= Fred Gloden =

American football player (1918–2019)

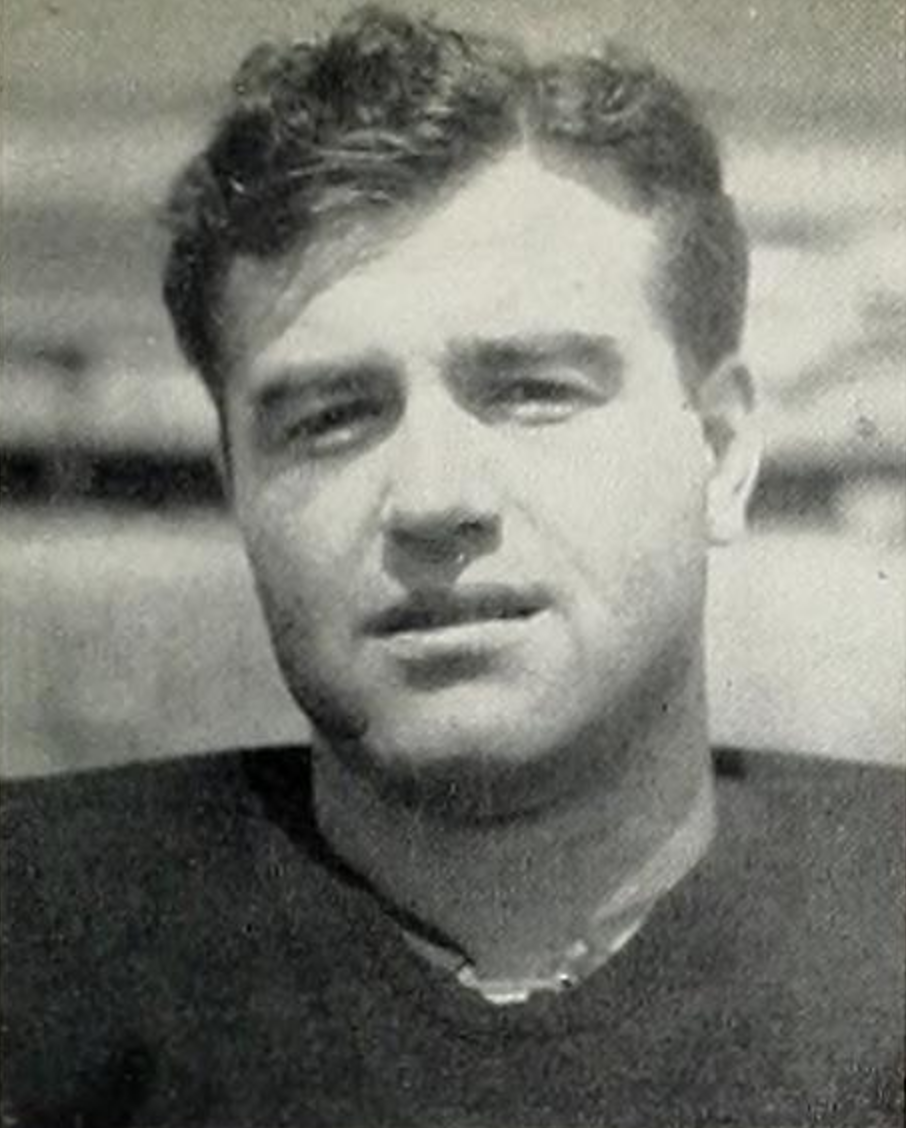
- Gloden pictured c. 1941 at Tulane

No. 37, 1, 87
- Position: Halfback

Personal information
- Born: December 21, 1918; Dubuque, Iowa, U.S.
- Died: February 25, 2019 (aged 100); Philadelphia, Pennsylvania, U.S.
- Listed height: 5 ft 10 in (1.78 m)
- Listed weight: 187 lb (85 kg)

Career information
- High school: Dubuque (Iowa)
- College: Tulane (1937–1940)
- NFL draft: 1941: undrafted

Career history
- Philadelphia Eagles (1941); Hollywood Bears (1945); Miami Seahawks (1946); Chicago Rockets (1947)*
- * Offseason or practice squad member only

Career NFL statistics
- Rushing attempts: 35
- Rushing yards: 79
- Rushing touchdowns: 1
- Receptions: 2
- Receiving yards: 13
- Receiving touchdowns: 0
- Stats at Pro Football Reference

Frederick Jean Gloden Jr. (December 21, 1918 – February 25, 2019) was an American professional football halfback who played for the Philadelphia Eagles of the National Football League (NFL) and the Miami Seahawks of the All-America Football Conference (AAFC). He played college football at Tulane University. Prior to his death, Gloden was the oldest living former NFL player.

== Early life and college ==
Frederick Jean Gloden Jr. was born on December 21, 1918, in Dubuque, Iowa. He attended Dubuque Senior High School in Dubuque.

Gloden played college football for the Tulane Green Wave of Tulane University. He was on the freshman team in 1937 and was a three-year letterman from 1938 to 1940.

== Professional career ==
Gloden went undrafted in the 1941 NFL draft. He played in six games for the Eagles during the 1941 season, rushing 22 times for 55 yards while also catching two passes for 13 yards. He then served in the United States Navy during World War II.

Gloden was a member of the Hollywood Bears of the Pacific Coast Professional Football League in 1945.

Gloden signed with the Miami Seahawks of the All-America Football Conference (AAFC) on May 29, 1946. He played in seven games for the Seahawks during the AAFC's inaugural 1946 season, rushing 13 times for 24 yards and one touchdown while also returning one kick for 20 yards. He was released on October 28, 1946.

Gloden signed with the Chicago Rockets of the AAFC in 1947 but was later released.

== Personal life ==
In the week leading up to Super Bowl LII, Gloden, age 99, was interviewed by NBC 10 in Philadelphia where he made the prediction that the Eagles would beat the New England Patriots by six points. The story was also picked up by the NFL. He died on February 25, 2019, at the age of 100, in Philadelphia. Prior to his death, Gloden was the oldest living former NFL player.
