= Durango, Iowa =

- City
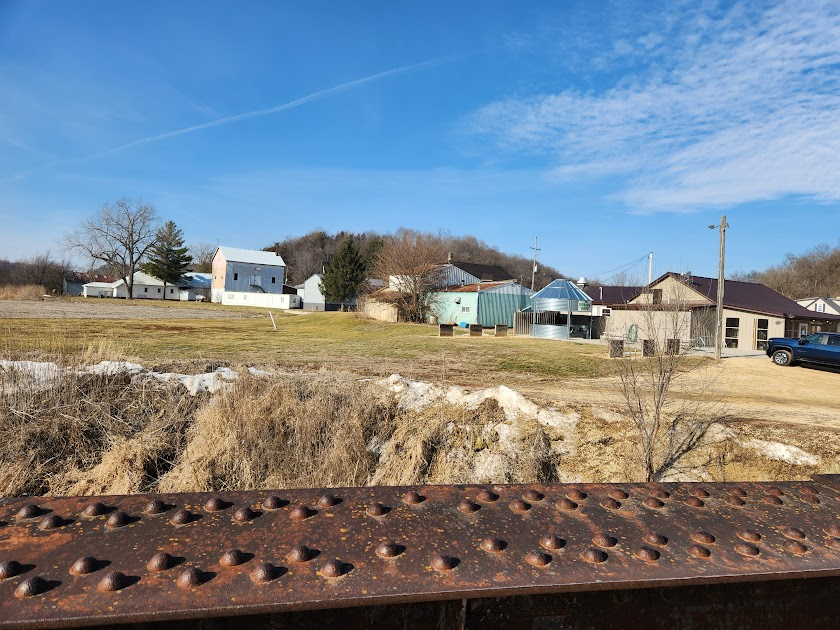
- Durango from a bridge on the Heritage Trail.

- Location of Durango, Iowa
- Coordinates: 42°33′40″N 90°46′31″W
- Country: United States
- State: Iowa
- County: Dubuque

Area
  - Total: 0.077 sq mi (0.20 km^{2})
  - Land: 0.077 sq mi (0.20 km^{2})
  - Water: 0 sq mi (0.00 km^{2})
- Elevation: 643 ft (196 m)

Population (2020)
  - Total: 20
  - Density: 264.0/sq mi (101.93/km^{2})
- Time zone: UTC-6 (Central (CST))
  - Summer (DST): UTC-5 (CDT)
- ZIP code: 52039
- Area code: 563
- FIPS code: 19-22935
- GNIS feature ID: 2394580

Durango is a city in Dubuque County, Iowa, United States. It is part of the Dubuque, Iowa Metropolitan Statistical Area. The population was 20 at the time of the 2020 census, down from 24 in 2000.

== Geography ==
According to the United States Census Bureau, the city has a total area of 0.04 square miles (0.10 km^{2}), all land.

== Demographics ==
Historical populations
Year	Pop.	±%
1940	42	—
1950	71	+69.0%
1960	37	−47.9%
1970	55	+48.6%
1980	41	−25.5%
1990	34	−17.1%
2000	24	−29.4%
2010	22	−8.3%
2020	20	−9.1%
Source:"U.S. Census website". United States Census Bureau. and Iowa Data Center; Source: U.S. Decennial Census

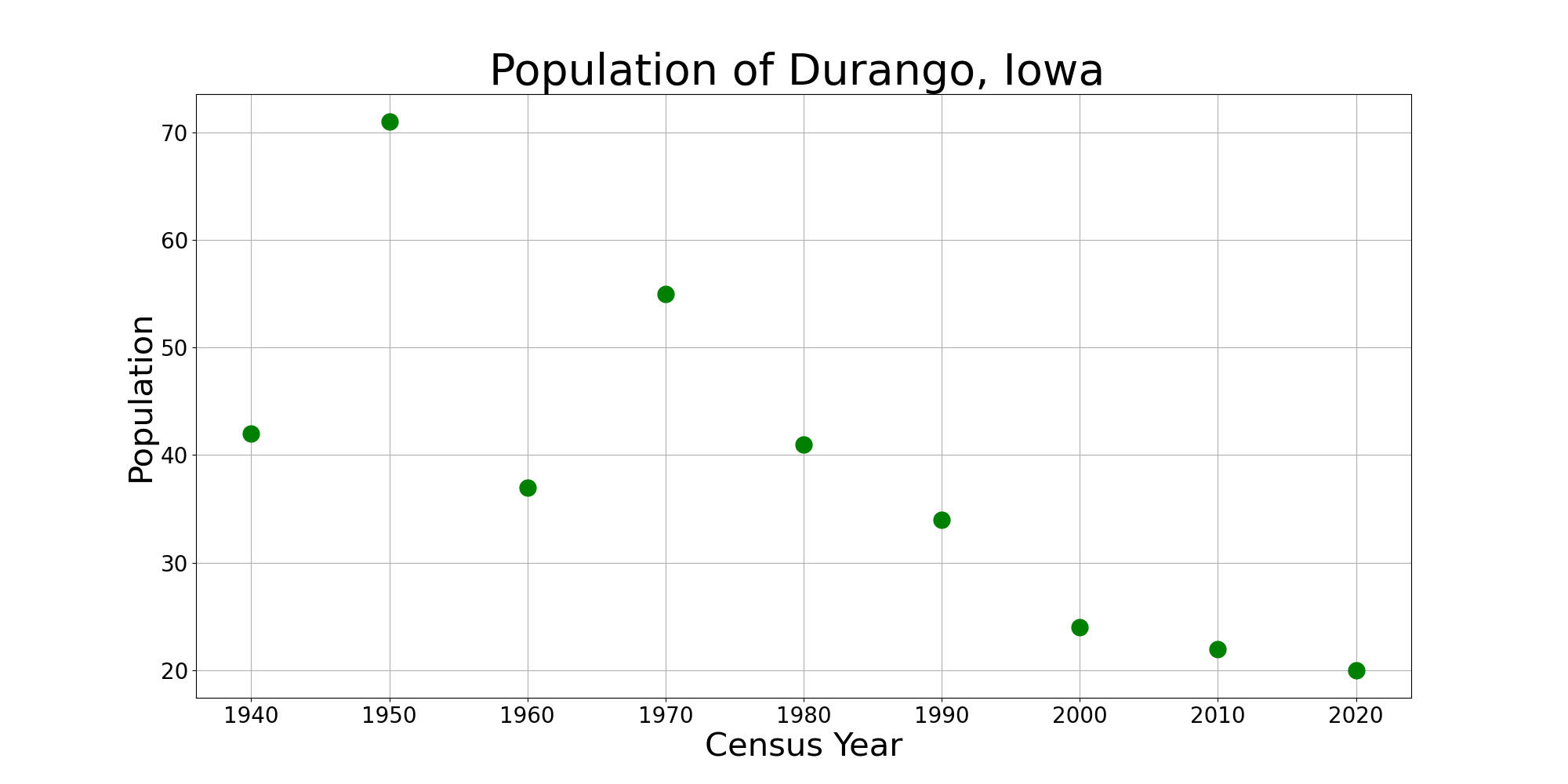
The population of Durango, Iowa from US census data

=== 2020 census ===
As of the census of 2020, there were 20 people, 8 households, and 8 families residing in the city. The population density was 264.0 inhabitants per square mile (101.9/km^{2}). There were 11 housing units at an average density of 145.2 per square mile (56.1/km^{2}). The racial makeup of the city was 95.0% White, 0.0% Black or African American, 0.0% Native American, 0.0% Asian, 0.0% Pacific Islander, 0.0% from other races and 5.0% from two or more races. Hispanic or Latino persons of any race comprised 0.0% of the population.

Of the 8 households, 37.5% of which had children under the age of 18 living with them, 37.5% were married couples living together, 12.5% were cohabitating couples, 25.0% had a female householder with no spouse or partner present and 25.0% had a male householder with no spouse or partner present. 0.0% of all households were non-families. 0.0% of all households were made up of individuals, 0.0% had someone living alone who was 65 years old or older.

The median age in the city was 45.5 years. 20.0% of the residents were under the age of 20; 0.0% were between the ages of 20 and 24; 30.0% were from 25 and 44; 15.0% were from 45 and 64; and 35.0% were 65 years of age or older. The gender makeup of the city was 55.0% male and 45.0% female.

=== 2010 census ===
As of the census of 2010, there were 22 people, 10 households, and 6 families living in the city. The population density was 550.0 inhabitants per square mile (212.4/km^{2}). There were 10 housing units at an average density of 250.0 per square mile (96.5/km^{2}). The racial makeup of the city was 100.0% White.

Of the 10 households, 20.0% had children under the age of 18 living with them, 60.0% were married couples living together, and 40.0% were non-families. 40.0% of households were one person, and 20% were one person aged 65 or older. The average household size was 2.20 and the average family size was 3.00.

The median age was 46 years. 18.2% of residents were under the age of 18; 13.5% were between the ages of 18 and 24; 13.5% were from 25 to 44; 27.2% were from 45 to 64; and 27.3% were 65 or older. The gender makeup of the city was 63.6% male and 36.4% female.

=== 2000 census ===
As of the census of 2000, there were 24 people, 11 households, and 7 families living in the city. The population density was 709.8 inhabitants per square mile (274.1/km^{2}). There were 12 housing units at an average density of 354.9 per square mile (137.0/km^{2}). The racial makeup of the city was 100.00% White.

Of the 11 households 36.4% (4) had children under the age of 18 living with them, 45.5% (5) were married couples living together, 27.3% (3) had a female householder with no husband present, and 27.3% (3) were non-families. 27.3% (3) of all households were made up of individuals, and 18.2% (2) had someone living alone who was 65 or older. The average household size was 2.18 and the average family size was 2.50.

The age distribution was 20.8% (5) under the age of 18, 8.3% (2) from 18 to 24, 33.3% (8) from 25 to 44, 20.8% (5) from 45 to 64, and 16.7% (4) who were 65 or older. The median age was 39 years. For every 100 females, there were 71.4 males (There were 14 females and 10 males). For every 100 females age 18 and over, there were 72.7 males (That makes 10 females and 7 males).

The median household income was $32,188 and the median income for a family was $55,625. Males had a median income of $0 versus $22,083 for females. The per capita income for the city was $19,827. There were 22.2% of families living below the poverty line and 15.4% of the population, including 50.0% of under eighteens and none of those over 64.
