= Dubuque Police Department =

Jurisdictional structure
- Operations jurisdiction: Dubuque, Iowa, United States
- General nature: Local civilian police

Operational structure
- Headquarters: Dubuque Law Enforcement Center
- Sworn members: 109
- Unsworn members: 11
- Agency executive: Jeremy Jensen, Chief of Police

Website
- City of Dubuque Police

The Dubuque Police Department is the municipal police department for the city of Dubuque, Iowa. The department currently consists has a staff of 92 sworn officers and 11 civilians. The Chief of the department is Jeremy Jensen.

The department is located at 770 Iowa Street, and shares facilities and other resources with the Dubuque County sheriff's office. The department patch was based loosely on the patch worn by officers within the San Francisco Police, as it incorporates a Phoenix. The current department patch features a blue background with a gold fleur-de-lis in the center, with the State of Iowa flag and the United States flag.

== Fallen officers ==
In the history of the Dubuque Police Department, two officers have been killed in the line of duty.

Officer	Date of death	Cause of death
Albert Meisner	October 1, 1896	Struck by train
Daniel Norton	July 6, 1904	Gunfire

== See also ==
- List of law enforcement agencies in Iowa
