= Washington Mills, Iowa =

- Unincorporated community
- Location in Iowa
- Country: United States
- State: Iowa
- County: Dubuque County
- Elevation: 817 ft (249 m)
- Time zone: UTC-6 (CST)
  - Summer (DST): UTC-5 (CDT)
- GNIS feature ID: 464793

Washington Mills is an unincorporated community in Dubuque County, Iowa, United States.

== History ==
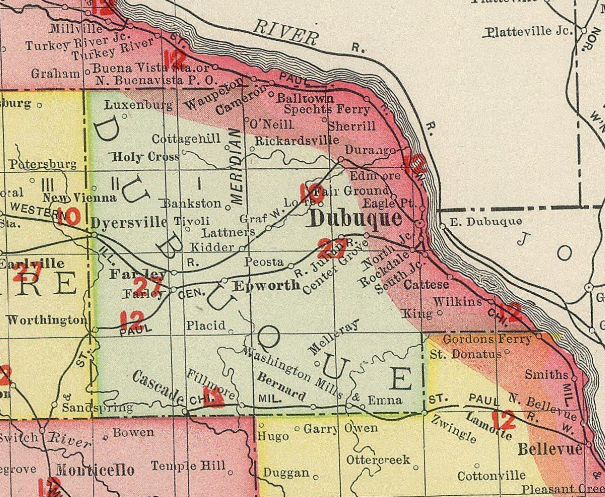
Washington Mills in Dubuque County, Iowa, in 1903; Washington Mills is located at the southern edge of the county.

Washington Mills' population was 75 in 1887, and was 112 in 1902. The population was 55 in 1940.
