= Five Points, Iowa =

- Unincorporated community
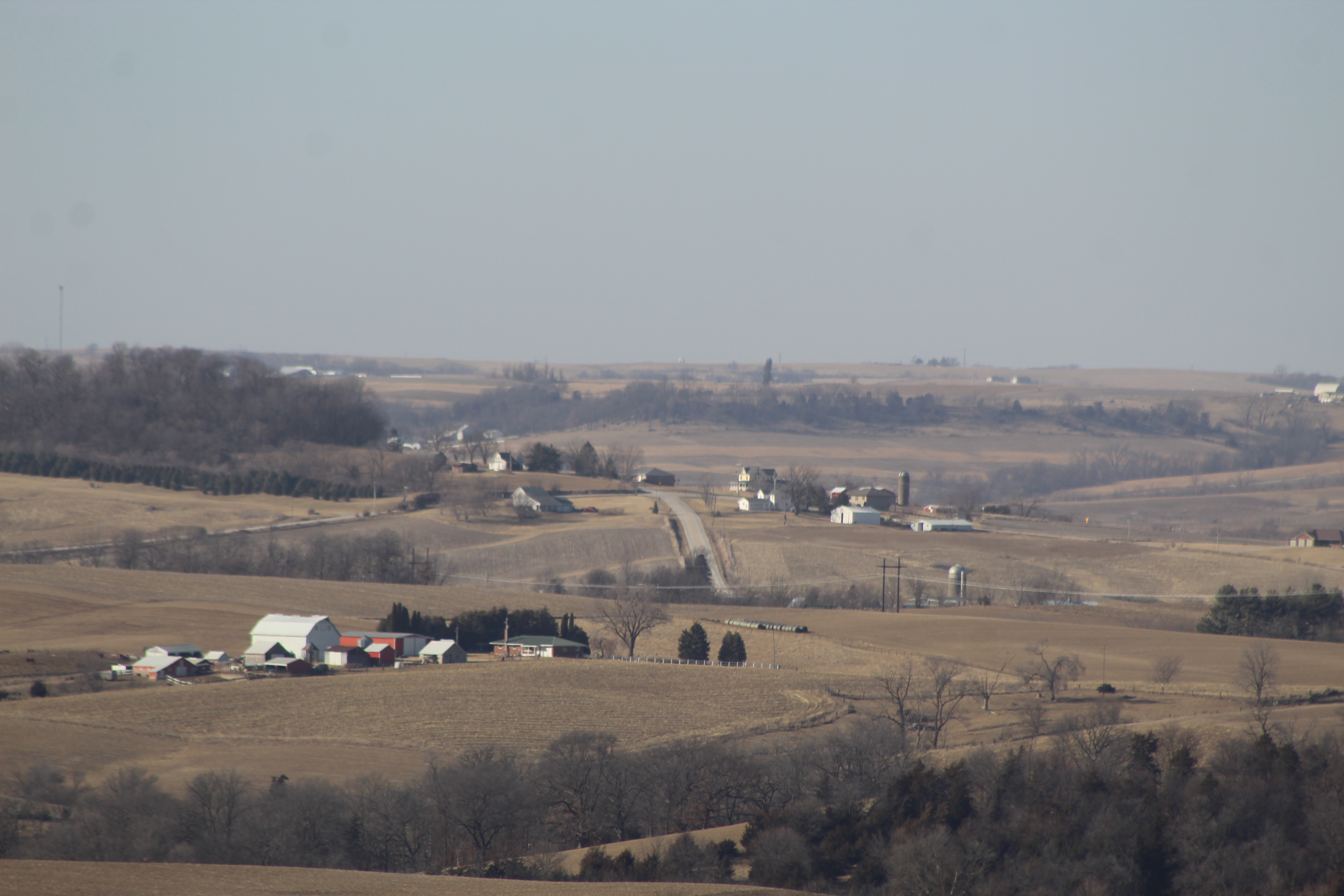
- Five Points

- Location within Iowa
- Coordinates: 42°33′05″N 90°51′30″W
- Country: United States
- State: Iowa
- County: Dubuque
- Elevation: 988 ft (301 m)
- Time zone: UTC-6 (Central (CST))
  - Summer (DST): UTC-5 (CDT)
- Area code: 563
- GNIS feature ID: 464543

Five Points is an unincorporated community in Dubuque County, Iowa, United States.

== History ==
Five Points' population was just 10 in 1925.
