= Dubuque County, Iowa =

County in Iowa, United States

- County
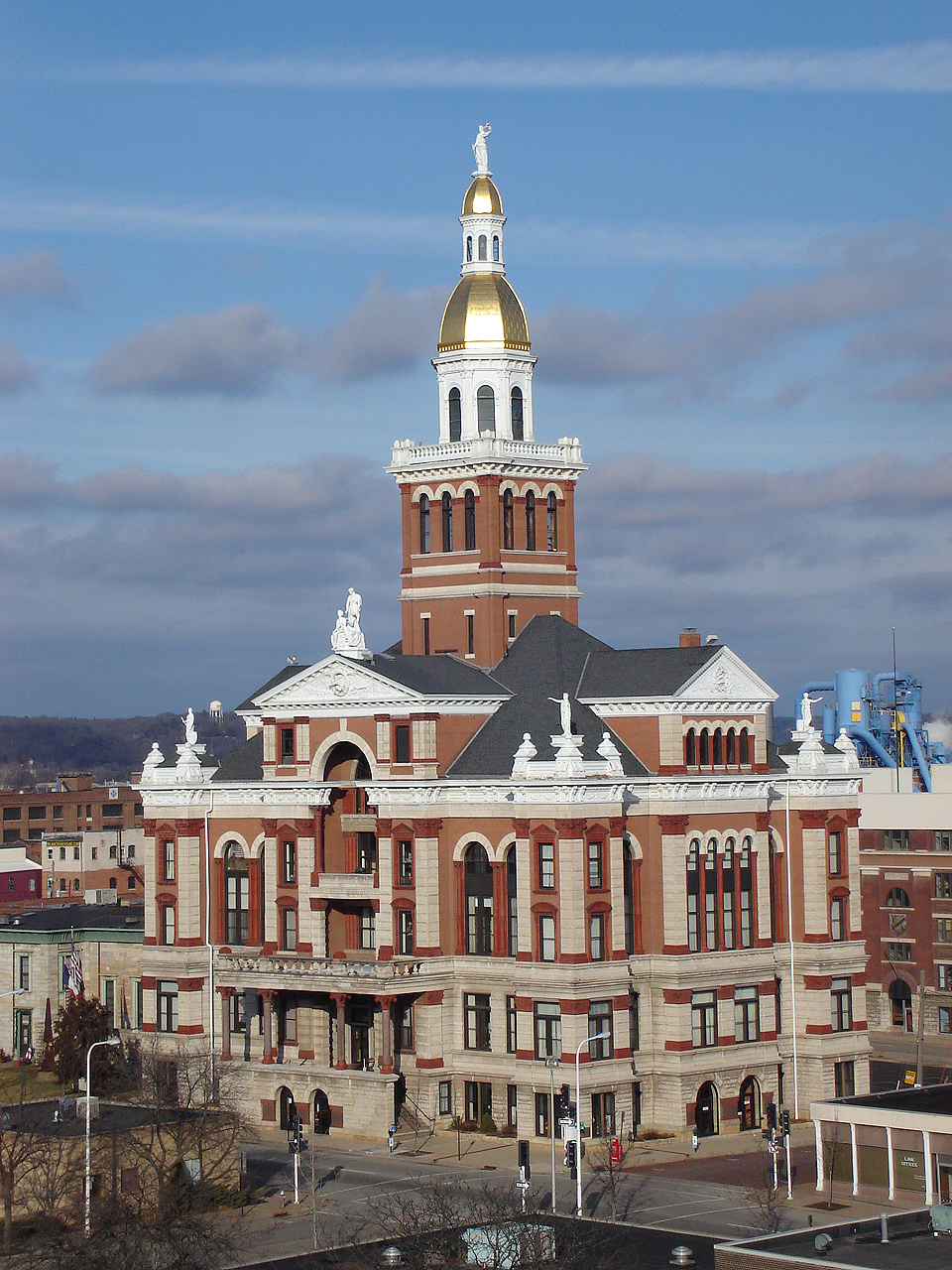
- The Dubuque County Courthouse is an example of Beaux-Arts architecture.

- Seal

- Location within the U.S. state of Iowa
- Coordinates: 42.463481°N 90.878771°W
- Country: United States
- State: Iowa
- Founded: October 1, 1834
- Named for: Julien Dubuque
- Seat: Dubuque
- Largest city: Dubuque

Area
  - Total: 616.461 sq mi (1,596.63 km^{2})
  - Land: 608.299 sq mi (1,575.49 km^{2})
  - Water: 8.162 sq mi (21.14 km^{2}) 1.32%

Population (2020)
  - Total: 99,266
  - Estimate (2025): 99,381 ▲
  - Density: 163.19/sq mi (63.007/km^{2})
- Time zone: UTC−6 (Central)
  - Summer (DST): UTC−5 (CDT)
- Area code: 563
- Congressional district: 2nd
- Website: dubuquecountyiowa.gov
- Iowa county number 31

Dubuque County is a county located in the U.S. state of Iowa. As of the 2020 census, the population was 99,266, and was estimated to be 99,381 in 2025, making it the ninth-most populous county in Iowa. The county seat is Dubuque. The county is named for Julien Dubuque, the first European settler of Iowa. Dubuque County comprises the Dubuque, Iowa Metropolitan statistical area.

== History ==
Dubuque County is named for French trader Julien Dubuque, the first European settler of Iowa, and an early lead mining pioneer in what is now Dubuque County. Dubuque was French Canadian and had (by most accounts) a friendly relationship with the local Meskwaki people. He and other early pioneers established a lucrative mining and trading industry in the area. When lead deposits began becoming exhausted, the pioneers developed boat building, lumber yards, milling, brewing, and machinery manufacturing to take its place.

The city of Dubuque was chartered in 1833 as the first city in Iowa. The establishment of the City of Dubuque in 1833 led to large-scale settlement of the surrounding area. This was greatly encouraged by the Roman Catholic Church, which sent priests, bishops, and nuns to establish churches in the unpopulated countryside. Primarily, Irish and German (many of whom were Catholic) immigrants came to the region.

At an extra session of the Sixth Legislative Assembly of Michigan Territory held in September 1834, the Iowa District was divided into two counties by running a line due west from the lower end of Rock Island in the Mississippi River. The territory north of this line (which started just south of the present-day Davenport) was named Dubuque County, and all south of it was Demoine County [sic]. Thus, at that time Dubuque County nominally included not only much of what is now the state of Minnesota but portions of what are now North Dakota and South Dakota.

Dubuque County became part of Wisconsin Territory once it was split off from Michigan Territory on July 3, 1836. A massive reorganization and reduction of the county's size was executed on December 21, 1837, when its original area was separated into 13 named new counties and a "non-county area". The land in present day Minnesota and the Dakotas was transferred to the newly created Fayette County in this action. Dubuque County became a part of Iowa Territory upon its creation on July 4, 1838.

In 1858, Saint Francis Catholic Church was established in Dubuque County.

In the 1980s, the farm crisis set in, and devastated large sections of the Midwest, including Dubuque County. Since the area was heavily dependent on agriculture-related industries like John Deere and the Dubuque Packing Company, unemployment soared. In one month of 1982, Dubuque County had 23% unemployment, the highest in the nation. The county experienced huge population losses during this time, as workers left the area. It would not fully recover from this until the late 1990s, when the economy diversified, shifting away from manufacturing, and toward various service-related establishments.

In 2021, the Dubuque County Minutemen baseball team advanced to the American Legion World Series semi-finals, the first team from Iowa to advance that far since Cedar Rapids, IA in 1975.

== Government ==
Dubuque County is governed by a three-member Board of Supervisors elected at large. Current supervisors include Ann McDonough, Wayne Kenniker and Harley Pothoff (chairperson). They meet the 1st and 3rd Monday of each month at 9:00 a.m. in the Dubuque County Courthouse.

The current county attorney is Scott Nelson, who succeeded C.J. May in 2023.

The current county auditor is Kevin Dragotto, who succeeded Denise Dolan in 2021.

The current county treasurer is Michael Clasen, who succeeded Eric Steirman in 2022

=== Law enforcement ===
Dubuque County Sheriff's Office
- Abbreviation: DCSO

Jurisdictional structure
- Operations jurisdiction: Dubuque, Iowa, USA
- Map of Dubuque County Sheriff's Office's jurisdiction
- Area: 617 square miles (1,600 km^{2})
- Population: 99,242 (2024)
- General nature: Local civilian police

Operational structure
- Headquarters: 770 Iowa Street, Dubuque, Iowa
- Sheriff responsible: Joseph L. Kennedy (since 2016)

Website
- Official website

The county sheriff's office provides law enforcement services for unincorporated areas of Dubuque County, as well as providing courthouse security, operating the county jail, and performing civil procedures. The Sheriff's Department is located at the Dubuque City/County Law Enforcement Center. The department shares facilities and other resources with the Dubuque Police Department.

== Geography ==
=== Geographic features ===
The county borders on Illinois and Wisconsin, and is bounded on the northeast by the Mississippi River. According to the United States Census Bureau, the county has a total area of 616.461 square miles (1,596.63 km^{2}), of which 608.299 square miles (1,575.49 km^{2}) is land and 8.162 square miles (21.14 km^{2}) (1.32%) is water. It is the 21st largest county in Iowa by total area. The county is drained by north and south forks of the Maquoketa River.

The county seat is Dubuque, Iowa, which is located along the Mississippi River in the east-central portion of the county. Eastern Dubuque County is markedly different from the western portion in that its topography is very uneven. The city of Dubuque and surrounding areas adjacent to the Mississippi River have many steep hills, bluffs, and ravines. Also, the eastern portion is more heavily wooded than the west, which is mostly rolling farmland.

Dubuque County is widely known for its impressive bluffs along the Mississippi River, which run along the entire length of the county's riverbanks. These form part of Iowa's Coulee Region, otherwise known as the Driftless Area. During the last ice age, much of the Mississippi Valley near Dubuque County was bypassed by glacial flows, which flattened the surrounding land in eastern Illinois, Wisconsin, and western Iowa, leaving the Driftless Area unusually rugged.

=== Major parks ===
The Iowa Department of Natural Resources administers 3 park and preserve areas in the county:

- Little Maquoketa River Mounds State Preserve
- Mines of Spain State Recreation Area/E. B. Lyons Nature Center
- White Pine Hollow State Forest

The Dubuque County Conservation Board administers 11 park and recreation areas in the county:

- Bankston Park
- Fillmore Recreation Area & Fairways
- Finley's Landing Park
- Heritage Trail & Pond
- Interstate Power Forest Preserve
- Massey Marina Park
- Mud Lake Park
- New Wine Park
- Pohlman Prairie Preserve
- Swiss Valley Nature Park & Preserve
- Whitewater Canyon Park

The City of Dubuque and other towns in the county also operate public park systems of their own. (see Parks in Dubuque, Iowa)

=== Major highways ===
- U.S. Highway 20
- U.S. Highway 52
- U.S. Highway 61
- U.S. Highway 151
- Iowa Highway 3
- Iowa Highway 32
- Iowa Highway 136

=== Transit ===
- The Jule

=== Adjacent counties ===
- Clayton County (north)
- Grant County, Wisconsin (northeast)
- Jo Daviess County, Illinois (east)
- Jackson County (southeast)
- Jones County (southwest)
- Delaware County (west)

=== National protected areas ===
- Driftless Area National Wildlife Refuge (part)
- Upper Mississippi River National Wildlife and Fish Refuge (part)

== Demographics ==
Historical population
| Census | Pop. | Note | %± |
|---|---|---|---|
| 1840 | 3,059 | | — |
| 1850 | 10,841 | | 254.4% |
| 1860 | 31,164 | | 187.5% |
| 1870 | 38,969 | | 25.0% |
| 1880 | 42,996 | | 10.3% |
| 1890 | 49,848 | | 15.9% |
| 1900 | 56,403 | | 13.1% |
| 1910 | 57,450 | | 1.9% |
| 1920 | 58,262 | | 1.4% |
| 1930 | 61,214 | | 5.1% |
| 1940 | 63,768 | | 4.2% |
| 1950 | 71,337 | | 11.9% |
| 1960 | 80,048 | | 12.2% |
| 1970 | 90,609 | | 13.2% |
| 1980 | 93,745 | | 3.5% |
| 1990 | 86,403 | | −7.8% |
| 2000 | 89,143 | | 3.2% |
| 2010 | 93,653 | | 5.1% |
| 2020 | 99,266 | | 6.0% |
| 2025 (est.) | 99,381 | ▲ | 0.1% |
U.S. Decennial Census; 1790–1960 1900–1990; 1990–2000 2010–2020

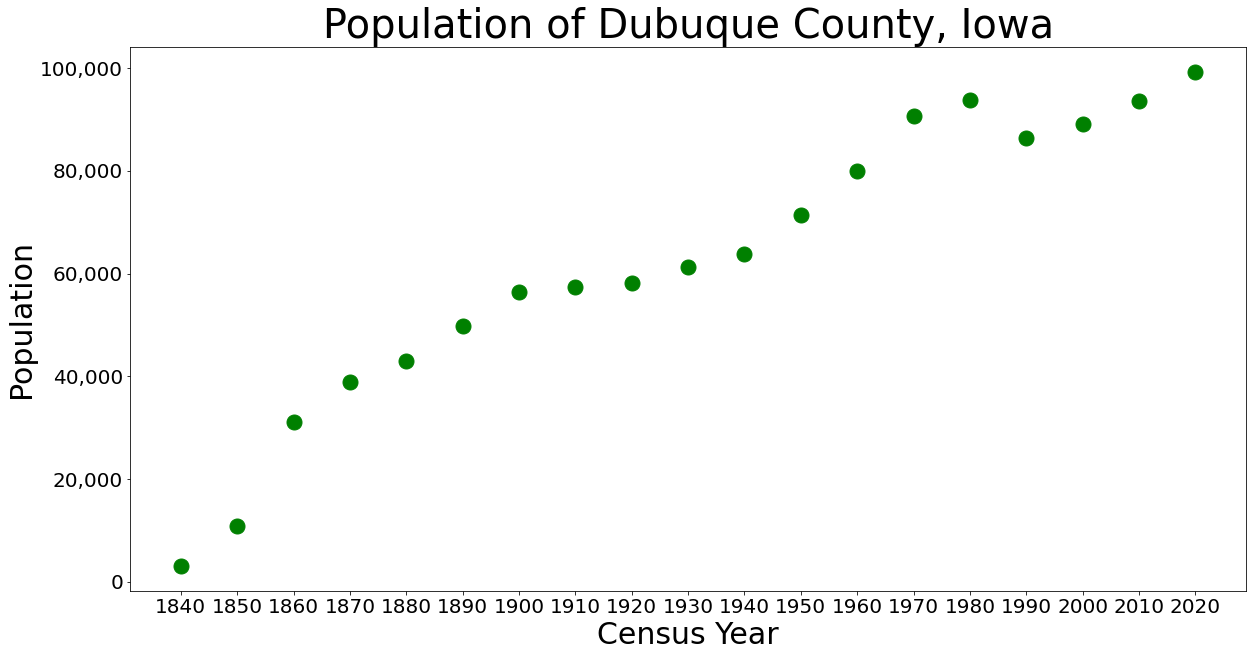
Population of Dubuque County from US census data

=== 2020 census ===
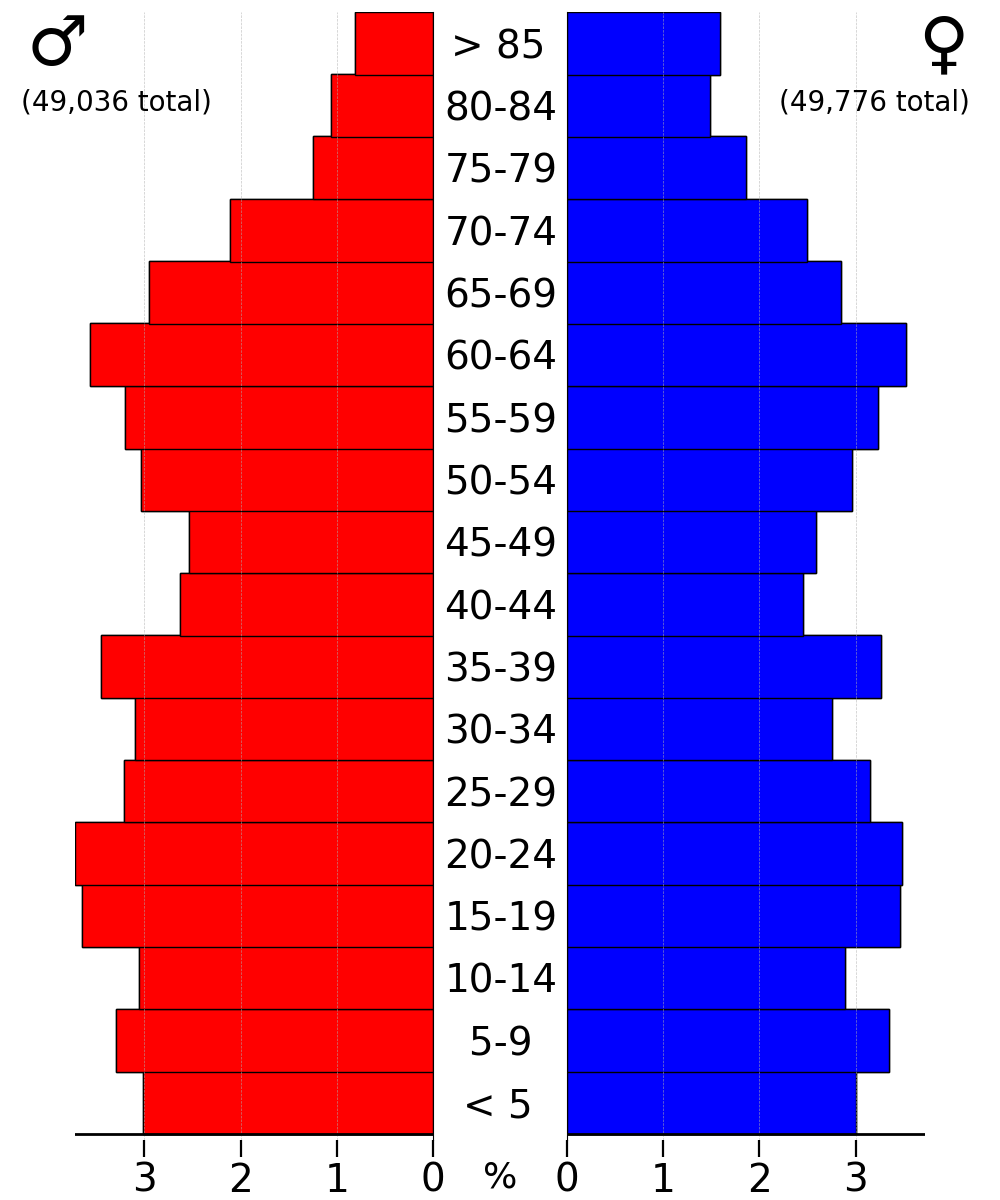
2022 US Census population pyramid for Dubuque County from ACS 5-year estimates

As of the 2020 census, the county had a population of 99,266, yielding a population density of 160.7/sq mi (62.0/km^{2}). There were 42,630 housing units, of which 39,891 were occupied.

Dubuque County Racial Composition
| Race | Number | Percent |
|---|---|---|
| White (NH) | 87,349 | 88.0% |
| Black or African American (NH) | 4,035 | 4.1% |
| Native American (NH) | 131 | 0.13% |
| Asian (NH) | 1,018 | 1.02% |
| Pacific Islander (NH) | 813 | 0.82% |
| Other/Mixed (NH) | 2,943 | 3.0% |
| Hispanic or Latino | 2,977 | 3.0% |

As of the 2020 census, the racial makeup of the county was 89.0% White, 4.2% Black or African American, 0.3% American Indian and Alaska Native, 1.0% Asian, 0.8% Native Hawaiian and Pacific Islander, 1.1% from some other race, and 3.7% from two or more races. Hispanic or Latino residents of any race comprised 3.0% of the population.

As of the 2020 census, the median age was 38.7 years. 22.5% of residents were under the age of 18 and 18.9% of residents were 65 years of age or older. For every 100 females there were 98.6 males, and for every 100 females age 18 and over there were 97.2 males age 18 and over.

As of the 2020 census, there were 39,891 households in the county, of which 27.8% had children under the age of 18 living in them. Of all households, 48.9% were married-couple households, 19.3% were households with a male householder and no spouse or partner present, and 24.8% were households with a female householder and no spouse or partner present. About 30.4% of all households were made up of individuals and 12.6% had someone living alone who was 65 years of age or older.

As of the 2020 census, there were 42,630 housing units, of which 6.4% were vacant. Among occupied housing units, 71.1% were owner-occupied and 28.9% were renter-occupied. The homeowner vacancy rate was 1.2% and the rental vacancy rate was 10.0%.

As of the 2020 census, 68.3% of residents lived in urban areas, while 31.7% lived in rural areas.

=== 2010 census ===
The 2010 census recorded a population of 93,653 in the county, with a population density of 154.0/sq mi (59.5/km^{2}). There were 38,951 housing units, of which 36,815 were occupied.

=== 2000 census ===
At the 2000 census, there were 89,143 people, 33,690 households and 23,111 families residing in the county. The population density was 147 per square mile (57/km^{2}). There were 35,505 housing units at an average density of 58 per square mile (22/km^{2}). The racial makeup of the county was 97.07% White, 0.86% Black or African American, 0.15% Native American, 0.58% Asian, 0.09% Pacific Islander, 0.50% from other races, and 0.76% from two or more races. 1.19% of the population were Hispanic or Latino of any race.

2005 estimates by the census indicated that Dubuque had a population that identified itself as being 95.5% non-Hispanic white, 1.3% African American, 0.7% Asian and 1.5% Latino.

There were 33,690 households, of which 33.10% had children under the age of 18 living with them, 56.80% were married couples living together, 8.70% had a female householder with no husband present, and 31.40% were non-families. 26.70% of all households were made up of individuals, and 10.80% had someone living alone who was 65 years of age or older. The average household size was 2.51 and the average family size was 3.07.

25.60% of the population were under the age of 18, 10.20% from 18 to 24, 27.20% from 25 to 44, 22.30% from 45 to 64, and 14.70% who were 65 years of age or older. The median age was 36 years. For every 100 females there were 94.40 males. For every 100 females age 18 and over, there were 91.30 males.

The median household income was $39,582 and the median family income was $48,742. Males had a median income of $31,977 versus $22,309 for females. The per capita income for the county was $19,600. About 4.90% of families and 7.80% of the population were below the poverty line, including 7.80% of those under age 18 and 11.00% of those age 65 or over.

== Economy ==
Historically, Dubuque County's economy was driven by heavy industry, including, among others, John Deere, and the now-defunct Dubuque Packing Company. However, within the last 20 years, and especially within the last 10 years, the economy has diversified. Now, alongside manufacturing, which still employs thousands of workers, many county residents work in the tourism/gaming, health care, education, publishing, and financial service sectors.

The county's economy is largely centered around business and industry within the City of Dubuque. With the exception of industrial areas in Cascade, Dyersville, and Peosta, almost all of the rest of the county is rural and agriculturally driven. Some of the key industries in Dubuque County include: John Deere, Eagle Window & Door Co., Flexsteel Industries, Mi-T-M Corp., A.Y. McDonald Mfg. Co., Klauer Mfg., Georgia-Pacific, and Swiss Valley Farms, among others. Besides industry, large numbers of people work for the Dubuque Community School District, Mercy Medical Center - Dubuque, Medical Associates, Finley Hospital, Prudential Financial, the City of Dubuque, and Cottingham & Butler.

=== Growth ===
Dubuque County has, in recent years, enjoyed job growth, low unemployment, and the rapid expansion of business and commerce. Alongside these positives, the county is beginning to see a growing population, as well. Up from a recent low of 86,403 in 1990, the population is now about 97,000 and growing. This can be seen especially in the West Side of the City of Dubuque, and in nearby Asbury and Peosta. This fact is especially significant, considering that all of the counties surrounding Dubuque County have fewer people now than they did in 1900, with the exception of Grant County, Wisconsin.

== Politics ==
United States presidential election results for Dubuque County, Iowa
| Year | Republican | | Democratic | | Third party(ies) | |
| Year | No. | % | No. | % | No. | % |
|---|---|---|---|---|---|---|
| 1896 | 5,203 | 43.73% | 6,510 | 54.72% | 185 | 1.55% |
| 1900 | 4,752 | 41.09% | 6,655 | 57.55% | 157 | 1.36% |
| 1904 | 5,485 | 48.31% | 4,913 | 43.27% | 955 | 8.41% |
| 1908 | 4,708 | 39.71% | 6,645 | 56.05% | 502 | 4.23% |
| 1912 | 1,620 | 13.82% | 6,237 | 53.20% | 3,867 | 32.98% |
| 1916 | 5,772 | 47.22% | 6,063 | 49.60% | 388 | 3.17% |
| 1920 | 12,436 | 59.22% | 7,636 | 36.36% | 928 | 4.42% |
| 1924 | 8,280 | 32.77% | 5,718 | 22.63% | 11,269 | 44.60% |
| 1928 | 9,744 | 33.30% | 19,437 | 66.42% | 81 | 0.28% |
| 1932 | 6,747 | 24.99% | 19,210 | 71.15% | 1,042 | 3.86% |
| 1936 | 8,275 | 30.22% | 16,291 | 59.50% | 2,812 | 10.27% |
| 1940 | 14,590 | 51.30% | 13,805 | 48.54% | 46 | 0.16% |
| 1944 | 12,502 | 49.11% | 12,867 | 50.54% | 89 | 0.35% |
| 1948 | 10,111 | 39.02% | 15,521 | 59.90% | 281 | 1.08% |
| 1952 | 18,075 | 55.03% | 14,542 | 44.27% | 228 | 0.69% |
| 1956 | 17,923 | 57.36% | 13,174 | 42.16% | 150 | 0.48% |
| 1960 | 12,740 | 36.64% | 22,007 | 63.30% | 19 | 0.05% |
| 1964 | 10,104 | 29.87% | 23,695 | 70.06% | 24 | 0.07% |
| 1968 | 14,197 | 40.72% | 18,664 | 53.54% | 2,002 | 5.74% |
| 1972 | 17,272 | 47.29% | 18,417 | 50.43% | 832 | 2.28% |
| 1976 | 17,459 | 44.71% | 20,548 | 52.62% | 1,042 | 2.67% |
| 1980 | 18,649 | 44.90% | 18,689 | 44.99% | 4,201 | 10.11% |
| 1984 | 19,239 | 46.37% | 21,876 | 52.72% | 376 | 0.91% |
| 1988 | 14,530 | 37.69% | 23,797 | 61.74% | 220 | 0.57% |
| 1992 | 14,007 | 32.60% | 20,539 | 47.80% | 8,422 | 19.60% |
| 1996 | 13,391 | 35.19% | 20,839 | 54.77% | 3,821 | 10.04% |
| 2000 | 16,462 | 40.83% | 22,341 | 55.41% | 1,520 | 3.77% |
| 2004 | 20,100 | 42.73% | 26,561 | 56.46% | 382 | 0.81% |
| 2008 | 18,651 | 38.89% | 28,611 | 59.65% | 701 | 1.46% |
| 2012 | 21,280 | 41.81% | 28,768 | 56.53% | 846 | 1.66% |
| 2016 | 23,460 | 47.18% | 22,850 | 45.96% | 3,411 | 6.86% |
| 2020 | 27,214 | 50.47% | 25,657 | 47.58% | 1,055 | 1.96% |
| 2024 | 28,224 | 53.48% | 23,705 | 44.92% | 841 | 1.59% |

Dubuque County was historically Democratic and supported every Democratic Party Presidential candidate from John F. Kennedy to Barack Obama, with President Obama winning the county by over 20 points in 2008. In 2016, it was narrowly won by Donald Trump, who became the first Republican to win the county since President Eisenhower in 1956. Trump won the county again in 2020, by a larger margin, and again in 2024 by an even larger margin. In the 2022 elections, the county continued to trend rightward, with Republican governor Kim Reynolds winning reelection by a margin of over 16 points. The county additionally voted for Republican Chuck Grassley in U.S. Senate election and for Republican Ashley Hinson in the election for U.S. House of Representatives for Iowa's 1st congressional district.

== Education ==
Tertiary education:

- Capri Cosmetology College
- Clarke University
- Divine Word College
- Emmaus University
- Loras College
- Northeast Iowa Community College
- University of Dubuque
- Wartburg Theological Seminary

K-12 school districts include:

- Dubuque Community School District
- Maquoketa Community School District
- Monticello Community School District
- Western Dubuque Community School District

== Religion ==
As of 2022, Dubuque County has a large percentage of Catholic residents.

== Communities ==
=== Cities ===
- Asbury
- Balltown
- Bankston
- Bernard
- Cascade
- Centralia
- Dubuque
- Durango
- Dyersville
- Epworth
- Farley
- Graf
- Holy Cross
- Luxemburg
- New Vienna
- Peosta
- Rickardsville
- Sageville
- Sherrill
- Worthington
- Zwingle

=== Unincorporated communities ===
- Ballyclough
- Bennettsville
- Center Grove
- Fillmore
- Five Points
- Key West
- Massey
- Old Balltown
- Rockdale
- Shawondasse
- Waupeton
- Washington Mills

=== Townships ===
Dubuque County is divided into eighteen townships:

- Cascade
- Center
- Concord
- Dodge
- Dubuque
- Iowa
- Jefferson
- Julien
- Liberty
- Mosalem
- New Wine
- Peru
- Prairie Creek
- Table Mound
- Taylor
- Vernon
- Washington
- Whitewater

=== Population ranking ===
List of Cities in Dubuque County ranked by population Recorded by the United States Census Bureau† 'county seat'
| Rank | City | 2020 City Population | 2010 City Population | Change |
|---|---|---|---|---|
| 1 | Dubuque† | 59,667 | 57,637 | +3.52% |
| 2 | Asbury | 5,943 | 4,170 | +42.52% |
| 3 | Dyersville (partially in Delaware County) | 4,477 | 4,058 | +10.33% |
| 4 | Cascade (partially in Jones County) | 2,386 | 2,159 | +10.51% |
| 5 | Epworth | 2,023 | 1,860 | +8.76% |
| 6 | Peosta | 1,908 | 1,377 | +38.56% |
| 7 | Farley | 1,766 | 1,537 | +14.90% |
| 8 | New Vienna | 382 | 407 | −6.14% |
| 9 | Worthington | 382 | 401 | −4.74% |
| 10 | Holy Cross | 356 | 374 | −4.81% |
| 11 | Luxemburg | 245 | 240 | +2.08% |
| 12 | Rickardsville | 202 | 182 | +10.99% |
| 13 | Sherrill | 189 | 177 | +6.78% |
| 14 | Centralia | 116 | 134 | −13.43% |
| 15 | Bernard | 114 | 112 | +1.79% |
| 16 | Sageville | 95 | 122 | −22.13% |
| 17 | Zwingle (partially in Jackson County) | 84 | 91 | −7.69% |
| 18 | Balltown | 79 | 68 | +16.18% |
| 19 | Bankston | 23 | 25 | −8.00% |
| 20 | Durango | 20 | 22 | −9.09% |

== See also ==
- List of counties in Iowa
- National Register of Historic Places listings in Dubuque County, Iowa
