= Asbury, Iowa =

- City
- Motto: "You're Home."
- Interactive map of Asbury, Iowa
- Location within Iowa Location within the United States
- Coordinates: 42°30′26″N 90°45′48″W
- Country: United States
- State: Iowa
- County: Dubuque
- Founded: 1830s
- Incorporated: 1933

Area
  - Total: 3.17 sq mi (8.22 km^{2})
  - Land: 3.17 sq mi (8.22 km^{2})
  - Water: 0 sq mi (0.00 km^{2})
- Elevation: 951 ft (290 m)

Population (2020)
  - Total: 5,943
  - Density: 1,871.4/sq mi (722.55/km^{2})
- Time zone: UTC-6 (CST)
  - Summer (DST): UTC-5 (CDT)
- ZIP code: 52002
- Area code: 563
- FIPS code: 19-03160
- GNIS feature ID: 2393994
- Website: www.cityofasbury.com

Asbury is a city in Dubuque County, Iowa, United States. It is adjacent to the westside of Dubuque, Iowa, and is part of the Dubuque metropolitan statistical area. The population was 5,943 at the 2020 census. Asbury is the second-largest city in Dubuque County and is largely a bedroom community, made up of subdivisions whose residents work in Dubuque or Peosta.

== History ==
Asbury was settled beginning in the 1830s, at first by Methodists. The city is named after British-born Bishop Francis Asbury, one of the first two bishops of the Methodist Episcopal Church in the United States. The city was incorporated in 1933, following the passage of the Twenty-first Amendment to the United States Constitution, which ended prohibition. The city incorporated to gain the legal standing necessary to sell alcohol, as liquor licenses were still forbidden in rural areas.

For most of its history, Asbury was very small, much like hundreds of other towns in rural Iowa. In the 1960 census, Asbury still had only 71 residents. During this time, the City of Dubuque grew immensely, and the sprawl reached the Asbury area beginning in the 1960s. By 1970, Asbury had 410 residents and had grown fast enough to become the fastest growing city in the state of Iowa.

== Geography ==
According to the United States Census Bureau, the city has a total area of 2.66 square miles (6.89 km^{2}), all land.

The city operates four parks and pedestrian and mountain bike trails. The parks include: Althaus Wetland & Nature Preserve, Asbury Park, Cloie Creek Park, and Maple Hills Park. The trail runs from Asbury Rd. to Maple Hills Park, and is part of Asbury's plan for having a citywide trail network.

== Economy ==
Serving primarily as a bedroom community, Asbury has only a small local economy. Most of its residents commute to work in Dubuque. Only a handful of businesses operate within the City of Asbury, however, this number has grown in recent years, along with an expanding population. Most people who do work in Asbury either are employed by the city government, or in the service-related businesses along Asbury and Saratoga Roads.

== Demographics ==
Historical populations
Year	Pop.	±%
1940	27	—
1950	52	+92.6%
1960	71	+36.5%
1970	410	+477.5%
1980	2,017	+392.0%
1990	2,013	−0.2%
2000	2,450	+21.7%
2010	4,170	+70.2%
2020	5,943	+42.5%
Source:"U.S. Census website". United States Census Bureau. and Iowa Data Center; Source: U.S. Decennial Census

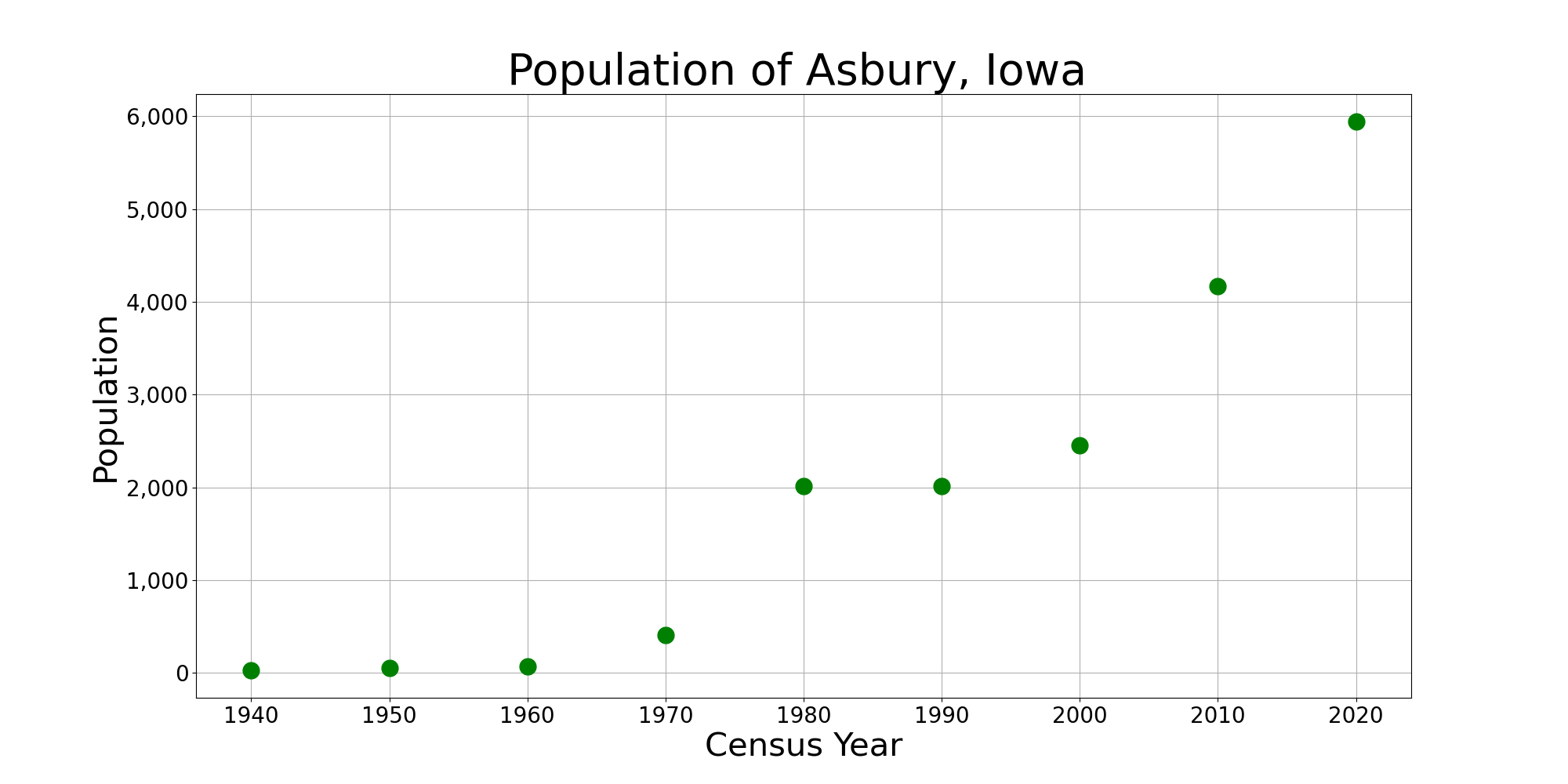
The population of Asbury, Iowa from US census data

=== 2020 census ===
As of the 2020 census, there were 5,943 people, 2,068 households, and 1,659 families residing in the city. The population density was 1,871.4 inhabitants per square mile (722.6/km^{2}). There were 2,128 housing units at an average density of 670.1 per square mile (258.7/km^{2}).

The median age in the city was 39.1 years. 29.5% of residents were under the age of 18 and 18.4% were 65 years of age or older. For every 100 females, there were 92.5 males, and for every 100 females age 18 and over, there were 91.2 males age 18 and over. Of residents, 31.8% were under the age of 20; 3.9% were between the ages of 20 and 24; 22.2% were from 25 to 44; and 23.7% were from 45 to 64. The gender makeup of the city was 48.0% male and 52.0% female.

Of households, 41.4% had children under the age of 18 living with them. Of all households, 70.9% were married-couple households, 4.1% were cohabitating couples, 8.3% had a male householder with no spouse or partner present, and 16.6% had a female householder with no spouse or partner present. 19.8% of all households were non-families. 17.0% of all households were made up of individuals, and 11.3% had someone living alone who was 65 years old or older.

Of housing units, 2.8% were vacant. The homeowner vacancy rate was 0.9% and the rental vacancy rate was 7.1%. 97.8% of residents lived in urban areas, while 2.2% lived in rural areas.

Racial composition as of the 2020 census
Race	Number	Percent
White	5,454	91.8%
Black or African American	104	1.7%
American Indian and Alaska Native	1	0.0%
Asian	116	2.0%
Native Hawaiian and Other Pacific Islander	17	0.3%
Some other race	22	0.4%
Two or more races	229	3.9%
Hispanic or Latino (of any race)	128	2.2%

=== 2010 census ===
As of the census of 2010, there were 4,170 people, 1,433 households, and 1,164 families residing in the city. The population density was 1,567.7 inhabitants per square mile (605.3/km^{2}). There were 1,463 housing units at an average density of 550.0 per square mile (212.4/km^{2}). The racial makeup of the city was 96.8% White, 1.0% African American, 1.1% Asian, 0.3% from other races, and 0.8% from two or more races. Hispanic or Latino of any race were 1.4% of the population.

There were 1,433 households, of which 45.4% had children under the age of 18 living with them, 71.5% were married couples living together, 7.0% had a female householder with no husband present, 2.8% had a male householder with no wife present, and 18.8% were non-families. 15.3% of all households were made up of individuals, and 5.7% had someone living alone who was 65 years of age or older. The average household size was 2.91 and the average family size was 3.27.

The median age in the city was 35.6 years. 32.9% of residents were under the age of 18; 6% were between the ages of 18 and 24; 26% were from 25 to 44; 25.4% were from 45 to 64; and 9.9% were 65 years of age or older. The gender makeup of the city was 49.2% male and 50.8% female.

=== 2000 census ===
As of the census of 2000, there were 2,450 people, 846 households, and 728 families residing in the city. The population density was 971.8 inhabitants per square mile (375.2/km^{2}). There were 867 housing units at an average density of 343.9 per square mile (132.8/km^{2}). The racial makeup of the city was 98.49% White, 0.49% African American, 0.37% Asian, 0.04% Pacific Islander, 0.24% from other races, and 0.37% from two or more races. Hispanic or Latino of any race were 0.73% of the population.

There were 846 households, out of which 44.4% had children under the age of 18 living with them, 77.8% were married couples living together, 6.6% had a female householder with no husband present, and 13.9% were non-families. 11.0% of all households were made up of individuals, and 2.8% had someone living alone who was 65 years of age or older. The average household size was 2.90 and the average family size was 3.13.

30.7% are under the age of 18, 7.1% from 18 to 24, 27.7% from 25 to 44, 27.8% from 45 to 64, and 6.7% who were 65 years of age or older. The median age was 36 years. For every 100 females, there were 98.5 males. For every 100 females age 18 and over, there were 98.5 males.

The median income for a household in the city was $60,100, and the median income for a family was $64,097. Males had a median income of $41,935 versus $25,337 for females. The per capita income for the city was $21,447. About 4.5% of families and 4.0% of the population were below the poverty line, including 4.3% of those under age 18 and 7.9% of those age 65 or over.

== Government ==
Asbury has a mayor–council form of government, employing a full-time city administrator, and part-time city council (a mayor and five at-large city council members). The city administrator is Beth Bonz, the current mayor is Jim Adams, and the council members are: Bob Reisch, Craig Miller, John Richey, Curt Kiessling and Larry Nagle. The city council meets at 7 P.M. on the second and fourth Tuesdays of every month at Asbury City Hall.

The city council works on the advice of a number of citizen committees, including the following: Building Code Commission, Park & Recreation Board, Planning & Zoning Commission, Zoning Board of Adjustment, and the Water Board. In addition, Asbury sends commissioners to the Eastern Iowa Housing Authority. Asbury has 3 city departments: Public Safety (police and fire), public works, and parks.

In the Iowa General Assembly, Asbury is represented by Senator Carrie Koelker (Republican), and Representative Shannon Lundgren (Republican) in the Iowa House of Representatives. At the federal level, it is within Iowa's 1st congressional district, represented by Ashley Hinson (R) in the U.S. House of Representatives. Asbury, and all of Iowa, are represented by U.S. Senators Chuck Grassley (R) and Joni Ernst (R).

== Education ==
All students in Asbury are zoned to public schools in the Dubuque Community School District. Elementary school students living in the central, eastern, and southern parts of Asbury are zoned to Carver Elementary School. Other students in northern, western, and southwestern Asbury (Arrowhead, Brook Haven, Forest Hills, Long Grove, Wedgewood) are zoned to Kennedy Elementary School. Asbury's middle school students are zoned to Roosevelt Middle School, and high school students are zoned to Hempstead High School.

There are no private schools operating in Asbury. Some students are enrolled in the Holy Family Catholic Schools system.
