= Dubuque Senior High School =

Public secondary school in Dubuque, Iowa, United States

Coordinates: 42.506°N 90.694°W

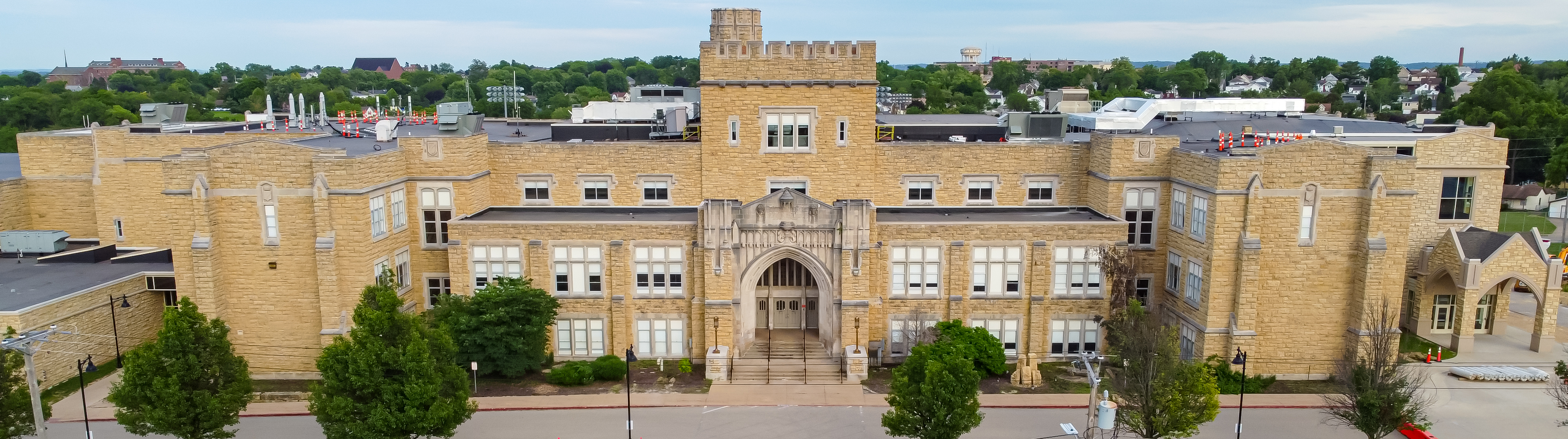

Location
- 1800 Clarke Drive; Dubuque, Iowa 52001

Information
- School type: Public high school
- Established: 1858
- School district: Dubuque Community School District
- Oversight: Iowa Department of Education
- Principal: Mr. Brian Howes
- Staff: 130.67 (FTE)
- Grades: 9–12
- Enrollment: 1,466 (2023-2024)
- Student to teacher ratio: 11.22
- Campus: Urban
- Colors: Scarlet and Columbia blue
- Mascot: Ram
- Newspaper: Rampage
- Yearbook: Echo
- Athletic conference: Mississippi Valley Conference
- Website: senior.dbqschools.org

Dubuque Senior High School (commonly Senior or DSHS) is a four-year public high school located in Dubuque, Iowa. It is one of two high schools in the Dubuque Community School District, and enrolls 1,447 students in grades 9–12. The school's mascot is the Ram; it competes at the state level in class 4A (which contains the state's largest schools) and is a member of the Mississippi Valley Athletic Conference.

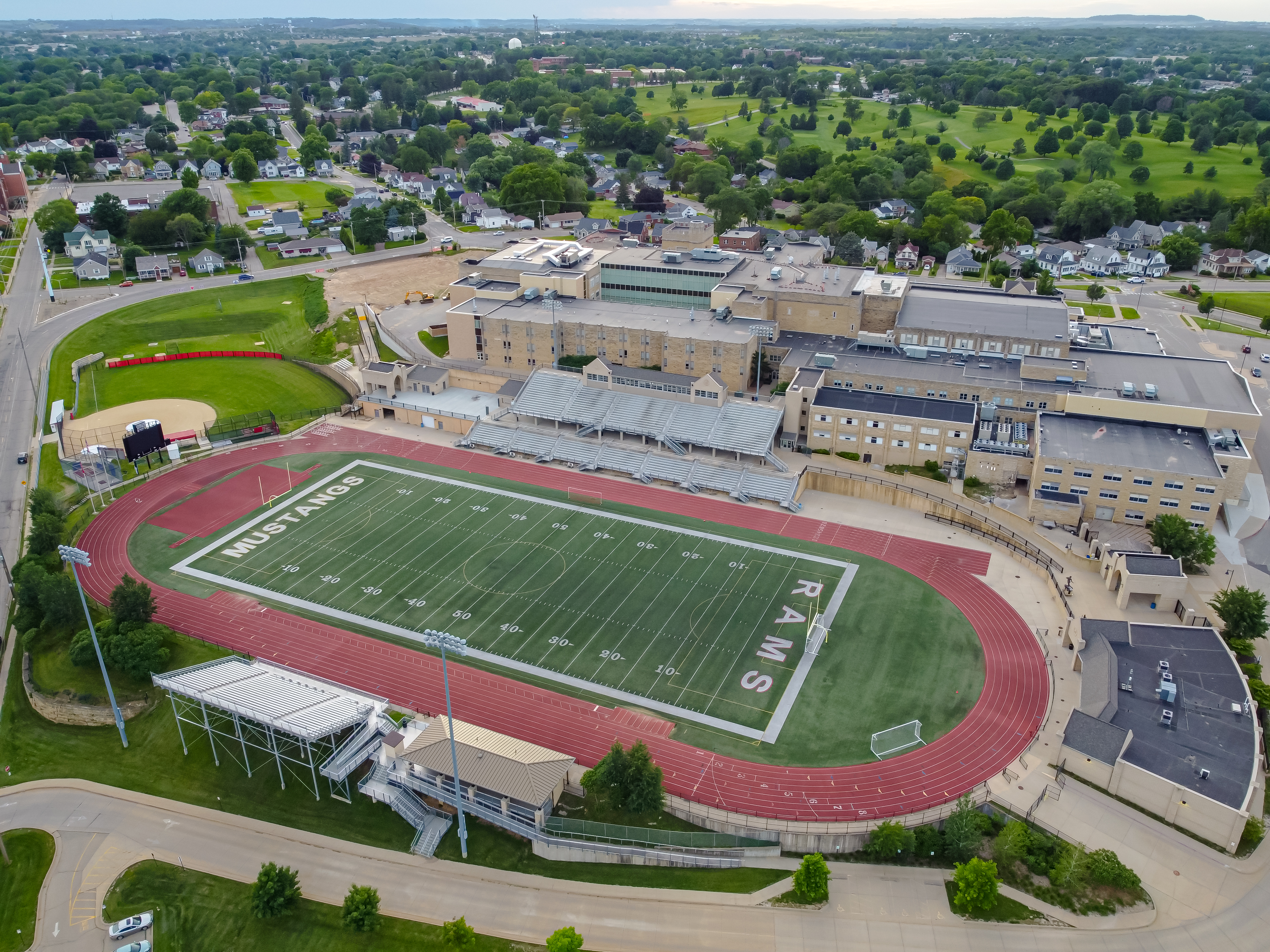
Dubuque Senior High School athletic fields

== History ==
Dubuque High School, the first high school in Dubuque, Iowa, was opened in 1858 on the third floor of a building on the southwest corner of Central Avenue and 12th Street (currently the site of the old Prescott Elementary School playground). The school enrolled 110 students and had a staff of two teachers and one principal. The institution was moved to a building at 17th and Iowa Streets in 1859 and then closed until 1866. Reasons given for the closure included the start of the Civil War, economic depression, and a feeling among the residents of Dubuque that an elementary education was sufficient.

In 1866 the high school was reopened. The district's administrative office was moved to the high school in 1872.

A complete high school course in the early years was three years in length. The first graduating class in 1870 had only two students, Sarah M. Belden and Mary O. Dorgan. Only 25 students graduated from the program between 1870 and 1876. The original teaching staff included the principal and up to three teachers.

By 1877 most courses were extended to four years. A four-year Latin program, scientific and classical programs, and a two-year business course were offered. From 1877 to 1885 the number of graduates soared to 219. In 1895, the two-year business program was discontinued and the high school became strictly a four-year program.

In 1893 the proposal to issue bonds in the amount of $75,000 to purchase a site and erect a new high school on the corner of 15th and Locust Streets was approved by Dubuque voters by a margin of 956 to 235. Central High School, as it was called then, was dedicated in 1895. Central High School was constructed of coarse-cut Wisconsin red sandstone with massive arches and a soaring clock tower. The interior of the building featured maple and oak woodwork.

At a special election held in 1920, voters approved the construction of a new high school to be located at the corner of Seminary Street (Clarke Drive) and West Locust, the present site of Dubuque Senior High School. The land, purchased from the Sisters of Charity, B.V.M., cost $45,335. Dubuque Senior High School was built at a cost of $766,179 and was formally dedicated on February 9, 1923. Enrollment the first year reached 733 students. Much of the stone used to build the current building was quarried from the site.

With the help of funding from the Works Progress Administration (WPA), a girls' gymnasium, lockers, dressing rooms, shower room, football practice field, and band room were added to the school between 1923 and 1940.

A technical building and a gymnasium were dedicated on November 12, 1954. In 1964 Dalzell Field was dedicated to Coach Wilbur Dalzell, who later in 1968 joined the Iowa Coaches Hall of Fame. Additional classrooms and a library were added in 1965-1966 due to increasing enrollment. This three-story addition to the existing building created the enclosed courtyard.

The ever-increasing enrollment of the late 1960s brought the need for Dubuque's second high school. However, because of construction delays, the Stephen Hempstead Senior High School was not ready for classes on September 2, 1969. As a temporary solution to this dilemma, all Dubuque Senior High classes were shortened, with Senior students attending classes in the morning and Hempstead taking over in the afternoon. By January 1970, Hempstead opened its doors for the second semester and everyone's class schedule returned to normal.

The James J. Nora Gymnasium was dedicated on December 3, 1988, recognition of James J. Nora's many years of loyal service as a teacher, coach, employee, community leader, humanitarian, and exemplary role model for the youth of the community.

In 1990, a $5.3-million building addition to Senior High added departmental learning centers, a cafeteria/commons area, a new library, computer labs, and additional classrooms. Today, the Dubuque Senior High School facility comprises 288,580 square feet (26,810 m^{2}) of space to support greater educational opportunities.

In 2006 renovations began on the Lamb-Hedeman Auditorium with a new lighting system that is to be completed in early 2007. Further renovations are scheduled to begin in the summer of 2007, projects are expected to include the reopening of the balcony, new seating, a new stage floor, a new sound system and refurbishment of the house. Additional projects such as new rigging, and new curtains are also part of the plan for the auditorium.

In 2013, a $10 million renovation to Dalzell Field was completed. The project included multi-tiered home-side bleachers, a turf-surface field and a new eight-lane track. Funds from the 1-cent sales tax fund paid for the upgrades.

Beginning in 2017, renovations began to provide a new entrance and office area, a new library, a new cafeteria, a new gymnasium, and several new classrooms to the building.

== Students ==
In the 2014–2015 school year, DSHS enrolled 1,619 students. Of those, 1,363 (84.2%) were White, 104 (6.4%) were Black, 46 (2.8%) students were Hispanic, 40 (2.5%) were Asian, 3 (0.2%) were American Indian and 63 (3.9%) were of two or more races.

== Curriculum ==
In addition to the variety of standard high school/college prep. classes, Senior also offers a variety of Advanced Placement courses as well. The AP subjects taught are Human Geography, World History, US History, English Language and Composition, Statistics, English Literature and Composition, Biology, Chemistry, Psychology, Computer Science Principles, Government, Economics, Calculus AB, and Calculus BC. The Advanced Placement students that took the AP tests in 2006 earned Senior the 8th place in the state of Iowa for their scores.

== Notable alumni ==
- Jay Berwanger, football player, first winner of Heisman Trophy
- Dan Feltes, New Hampshire state Senator
- Johnny Gaudreau, NHL player who played for the Calgary Flames and the Columbus Blue Jackets
- Zemgus Girgensons, NHL player who plays for the Tampa Bay Lightning
- Fred Gloden, NFL player
- Dick Hoerner, NFL player
- Joe Hoerner, Major League Baseball pitcher
- Kyle Konrardy, college football player
- Brian Meyer, member of Iowa House of Representatives
- Johnny Orr, Dubuque Senior men's basketball coach 1950s, University of Michigan men's head basketball coach 1968-1980, and Iowa State University men's head basketball coach 1981-1994
- Landon Wilson, NHL player who played for the Colorado Avalanche, Boston Bruins, Phoenix Coyotes and Dallas Stars.
- Tom Preston-Werner, CEO of GitHub.

== Principals ==
- Mr. D.M. Case 1858
- Dr. C.W. Catlin 1858–1859
- Mr. A.J. Townsend, 1858–1859
- Mr. J.M. Brainard 1866–1867
- Mr. W.H. Beach 1868–1875
- Mr. J.D. Wells 1876–1877
- Mr. Hiram L. Peet 1878–1885
- Mr. Frederick L. Parker 1886–1889
- Mr. David Compton 1890–1895
- Mr. E.D. Walker 1896–1899
- Mr. F.L. Smart 1900–1900
- Mr. G.S. Gochanauer 1901–1902
- Mr. F.L. Smart 1903–1906
- Mr. F.A. Anderson 1907–1914
- Mr. S.W. Ehrman 1915–1917
- Mr. Fred G. Stevenson 1918–1924
- Mr. M.S. Hallman 1925–1926
- Mr. Ralph W Johnson 1927–1944
- Mr. T. Eldon Jackson 1945–1947
- Mr. George W. Lee 1948–1965
- Dr. Roger A. Kampschroer 1966–1968
- Mr. David C. Darsee 1969–1971
- Mr. Donald H Kolsrud 1972–1986
- Mr. G. Larry Mitchell 1986–2005
- Ms. Kim Swift, 2005–2011
- Mr. Rick Colpitts 2011–2012
- Mr. Daniel Merritt 2013–2013
- Dr. Daniel "DJ" Johnson 2013–2022
- Mr. Brian Howes 2022–present

== DSHS Athletics ==
Dubuque Senior competes in the state's Class 4A, and is a member of the Mississippi Valley Conference, one of the state's oldest and most successful conferences. Senior has had a great deal of success at the conference and state levels over the years, and has been known in the state for its strong women's teams. Senior has won state championships in several sports, most recently winning the 2009 men's swimming state championship, the school's (and the city's) first swimming team title.

=== Girls ===
- Cross Country
- Volleyball
  - 3-time State Champions (1973, 1980, 1983)
- Basketball
- Swimming
- Track
- Golf
  - 11-time State Champions (1958, 1959, 1960, 1961, 1962, 1963, 1965, 1991, 1992, 1998, 2000)
  - 1990 Coed State Champions
- Soccer
- Softball
  - 2-time State Champions (1974, 1985)
- Tennis
- Bowling

=== Boys ===
- Cross Country
  - 4-time State Champions (1925, 1987, 1995, 1998)
- Football
- Basketball
- Swimming
  - 2009 State Champions
- Wrestling
- Track
  - 1937 State Champions
- Golf
  - 1962 Class A State Champions
- Soccer
- Baseball
  - 1954 State Champions
- Tennis
  - 1998 Class 2A State Champions
- Bowling

=== Notable alumni ===
Jay Berwanger, first Heisman trophy winner while at the University of Chicago, played his prep football at Dubuque Senior. While at Senior, he was named to the Iowa all-state team and was a varsity letter winner.

== DSHS Theatre ==
The Dubuque Senior Theatre Department has been very successful over its history. The past two retired theatre directors (Ms. Sybil Lamb and Ms. Francis Hedeman) have both been inducted into the Iowa Thespian Hall of Fame. In the past 7 years, the DSHS Speech team has won 7 banners at the IHSSA All-State Contest (1 solo mime, 4 ensemble acting, 1 readers theatre, 1 One Act Play). During the 2008-2009, Senior production of "Almost, Maine" was 1 of 7 main-stage shows around the world selected to perform at the International Thespian conference. At the 2010 Iowa State Thespian conference, Senior performed "Rabbit Hole" on the Main Stage, as well as winning awards for 1st and 2nd place in duet acting, and 2nd place in solo mime. Their performance of "Rabbit Hole" also was selected to perform on the main-stage at the International Thespian conference in 2011.

== See also ==
- Dubuque Community School District
- Dubuque, Iowa
- List of high schools in Iowa
