= Holy Cross, Iowa =

- City
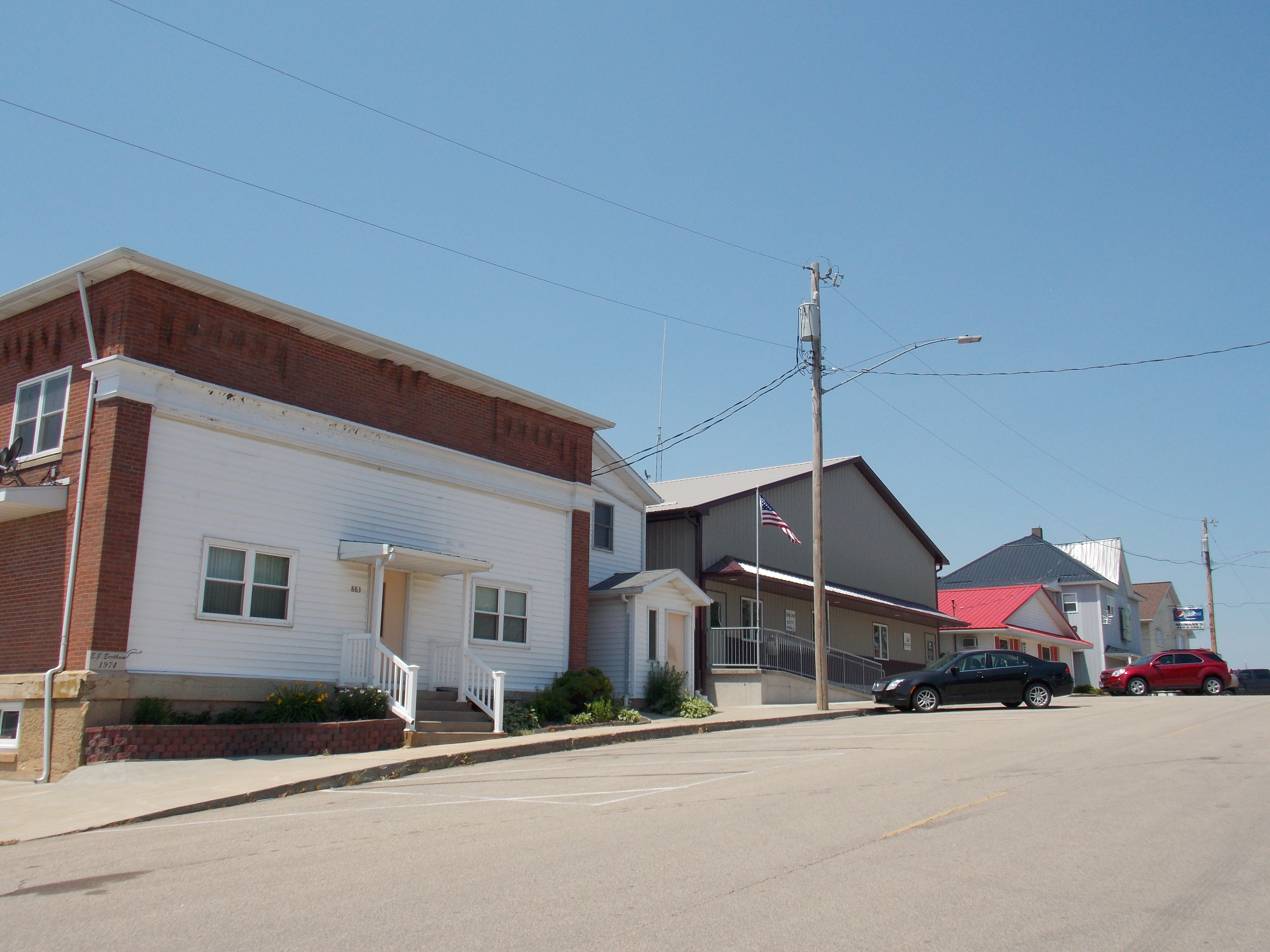
- Part of the commercial area in Holy Cross

- Location of Holy Cross, Iowa
- Coordinates: 42°36′05″N 90°59′55″W
- Country: United States
- State: Iowa
- County: Dubuque

Area
  - Total: 0.33 sq mi (0.85 km^{2})
  - Land: 0.33 sq mi (0.85 km^{2})
  - Water: 0 sq mi (0.00 km^{2})
- Elevation: 1,221 ft (372 m)

Population (2020)
  - Total: 356
  - Density: 1,086.0/sq mi (419.31/km^{2})
- Time zone: UTC-6 (Central (CST))
  - Summer (DST): UTC-5 (CDT)
- ZIP code: 52053
- Area code: 563
- FIPS code: 19-36885
- GNIS feature ID: 2394410

Holy Cross is a city in Dubuque County, Iowa, United States. It is part of the Dubuque, Iowa Metropolitan Statistical Area. The population was 356 at the time of the 2020 census, down from 374 in 2010.

== Geography ==
According to the United States Census Bureau, the city has a total area of 0.34 square miles (0.88 km^{2}), all land.

The city is located approximately four miles east of Luxemburg and about 25 miles northwest of Dubuque.

== History ==
Originally the community was settled by Irish and German immigrants in the early 19th century. The settlement became known as Pin Oak in 1844, the name originating from the many pin oak trees native to the area and after the rural post office located near there.

In 1855 the settlement's name changed again, to Georgetown. This name honored George Gallon, who offered to donate part of his land to build a town. In 1898 the name was once again changed to Holy Cross.

On May 17, 2004 several buildings in town were either damaged or destroyed when major storms ripped through the area. One notable casualty was the Holy Cross Catholic Church. The church suffered serious damage when part of its roof was ripped off in the storm. The interior of the church suffered water damage from the rain. Following the storm, a new roof was placed on the church building, and the interior was also repaired.

== Demographics ==
Historical populations
Year	Pop.	±%
1900	115	—
1910	143	+24.3%
1920	98	−31.5%
1930	111	+13.3%
1940	123	+10.8%
1950	139	+13.0%
1960	157	+12.9%
1970	290	+84.7%
1980	310	+6.9%
1990	293	−5.5%
2000	339	+15.7%
2010	374	+10.3%
2020	356	−4.8%
Source:"U.S. Census website". United States Census Bureau. and Iowa Data Center; Source: U.S. Decennial Census

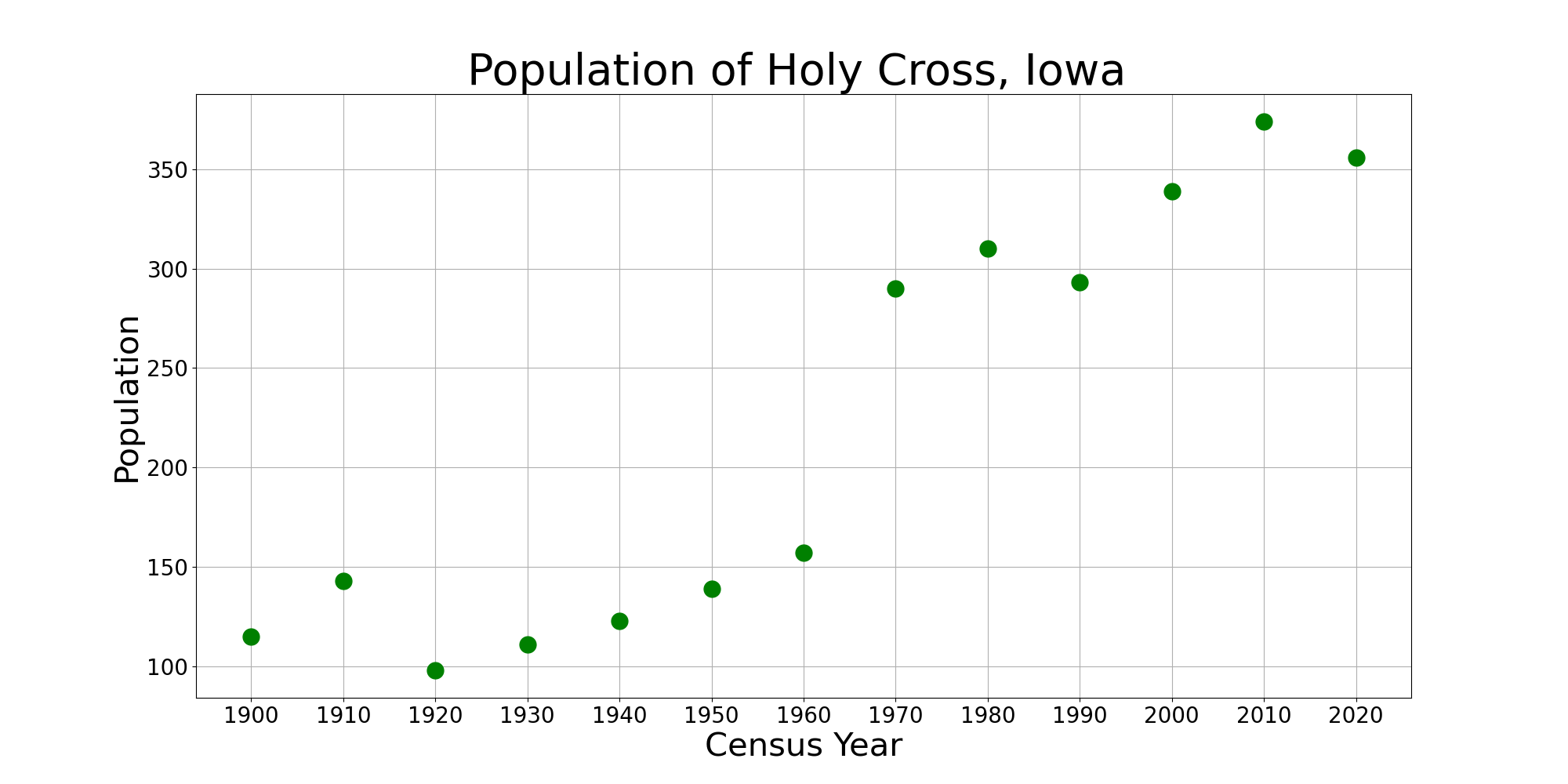
The population of Holy Cross, Iowa from US census data

=== 2020 census ===
As of the census of 2020, there were 356 people, 149 households, and 100 families residing in the city. The population density was 1,086.0 inhabitants per square mile (419.3/km^{2}). There were 159 housing units at an average density of 485.0 per square mile (187.3/km^{2}). The racial makeup of the city was 96.6% White, 0.0% Black or African American, 0.0% Native American, 0.0% Asian, 0.0% Pacific Islander, 0.0% from other races and 3.4% from two or more races. Hispanic or Latino persons of any race comprised 2.5% of the population.

Of the 149 households, 31.5% of which had children under the age of 18 living with them, 51.7% were married couples living together, 7.4% were cohabitating couples, 20.1% had a female householder with no spouse or partner present and 20.8% had a male householder with no spouse or partner present. 32.9% of all households were non-families. 26.8% of all households were made up of individuals, 12.1% had someone living alone who was 65 years old or older.

The median age in the city was 37.3 years. 26.7% of the residents were under the age of 20; 5.3% were between the ages of 20 and 24; 28.4% were from 25 and 44; 21.6% were from 45 and 64; and 18.0% were 65 years of age or older. The gender makeup of the city was 50.6% male and 49.4% female.

=== 2010 census ===
As of the census of 2010, there were 374 people, 151 households, and 107 families residing in the city. The population density was 1,100.0 inhabitants per square mile (424.7/km^{2}). There were 158 housing units at an average density of 464.7 per square mile (179.4/km^{2}). The racial makeup of the city was 99.5% White and 0.5% from two or more races. Hispanic or Latino of any race were 1.1% of the population.

There were 151 households, of which 37.1% had children under the age of 18 living with them, 58.3% were married couples living together, 10.6% had a female householder with no husband present, 2.0% had a male householder with no wife present, and 29.1% were non-families. 25.8% of all households were made up of individuals, and 8.6% had someone living alone who was 65 years of age or older. The average household size was 2.48 and the average family size was 3.02.

The median age in the city was 35 years. 28.1% of residents were under the age of 18; 8.5% were between the ages of 18 and 24; 24.6% were from 25 to 44; 22.7% were from 45 to 64; and 16% were 65 years of age or older. The gender makeup of the city was 49.5% male and 50.5% female.

=== 2000 census ===
As of the census of 2000, there were 339 people, 132 households, and 97 families residing in the city. The population density was 1,191.8 inhabitants per square mile (460.2/km^{2}). There were 139 housing units at an average density of 488.7 per square mile (188.7/km^{2}). The racial makeup of the city was 100.00% White.

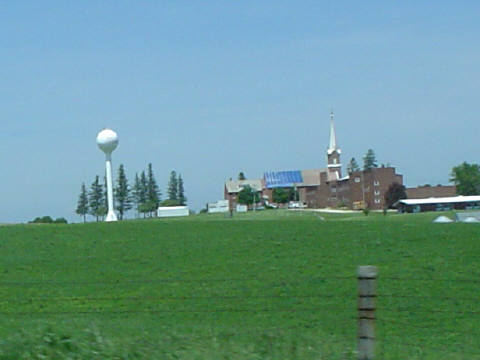
Holy Cross Catholic Church

There were 132 households, out of which 36.4% had children under the age of 18 living with them, 64.4% were married couples living together, 8.3% had a female householder with no husband present, and 25.8% were non-families. 22.7% of all households were made up of individuals, and 9.1% had someone living alone who was 65 years of age or older. The average household size was 2.57 and the average family size was 3.06.

In the city, the population was spread out, with 28.6% under the age of 18, 6.5% from 18 to 24, 28.3% from 25 to 44, 18.0% from 45 to 64, and 18.6% who were 65 years of age or older. The median age was 37 years. For every 100 females, there were 111.9 males. For every 100 females age 18 and over, there were 103.4 males.

As of 2000 the median income for a household was $38,125, and the median income for a family was $41,136. Males had a median income of $30,694 versus $18,333 for females. The per capita income for the city was $16,629. About 6.8% of families and 8.7% of the population were below the poverty line, including 12.9% of those under age 18 and 17.8% of those age 65 or over.

== Cemetery ==
The Holy Cross Catholic Cemetery is located just to the north of the Holy Cross Catholic Church. As of 2013, there were over 1700 buried in the cemetery.

== Education ==
Residents are within the Western Dubuque Community School District. Zoned schools include Epworth Elementary School in Epworth, Drexler Middle School in Farley, and Western Dubuque High School in Epworth.
