= Sageville, Iowa =

- City
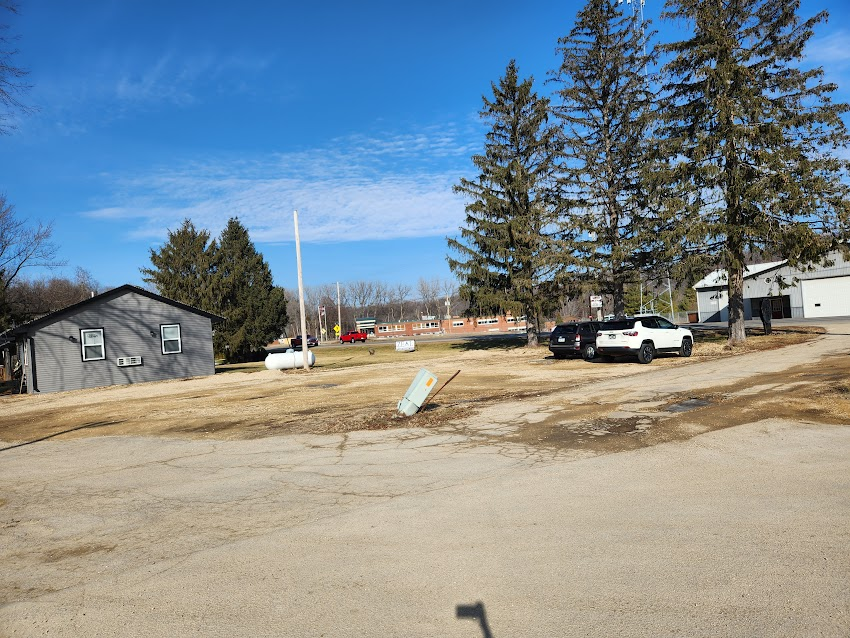
- Sageville on January 15th, 2023

- Location of Sageville, Iowa
- Coordinates: 42°32′58″N 90°42′23″W
- Country: United States
- State: Iowa
- County: Dubuque

Area
  - Total: 0.84 sq mi (2.17 km^{2})
  - Land: 0.84 sq mi (2.17 km^{2})
  - Water: 0 sq mi (0.00 km^{2})
- Elevation: 787 ft (240 m)

Population (2020)
  - Total: 95
  - Density: 113.5/sq mi (43.83/km^{2})
- Time zone: UTC-6 (Central (CST))
  - Summer (DST): UTC-5 (CDT)
- ZIP code: 52001
- Area code: 563
- FIPS code: 19-69690
- GNIS feature ID: 2396468

Sageville is a city in Dubuque County, Iowa, United States. The population was 95 at the time of the 2020 census, down from 203 in 2000.

== Geography ==
According to the United States Census Bureau, the city has a total area of 0.69 square miles (1.79 km^{2}), all land.

== Demographics ==
Historical populations
Year	Pop.	±%
1940	66	—
1950	118	+78.8%
1960	110	−6.8%
1970	338	+207.3%
1980	291	−13.9%
1990	288	−1.0%
2000	203	−29.5%
2010	122	−39.9%
2020	95	−22.1%
Source:"U.S. Census website". United States Census Bureau. and Iowa Data Center; Source: U.S. Decennial Census

=== 2020 census ===
As of the census of 2020, there were 95 people, 37 households, and 27 families residing in the city. The population density was 113.5 inhabitants per square mile (43.8/km^{2}). There were 44 housing units at an average density of 52.6 per square mile (20.3/km^{2}). The racial makeup of the city was 88.4% White, 0.0% Black or African American, 0.0% Native American, 1.1% Asian, 0.0% Pacific Islander, 0.0% from other races and 10.5% from two or more races. Hispanic or Latino persons of any race comprised 2.1% of the population.

Of the 37 households, 32.4% of which had children under the age of 18 living with them, 59.5% were married couples living together, 2.7% were cohabitating couples, 10.8% had a female householder with no spouse or partner present and 27.0% had a male householder with no spouse or partner present. 27.0% of all households were non-families. 27.0% of all households were made up of individuals, 16.2% had someone living alone who was 65 years old or older.

The median age in the city was 48.8 years. 20.0% of the residents were under the age of 20; 2.1% were between the ages of 20 and 24; 26.3% were from 25 and 44; 28.4% were from 45 and 64; and 23.2% were 65 years of age or older. The gender makeup of the city was 56.8% male and 43.2% female.

=== 2010 census ===
As of the census of 2010, there were 122 people, 55 households, and 37 families living in the city. The population density was 176.8 inhabitants per square mile (68.3/km^{2}). There were 57 housing units at an average density of 82.6 per square mile (31.9/km^{2}). The racial makeup of the city was 99.2% White and 0.8% Native American. Hispanic or Latino of any race were 0.8% of the population.

There were 55 households, of which 25.5% had children under the age of 18 living with them, 49.1% were married couples living together, 9.1% had a female householder with no husband present, 9.1% had a male householder with no wife present, and 32.7% were non-families. 27.3% of all households were made up of individuals, and 14.5% had someone living alone who was 65 years of age or older. The average household size was 2.22 and the average family size was 2.59.

The median age in the city was 45.7 years. 19.7% of residents were under the age of 18; 8.2% were between the ages of 18 and 24; 20.5% were from 25 to 44; 35.3% were from 45 to 64; and 16.4% were 65 years of age or older. The gender makeup of the city was 53.3% male and 46.7% female.

=== 2000 census ===
As of the census of 2000, there were 203 people, 85 households, and 54 families living in the city. The population density was 324.5 inhabitants per square mile (125.3/km^{2}). There were 95 housing units at an average density of 151.8 per square mile (58.6/km^{2}). The racial makeup of the city was 96.55% White, 0.99% African American, 0.49% Asian, 1.48% from other races, and 0.49% from two or more races. Hispanic or Latino of any race were 1.97% of the population.

There were 85 households, out of which 36.5% had children under the age of 18 living with them, 50.6% were married couples living together, 11.8% had a female householder with no husband present, and 35.3% were non-families. 29.4% of all households were made up of individuals, and 9.4% had someone living alone who was 65 years of age or older. The average household size was 2.39 and the average family size was 3.00.

In the city, the population was spread out, with 27.1% under the age of 18, 12.8% from 18 to 24, 34.0% from 25 to 44, 15.8% from 45 to 64, and 10.3% who were 65 years of age or older. The median age was 31 years. For every 100 females, there were 99.0 males. For every 100 females age 18 and over, there were 89.7 males.

The median income for a household in the city was $29,167, and the median income for a family was $31,667. Males had a median income of $24,375 versus $19,375 for females. The per capita income for the city was $13,700. About 8.6% of families and 14.8% of the population were below the poverty line, including 26.3% of those under the age of eighteen and 18.2% of those 65 or over.
