= Centralia, Iowa =

- City
- Location of Centralia, Iowa
- Coordinates: 42°28′20″N 90°50′10″W
- Country: United States
- State: Iowa
- County: Dubuque

Area
  - Total: 0.62 sq mi (1.61 km^{2})
  - Land: 0.62 sq mi (1.61 km^{2})
  - Water: 0 sq mi (0.00 km^{2})
- Elevation: 1,129 ft (344 m)

Population (2020)
  - Total: 116
  - Density: 186.9/sq mi (72.15/km^{2})
- Time zone: UTC-6 (Central (CST))
  - Summer (DST): UTC-5 (CDT)
- ZIP code: 52068
- Area code: 563
- FIPS code: 19-12630
- GNIS feature ID: 2393788

Centralia is a city in Dubuque County, Iowa, United States. It is part of the Dubuque, Iowa Metropolitan Statistical Area. The population was 116 at the 2020 census, up 15 persons since the 2000 census and down 18 from the 2010.

== History ==
Centralia was laid out about 1850.

== Geography ==
According to the United States Census Bureau, the city has a total area of 0.58 square miles (1.50 km^{2}), all of it land.

== Demographics ==
Historical populations
Year	Pop.	±%
1940	57	—
1950	78	+36.8%
1960	85	+9.0%
1970	105	+23.5%
1980	106	+1.0%
1990	123	+16.0%
2000	101	−17.9%
2010	134	+32.7%
2020	116	−13.4%
Source:"U.S. Census website". United States Census Bureau. and Iowa Data Center; Source: U.S. Decennial Census

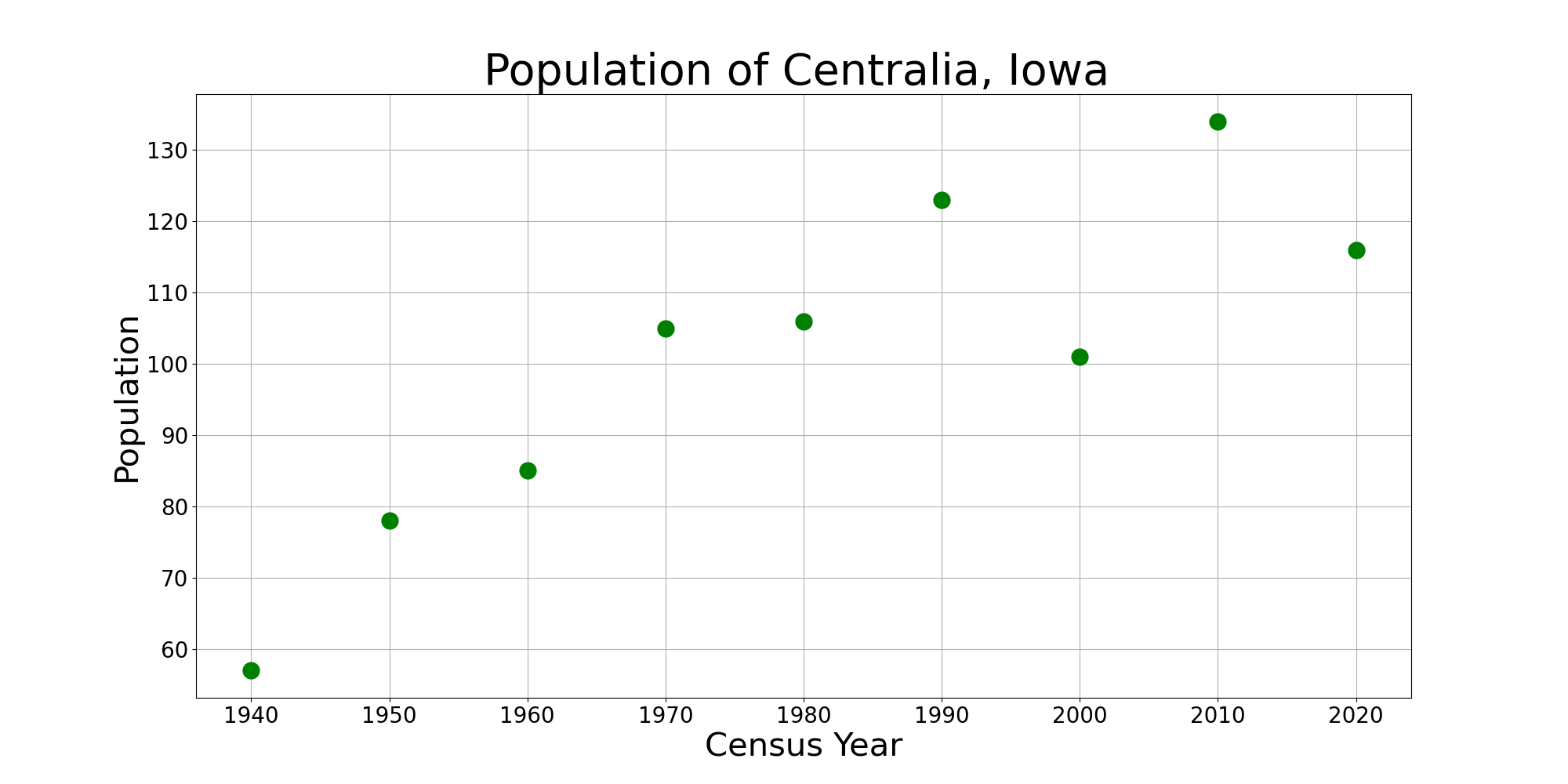
The population of Centralia, Iowa from US census data

=== 2020 census ===
As of the census of 2020, there were 116 people, 50 households, and 39 families residing in the city. The population density was 186.9 inhabitants per square mile (72.1/km^{2}). There were 50 housing units at an average density of 80.5 per square mile (31.1/km^{2}). The racial makeup of the city was 96.6% White, 0.0% Black or African American, 1.7% Native American, 0.0% Asian, 0.0% Pacific Islander, 0.9% from other races and 0.9% from two or more races. Hispanic or Latino persons of any race comprised 2.6% of the population.

Of the 50 households, 28.0% of which had children under the age of 18 living with them, 64.0% were married couples living together, 2.0% were cohabitating couples, 22.0% had a female householder with no spouse or partner present and 12.0% had a male householder with no spouse or partner present. 22.0% of all households were non-families. 20.0% of all households were made up of individuals, 8.0% had someone living alone who was 65 years old or older.

The median age in the city was 51.6 years. 19.8% of the residents were under the age of 20; 5.2% were between the ages of 20 and 24; 16.4% were from 25 and 44; 34.5% were from 45 and 64; and 24.1% were 65 years of age or older. The gender makeup of the city was 46.6% male and 53.4% female.

=== 2010 census ===
As of the census of 2010, there were 134 people, 52 households, and 39 families residing in the city. The population density was 231.0 inhabitants per square mile (89.2/km^{2}). There were 54 housing units at an average density of 93.1 per square mile (35.9/km^{2}). The racial makeup of the city was 98.5% White and 1.5% from two or more races.

There were 52 households, of which 34.6% had children under the age of 18 living with them, 55.8% were married couples living together, 15.4% had a female householder with no husband present, 3.8% had a male householder with no wife present, and 25.0% were non-families. 19.2% of all households were made up of individuals, and 1.9% had someone living alone who was 65 years of age or older. The average household size was 2.58 and the average family size was 2.87.

The median age in the city was 39.5 years. 20.9% of residents were under the age of 18; 7.4% were between the ages of 18 and 24; 28.4% were from 25 to 44; 33.6% were from 45 to 64; and 9.7% were 65 years of age or older. The gender makeup of the city was 50.0% male and 50.0% female.

=== 2000 census ===
As of the census of 2000, there were 101 people, 38 households, and 28 families residing in the city. The population density was 183.9 inhabitants per square mile (71.0/km^{2}). There were 40 housing units at an average density of 72.8 per square mile (28.1/km^{2}). The racial makeup of the city was 99.01% White and 0.99% Native American.

There were 38 households, out of which 39.5% had children under the age of 18 living with them, 71.1% were married couples living together, 2.6% had a female householder with no husband present, and 26.3% were non-families. 15.8% of all households were made up of individuals, and 7.9% had someone living alone who was 65 years of age or older. The average household size was 2.66 and the average family size was 3.00.

In the city, the population was spread out, with 30.7% under the age of 18, 4.0% from 18 to 24, 35.6% from 25 to 44, 19.8% from 45 to 64, and 9.9% who were 65 years of age or older. The median age was 32 years. For every 100 females, there were 114.9 males. For every 100 females age 18 and over, there were 94.4 males.

The median income for a household in the city was $43,333, and the median income for a family was $52,917. Males had a median income of $40,833 versus $18,125 for females. The per capita income for the city was $15,269. There were 6.5% of families and 13.8% of the population living below the poverty line, including 24.4% of those under 18 and 22.2% of those over 64.

== Education ==
Residents are within the Western Dubuque Community School District. Zoned schools include Peosta Elementary School in Peosta, Drexler Middle School in Farley, and Western Dubuque High School in Epworth.
