= Rickardsville, Iowa =

- City
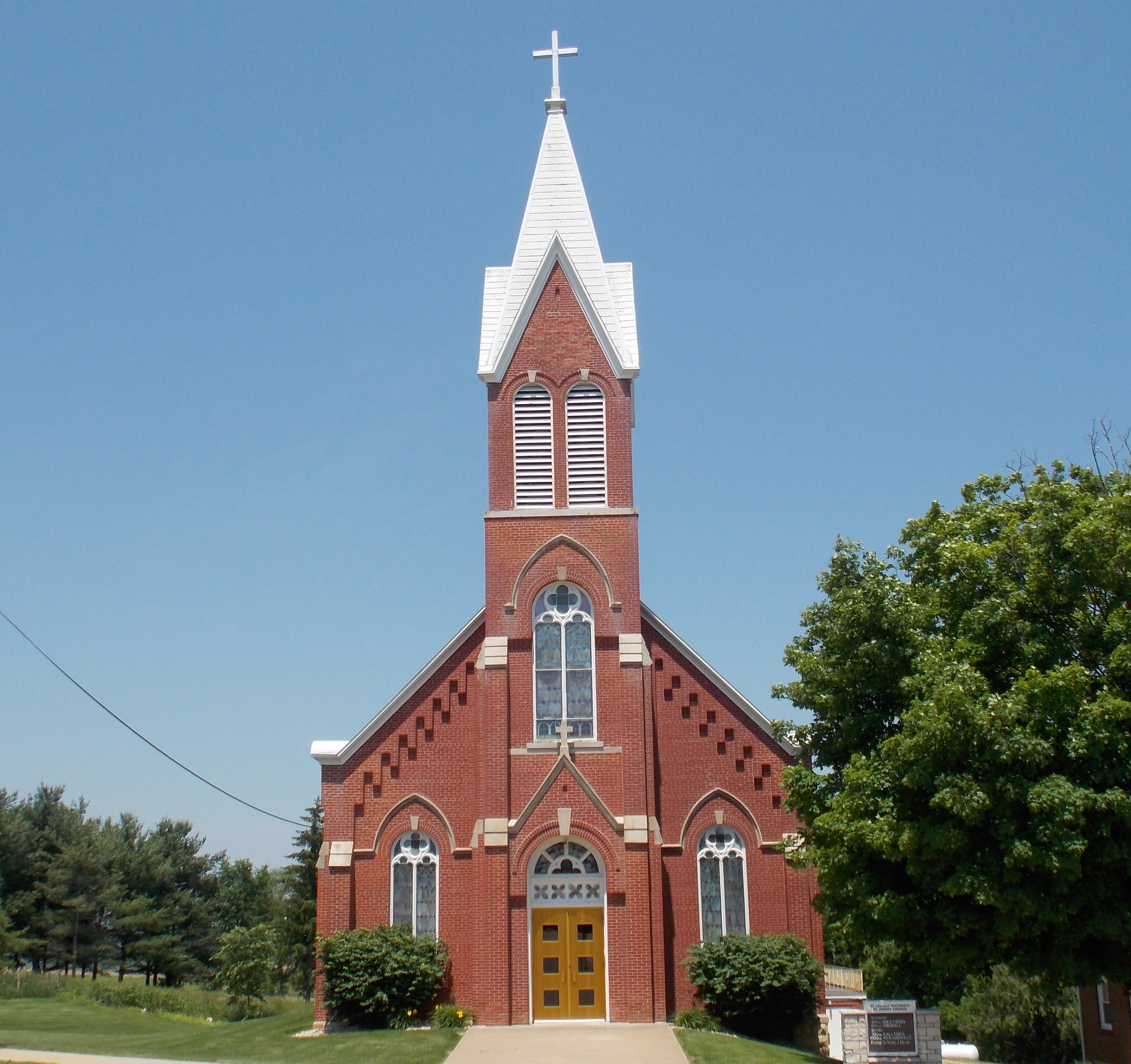
- St. Joseph's Catholic Church

- Location of Rickardsville, Iowa
- Coordinates: 42°34′48″N 90°52′18″W
- Country: United States
- State: Iowa
- County: Dubuque

Area
  - Total: 0.92 sq mi (2.38 km^{2})
  - Land: 0.92 sq mi (2.38 km^{2})
  - Water: 0 sq mi (0.00 km^{2})
- Elevation: 886 ft (270 m)

Population (2020)
  - Total: 202
  - Density: 219.8/sq mi (84.86/km^{2})
- Time zone: UTC-6 (Central (CST))
  - Summer (DST): UTC-5 (CDT)
- FIPS code: 19-66810
- GNIS feature ID: 2396372

Rickardsville is a city in Dubuque County, Iowa, United States. The population was 202 at the time of the 2020 census, up from 191 in 2000.

== Geography ==
According to the United States Census Bureau, the city has a total area of 0.90 square miles (2.33 km^{2}), all land.

== Demographics ==
Historical Populations
Year	Pop.	±%
1970	193	—
1980	215	+11.4%
1990	193	−10.2%
2000	191	−1.0%
2010	182	−4.7%
2020	202	+11.0%
Source:"U.S. Census website". United States Census Bureau. and Iowa Data Center; Source: U.S. Decennial Census

=== 2020 census ===
As of the census of 2020, there were 202 people, 80 households, and 61 families residing in the city. The population density was 220.6 inhabitants per square mile (85.2/km^{2}). There were 80 housing units at an average density of 87.4 per square mile (33.7/km^{2}). The racial makeup of the city was 97.0% White, 0.0% Black or African American, 0.0% Native American, 0.0% Asian, 0.0% Pacific Islander, 0.0% from other races and 3.0% from two or more races. Hispanic or Latino persons of any race comprised 0.5% of the population.

Of the 80 households, 37.5% of which had children under the age of 18 living with them, 63.8% were married couples living together, 7.5% were cohabitating couples, 7.5% had a female householder with no spouse or partner present and 21.2% had a male householder with no spouse or partner present. 23.8% of all households were non-families. 17.5% of all households were made up of individuals, 8.8% had someone living alone who was 65 years old or older.

The median age in the city was 39.1 years. 26.7% of the residents were under the age of 20; 4.5% were between the ages of 20 and 24; 26.2% were from 25 and 44; 21.8% were from 45 and 64; and 20.8% were 65 years of age or older. The gender makeup of the city was 51.0% male and 49.0% female.

=== 2010 census ===
As of the census of 2010, there were 182 people, 72 households, and 59 families living in the city. The population density was 202.2 inhabitants per square mile (78.1/km^{2}). There were 74 housing units at an average density of 82.2 per square mile (31.7/km^{2}). The racial makeup of the city was 98.4% White, 1.1% African American, and 0.5% from two or more races.

There were 72 households, of which 31.9% had children under the age of 18 living with them, 76.4% were married couples living together, 4.2% had a female householder with no husband present, 1.4% had a male householder with no wife present, and 18.1% were non-families. 15.3% of all households were made up of individuals, and 1.4% had someone living alone who was 65 years of age or older. The average household size was 2.53 and the average family size was 2.80.

The median age in the city was 39 years. 24.7% of residents were under the age of 18; 5.4% were between the ages of 18 and 24; 23.5% were from 25 to 44; 30.1% were from 45 to 64; and 15.9% were 65 years of age or older. The gender makeup of the city was 53.8% male and 46.2% female.

=== 2000 census ===
As of the census of 2000, there were 191 people, 71 households, and 58 families living in the city. The population density was 222.1 inhabitants per square mile (85.8/km^{2}). There were 71 housing units at an average density of 82.5 per square mile (31.9/km^{2}). The racial makeup of the city was 97.38% White, and 2.62% from two or more races. Hispanic or Latino of any race were 3.14% of the population.

There were 71 households, out of which 32.4% had children under the age of 18 living with them, 74.6% were married couples living together, 2.8% had a female householder with no husband present, and 18.3% were non-families. 16.9% of all households were made up of individuals, and 5.6% had someone living alone who was 65 years of age or older. The average household size was 2.69 and the average family size was 3.03.

In the city, the population was spread out, with 26.2% under the age of 18, 7.3% from 18 to 24, 22.0% from 25 to 44, 33.0% from 45 to 64, and 11.5% who were 65 years of age or older. The median age was 40 years. For every 100 females, there were 122.1 males. For every 100 females age 18 and over, there were 107.4 males.

The median income for a household in the city was $43,750, and the median income for a family was $49,750. Males had a median income of $40,000 versus $20,000 for females. The per capita income for the city was $22,768. About 3.2% of families and 3.2% of the population were below the poverty line, including none of those under the age of eighteen or sixty five or over.

== Education ==
Most residents are within the Western Dubuque Community School District. Zoned schools include Epworth Elementary School in Epworth, Drexler Middle School in Farley, and Western Dubuque High School in Epworth.
