= Bankston, Iowa =

- City
- Location of Bankston, Iowa
- Coordinates: 42°30′27″N 90°57′41″W
- Country: United States
- State: Iowa
- County: Dubuque

Area
  - Total: 0.27 sq mi (0.70 km^{2})
  - Land: 0.27 sq mi (0.70 km^{2})
  - Water: 0 sq mi (0.00 km^{2})
- Elevation: 1,122 ft (342 m)

Population (2020)
  - Total: 23
  - Density: 84.6/sq mi (32.68/km^{2})
- Time zone: UTC-6 (Central (CST))
  - Summer (DST): UTC-5 (CDT)
- ZIP code: 52045
- Area code: 563
- FIPS code: 19-04510
- GNIS feature ID: 2394059

Bankston is a city in Dubuque County, Iowa, United States. It is part of the 'Dubuque, Iowa Metropolitan Statistical Area'. The population was 23 at the 2020 census, down from 27 in 2000.

== Geography ==
According to the United States Census Bureau, the city has a total area of 0.29 square miles (0.75 km^{2}), all land.

== Demographics ==
Historical populations
| Year | Pop. | ±% |
|---|---|---|
| 1940 | 29 | — |
| 1950 | 40 | +37.9% |
| 1960 | 36 | −10.0% |
| 1970 | 28 | −22.2% |
| 1980 | 40 | +42.9% |
| 1990 | 35 | −12.5% |
| 2000 | 27 | −22.9% |
| 2010 | 25 | −7.4% |
| 2020 | 23 | −8.0% |
Source:"U.S. Census website". United States Census Bureau. and Iowa Data Center; Source: U.S. Decennial Census

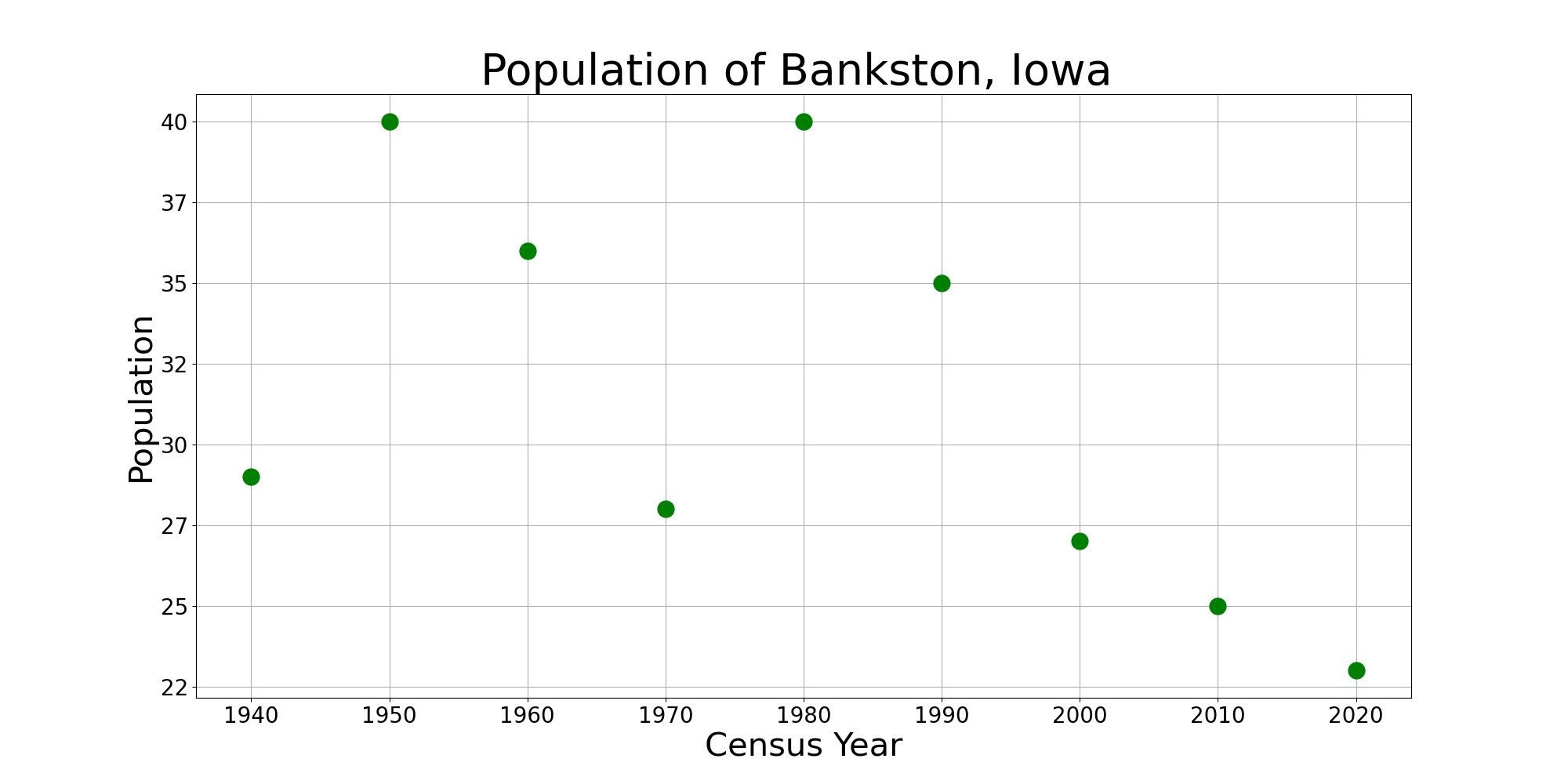
The population of Bankston, Iowa from US census data

=== 2020 census ===
As of the census of 2020, there were 23 people, 10 households, and 8 families residing in the city. The population density was 84.6 inhabitants per square mile (32.7/km^{2}). There were 10 housing units at an average density of 36.8 per square mile (14.2/km^{2}). The racial makeup of the city was 100.0% White, 0.0% Black or African American, 0.0% Native American, 0.0% Asian, 0.0% Pacific Islander, 0.0% from other races and 0.0% from two or more races. Hispanic or Latino persons of any race comprised 0.0% of the population.

Of the 10 households, 20.0% of which had children under the age of 18 living with them, 30.0% were married couples living together, 10.0% were cohabitating couples, 10.0% had a female householder with no spouse or partner present and 50.0% had a male householder with no spouse or partner present. 20.0% of all households were non-families. 20.0% of all households were made up of individuals, 0.0% had someone living alone who was 65 years old or older.

The median age in the city was 43.3 years. 17.4% of the residents were under the age of 20; 4.3% were between the ages of 20 and 24; 34.8% were from 25 and 44; 21.7% were from 45 and 64; and 21.7% were 65 years of age or older. The gender makeup of the city was 65.2% male and 34.8% female.

=== 2010 census ===
As of the census of 2010, there were 25 people, 9 households, and 6 families living in the city. The population density was 86.2 inhabitants per square mile (33.3/km^{2}). There were 9 housing units at an average density of 31.0 per square mile (12.0/km^{2}). The racial makeup of the city was 100.0% White.

There were 9 households, of which 44.4% had children under the age of 18 living with them, 55.6% were married couples living together, 11.1% had a female householder with no husband present, and 33.3% were non-families. 33.3% of all households were made up of individuals, and 22.2% had someone living alone who was 65 years of age or older. The average household size was 2.78 and the average family size was 3.67.

The median age in the city was 27.3 years. 36% of residents were under the age of 18; 4% were between the ages of 18 and 24; 24% were from 25 to 44; 28% were from 45 to 64; and 8% were 65 years of age or older. The gender makeup of the city was 56.0% male and 44.0% female.

=== 2000 census ===
As of the census of 2000, there were 27 people, 12 households, and 9 families living in the city. The population density was 98.2 inhabitants per square mile (37.9/km^{2}). There were 12 housing units at an average density of 43.6 per square mile (16.8/km^{2}). The racial makeup of the city was 100.00% White.

There were 12 households, out of which 33.3% had children under the age of 18 living with them, 50.0% were married couples living together, 16.7% had a female householder with no husband present, and 25.0% were non-families. 25.0% of all households were made up of individuals, and 8.3% had someone living alone who was 65 years of age or older. The average household size was 2.25 and the average family size was 2.56.

In the city, the population was spread out, with 25.9% under the age of 18, 14.8% from 18 to 24, 40.7% from 25 to 44, 7.4% from 45 to 64, and 11.1% who were 65 years of age or older. The median age was 36 years. For every 100 females, there were 125.0 males. For every 100 females age 18 and over, there were 122.2 males.

The median income for a household in the city was $18,750, and the median income for a family was $18,750. Males had a median income of $19,583 versus $38,750 for females. The per capita income for the city was $9,886. There were 30.0% of families and 41.4% of the population living below the poverty line, including 45.5% of under eighteens and none of those over 64.

== Education ==
Residents are within the Western Dubuque Community School District. Some residents are zoned to Epworth Elementary School in Epworth, while others are zoned to Drexler Elementary School in Farley. The zoned secondary schools are Drexler Middle School in Farley, and Western Dubuque High School in Epworth.

== Notable person ==
- Mike Elgin, offensive lineman for the Indianapolis Colts
