= Drexler Middle School =

Public middle school in Farley, Iowa

Coordinates: 42°26′40″N 91°0′6″W

Drexler Middle School is a public middle school in Farley, Iowa. It serves grades 6-8 and has a student population of around 650. It's part of the greater Western Dubuque Community School District (WDCSD), the largest district in Iowa, geographically. The school serves Farley, Luxemburg, New Vienna, and a section of Bankston.
