= Balltown, Iowa =

- City
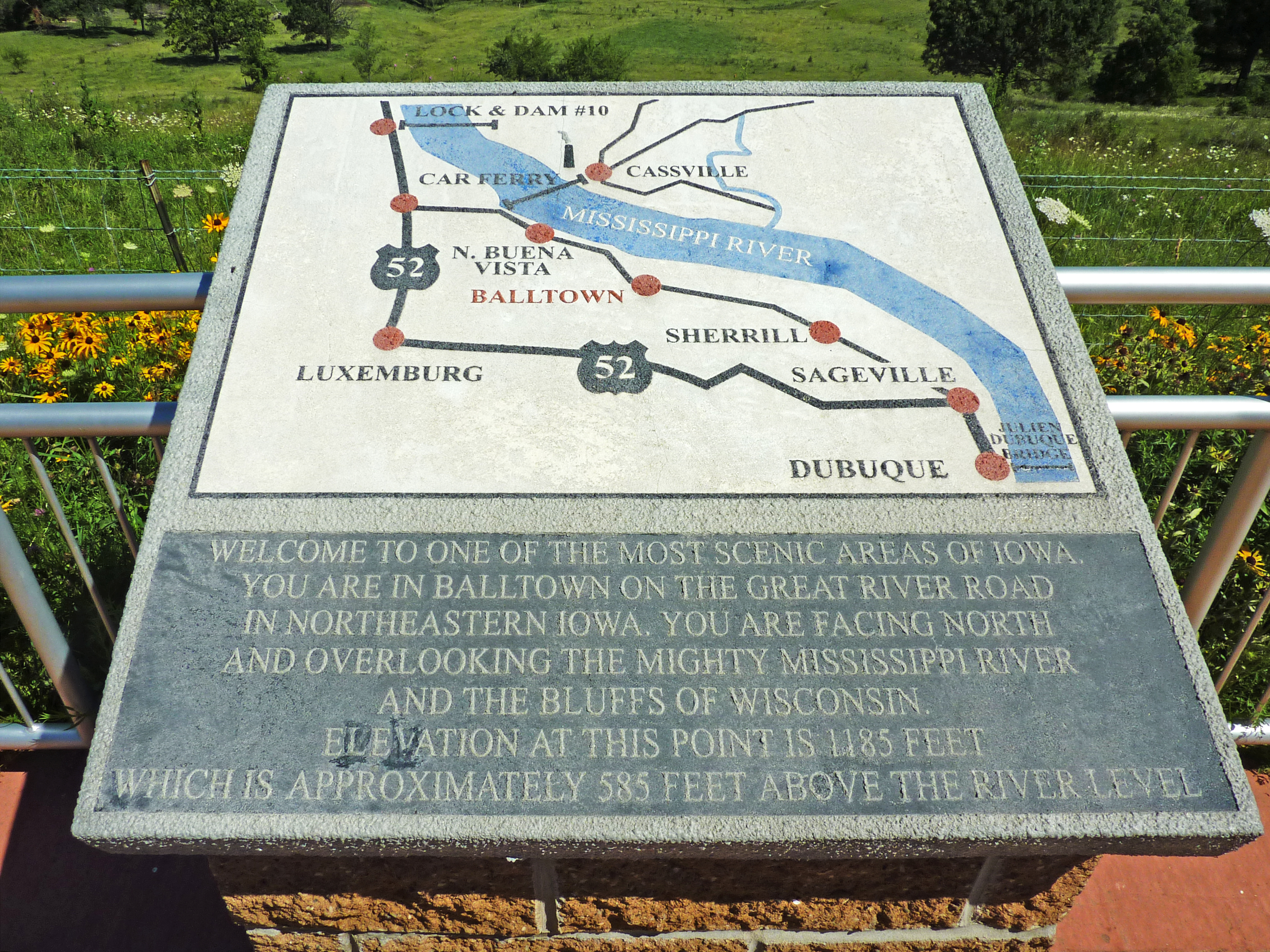
- Mississippi overlook sign in Balltown, Iowa

- Location of Balltown, Iowa
- Coordinates: 42°38′14″N 90°52′11″W
- Country: United States
- State: Iowa
- County: Dubuque

Government
  - Mayor: Sherri Sigwarth

Area
  - Total: 0.073 sq mi (0.19 km^{2})
  - Land: 0.073 sq mi (0.19 km^{2})
  - Water: 0 sq mi (0.00 km^{2})
- Elevation: 1,221 ft (372 m)

Population (2020)
  - Total: 79
  - Density: 1,103.5/sq mi (426.06/km^{2})
- Time zone: UTC-6 (Central (CST))
  - Summer (DST): UTC-5 (CDT)
- ZIP code: 52073
- Area code: 563
- FIPS code: 19-04375
- GNIS feature ID: 2394056

Balltown is a city in Dubuque County, Iowa, United States. It is part of the Dubuque, Iowa Metropolitan Statistical Area. The population was 79 at the 2020 census, up from 73 in 2000. Balltown is home to Breitbach's Country Dining, Iowa's oldest restaurant and bar, which was founded in 1852 and twice rebuilt by the community, following its destruction by fire in 2007 and 2008.

== Geography ==
According to the United States Census Bureau, the city has a total area of 0.09 square miles (0.23 km^{2}), all land.

== History ==
Balltown was named for John Ball, an early settler said to have lived on a Mississippi river island before 1850.

== Demographics ==
Historical populations
Year	Pop.	±%
1940	56	—
1950	49	−12.5%
1960	43	−12.2%
1970	79	+83.7%
1980	106	+34.2%
1990	74	−30.2%
2000	73	−1.4%
2010	68	−6.8%
2020	79	+16.2%
Source:"U.S. Census website". United States Census Bureau. and Iowa Data Center; Source: U.S. Decennial Census

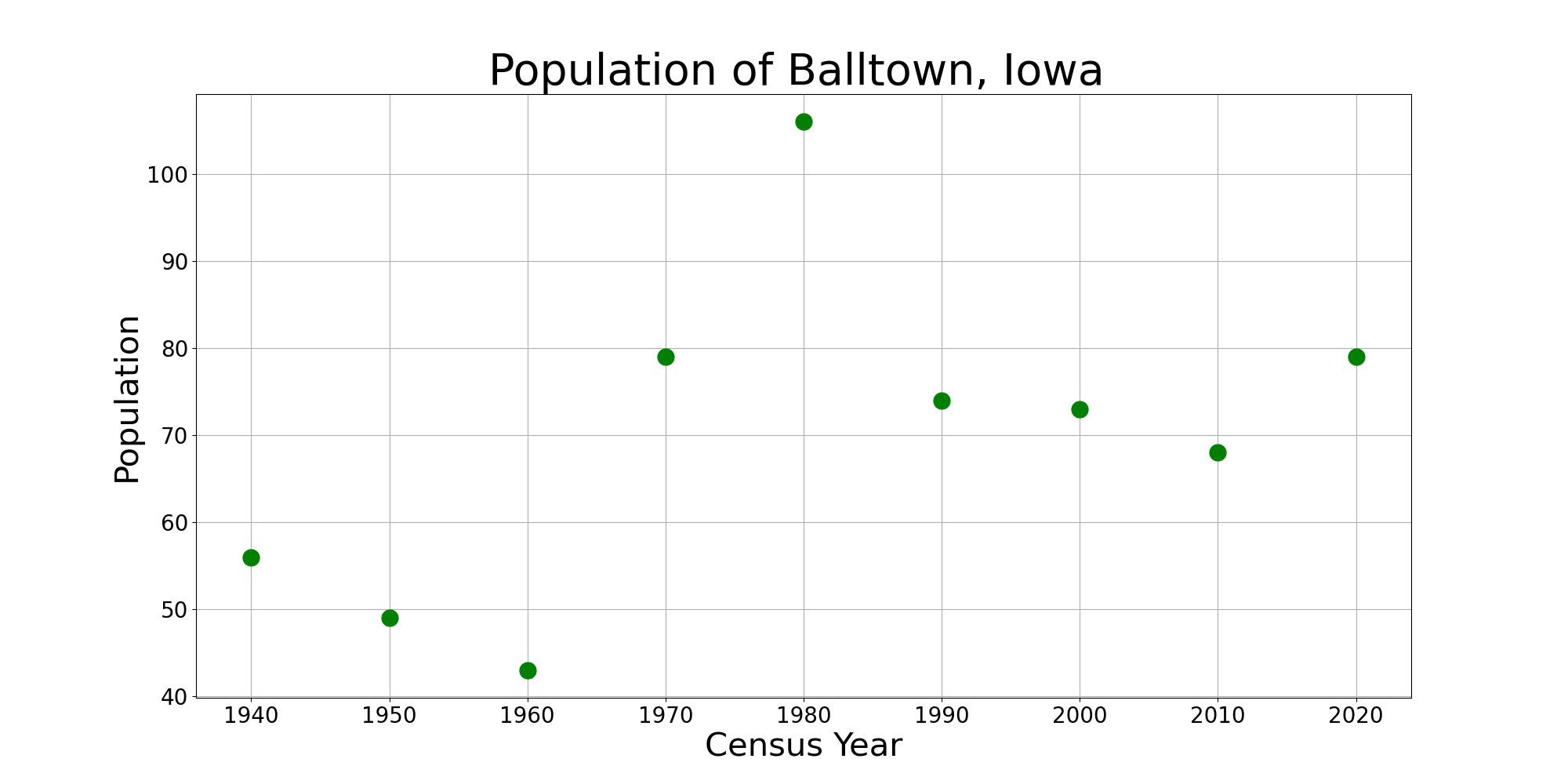
The population of Balltown, Iowa from US census data

=== 2020 census ===
As of the census of 2020, there were 79 people, 33 households, and 25 families residing in the city. The population density was 1,103.5 inhabitants per square mile (426.1/km^{2}). There were 33 housing units at an average density of 461.0 per square mile (178.0/km^{2}). The racial makeup of the city was 96.2% White, 1.3% Black or African American, 0.0% Native American, 0.0% Asian, 0.0% Pacific Islander, 0.0% from other races and 2.5% from two or more races. Hispanic or Latino persons of any race comprised 1.3% of the population.

Of the 33 households, 48.5% of which had children under the age of 18 living with them, 60.6% were married couples living together, 6.1% were cohabitating couples, 15.2% had a female householder with no spouse or partner present and 18.2% had a male householder with no spouse or partner present. 24.2% of all households were non-families. 21.2% of all households were made up of individuals, 15.2% had someone living alone who was 65 years old or older.

The median age in the city was 38.8 years. 29.1% of the residents were under the age of 20; 2.5% were between the ages of 20 and 24; 32.9% were from 25 and 44; 13.9% were from 45 and 64; and 21.5% were 65 years of age or older. The gender makeup of the city was 49.4% male and 50.6% female.

=== 2010 census ===
As of the census of 2010, there were 68 people, 31 households, and 21 families living in the city. The population density was 755.6 inhabitants per square mile (291.7/km^{2}). There were 33 housing units at an average density of 366.7 per square mile (141.6/km^{2}). The racial makeup of the city was 98.5% White and 1.5% from two or more races.

There were 31 households, of which 19.4% had children under the age of 18 living with them, 67.7% were married couples living together, and 32.3% were non-families. 29.0% of all households were made up of individuals, and 22.6% had someone living alone who was 65 years of age or older. The average household size was 2.19 and the average family size was 2.67.

The median age in the city was 47 years. 17.6% of residents were under the age of 18; 4.4% were between the ages of 18 and 24; 25% were from 25 to 44; 22% were from 45 to 64; and 30.9% were 65 years of age or older. The gender makeup of the city was 50.0% male and 50.0% female.

=== 2000 census ===
As of the census of 2000, there were 73 people, 29 households, and 22 families living in the city. The population density was 1,233.4 inhabitants per square mile (476.2/km^{2}). There were 31 housing units at an average density of 523.8 per square mile (202.2/km^{2}). The racial makeup of the city was 91.78% White and 8.22% African American. Hispanic or Latino of any race were 1.37% of the population.

There were 29 households, out of which 17.2% had children under the age of 18 living with them, 62.1% were married couples living together, 10.3% had a female householder with no husband present, and 24.1% were non-families. 24.1% of all households were made up of individuals, and 10.3% had someone living alone who was 65 years of age or older. The average household size was 2.52 and the average family size was 2.91.

19.2% are under the age of 18, 15.1% from 18 to 24, 15.1% from 25 to 44, 30.1% from 45 to 64, and 20.5% who were 65 years of age or older. The median age was 50 years. For every 100 females, there were 135.5 males. For every 100 females age 18 and over, there were 118.5 males.

The median income for a household in the city was $40,625, and the median income for a family was $49,063. Males had a median income of $36,250 versus $16,875 for females. The per capita income for the city was $24,241. None of the population and none of the families were below the poverty line.

== Education ==
Residents are within the Western Dubuque Community School District. Zoned schools include Epworth Elementary School in Epworth, Drexler Middle School in Farley, and Western Dubuque High School in Epworth.
