= Fillmore, Iowa =

- Unincorporated community
- Location within Iowa
- Coordinates: 42°19′09″N 90°55′00″W
- Country: United States
- State: Iowa
- County: Dubuque
- Elevation: 833 ft (254 m)
- Time zone: UTC-6 (Central (CST))
  - Summer (DST): UTC-5 (CDT)
- Area code: 563
- GNIS feature ID: 456587

Fillmore is an unincorporated community in Dubuque County, Iowa, United States. The community is located along U.S. Route 151, 5.2 miles (8.4 km) east-northeast of Cascade.

== History ==
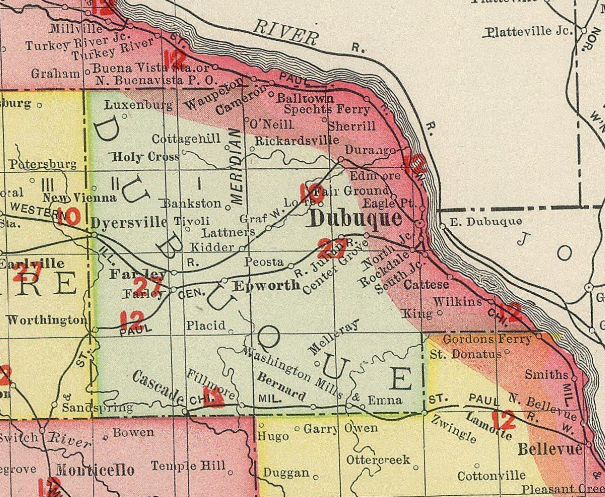
Fillmore in Dubuque County, Iowa, in 1903

Fillmore's population was 30 in 1887, and was 115 in 1902. The population was 20 in 1940.

== Education ==
Residents are zoned to the Western Dubuque Community School District. They are assigned to Cascade Elementary School and Cascade Junior/Senior High School, both in Cascade.
