= Bernard, Iowa =

- City
- Location of Bernard, Iowa
- Coordinates: 42°18′48″N 90°49′54″W
- Country: United States
- State: Iowa
- County: Dubuque

Area
  - Total: 0.093 sq mi (0.24 km^{2})
  - Land: 0.093 sq mi (0.24 km^{2})
  - Water: 0 sq mi (0.00 km^{2})
- Elevation: 929 ft (283 m)

Population (2020)
  - Total: 114
  - Density: 1,243.5/sq mi (480.13/km^{2})
- Time zone: UTC-6 (Central (CST))
  - Summer (DST): UTC-5 (CDT)
- ZIP code: 52032
- Area code: 563
- FIPS code: 19-06085
- GNIS feature ID: 2394148

Bernard is a city in Dubuque County, Iowa, United States. The population was 114 in the 2020 census, an increase from the 97 population in 2000. Bernard is part of the Dubuque, Iowa Metropolitan Statistical Area.

== Geography ==
According to the United States Census Bureau, the city has a total area of 0.11 square miles (0.28 km^{2}), all land.

== Demographics ==
Historical population
Census	Pop.	Note	%±
1900	113		—
1910	95		−15.9%
1920	105		10.5%
1930	123		17.1%
1940	111		−9.8%
1950	149		34.2%
1960	173		16.1%
1970	148		−14.5%
1980	130		−12.2%
1990	123		−5.4%
2000	97		−21.1%
2010	112		15.5%
2020	114		1.8%
U.S. Decennial Census

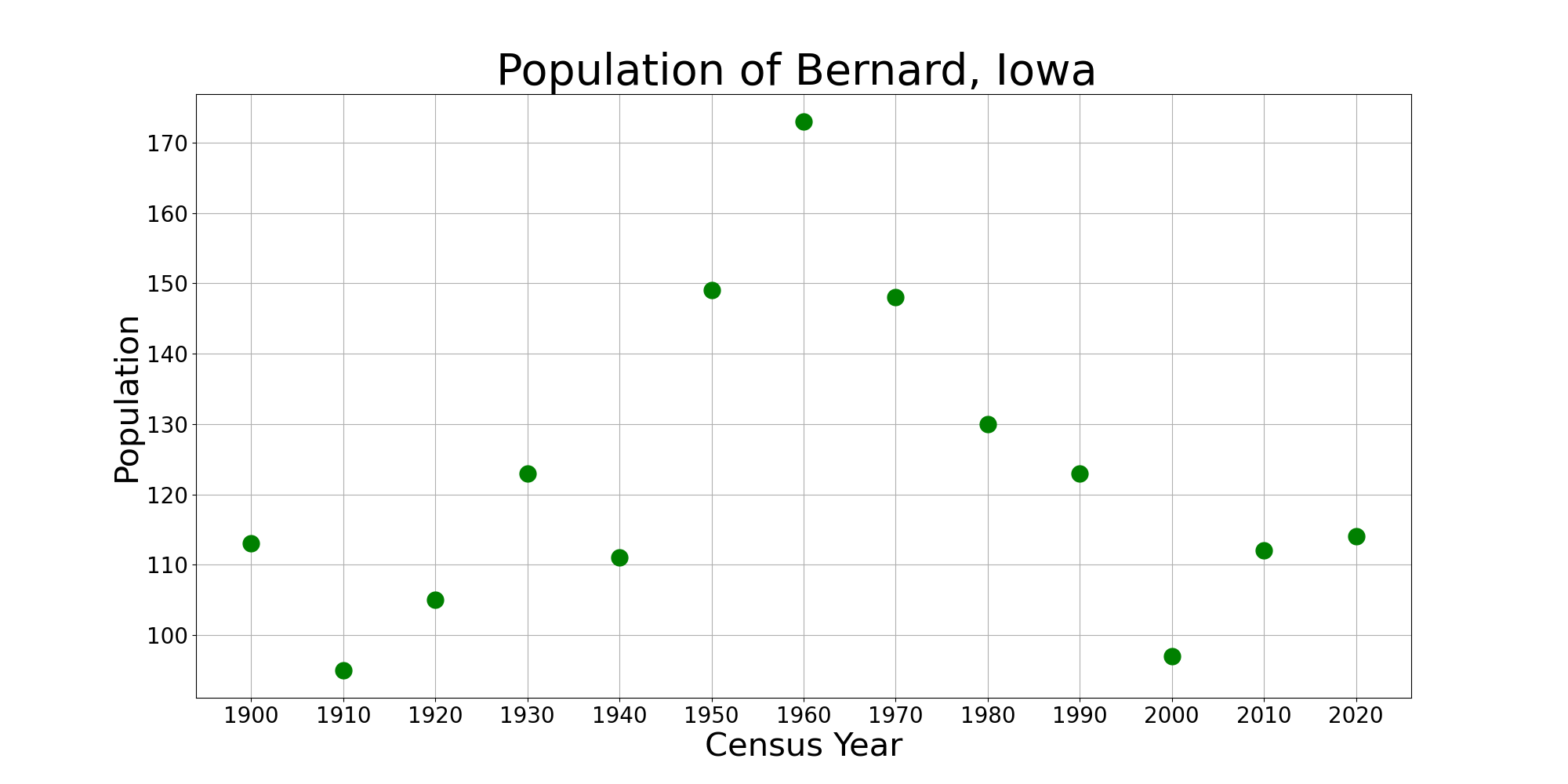
The population of Bernard, Iowa from US census data

=== 2020 census ===
As of the census of 2020, there were 114 people, 50 households, and 32 families residing in the city. The population density was 1,243.5 inhabitants per square mile (480.1/km^{2}). There were 56 housing units at an average density of 610.9 per square mile (235.9/km^{2}). The racial makeup of the city was 98.2% White, 0.9% Black or African American, 0.0% Native American, 0.0% Asian, 0.0% Pacific Islander, 0.9% from other races and 0.0% from two or more races. Hispanic or Latino persons of any race comprised 9.6% of the population.

Of the 50 households, 32.0% of which had children under the age of 18 living with them, 46.0% were married couples living together, 6.0% were cohabitating couples, 18.0% had a female householder with no spouse or partner present and 30.0% had a male householder with no spouse or partner present. 36.0% of all households were non-families. 28.0% of all households were made up of individuals, 4.0% had someone living alone who was 65 years old or older.

The median age in the city was 32.0 years. 22.8% of the residents were under the age of 20; 2.6% were between the ages of 20 and 24; 43.9% were from 25 and 44; 20.2% were from 45 and 64; and 10.5% were 65 years of age or older. The gender makeup of the city was 48.2% male and 51.8% female.

=== 2010 census ===
As of the census of 2010, there were 112 people, 50 households, and 27 families living in the city. The population density was 1,018.2 inhabitants per square mile (393.1/km^{2}). There were 56 housing units at an average density of 509.1 per square mile (196.6/km^{2}). The racial makeup of the city was 100.0% White.

There were 50 households, of which 26.0% had children under the age of 18 living with them, 44.0% were married couples living together, 10.0% had a female householder with no husband present, and 46.0% were non-families. 40.0% of all households were made up of individuals, and 18% had someone living alone who was 65 years of age or older. The average household size was 2.24 and the average family size was 3.07.

The median age in the city was 32.5 years. 22.3% of residents were under the age of 18; 10.8% were between the ages of 18 and 24; 27.8% were from 25 to 44; 20.6% were from 45 to 64; and 18.8% were 65 years of age or older. The gender makeup of the city was 51.8% male and 48.2% female.

=== 2000 census ===
As of the census of 2000, there were 97 people, 46 households, and 25 families living in the city. The population density was 1,053.5 inhabitants per square mile (406.8/km^{2}). There were 48 housing units at an average density of 521.3 per square mile (201.3/km^{2}). The racial makeup of the city was 100.0% White.

There were 46 households, out of which 23.9% had children under the age of 18 living with them, 47.8% were married couples living together, 6.5% had a female householder with no husband present, and 43.5% were non-families. 37.0% of all households were made up of individuals, and 19.6% had someone living alone who was 65 years of age or older. The average household size was 2.11 and the average family size was 2.85.

In the city, the population was spread out, with 19.6% under the age of 18, 7.2% from 18 to 24, 32.0% from 25 to 44, 19.6% from 45 to 64, and 21.6% who were 65 years of age or older. The median age was 40 years. For every 100 females, there were 115.6 males. For every 100 females age 18 and over, there were 116.7 males.

The median income for a household in the city was $30,000, and the median income for a family was $41,875. Males had a median income of $23,125 versus $19,167 for females. The per capita income for the city was $32,671. There were 7.4% of families and 6.1% of the population living below the poverty line, including no under eighteens and 9.5% of those over 64.

== Education ==
Bernard is within the Western Dubuque Community School District. Zoned schools include Cascade Elementary School, and Cascade Junior-Senior High School, both in Cascade.

It was previously served by Bernard Elementary School, which was located next to the Bernard Commercial Club Park, on a 10-acre (4.0 ha) plot of land. It opened in 1960, had its current building open in 1963, and received an addition in 1967. Family sizes in the area decreased, and as years passed the enrollment grew smaller and smaller. By 2017 the school was sharing employees with Cascade Elementary, and was required to send students in kindergarten and the second grade to Cascade Elementary as the numbers of students from those grades were too small; Bernard Elementary had a total of 31 students. The district stated that the yearly cost of operating the school per student was $14,000. In February 2017 four members of the school board voted to close the school while Mark Knuth, the president of the school board, chose to abstain from voting. Students were reassigned to Cascade Elementary.

== Notable people ==
- Paul Vincent Donovan, (1924–2011) Roman Catholic bishop
- Justin Albert Driscoll, (1920–1984) Roman Catholic bishop
