= Temple Hill, Iowa =

- Unincorporated community
- Location within Iowa Location within the United States
- Coordinates: 42°13′33″N 90°58′35″W
- Country: United States
- State: Iowa
- County: Jones
- Elevation: 922 ft (281 m)
- Time zone: UTC-6 (Central (CST))
  - Summer (DST): UTC-5 (CDT)
- Area code: 319
- GNIS feature ID: 464775

Temple Hill is an unincorporated community in Jones County, Iowa, United States. Temple Hill is located on Iowa Highway 136, south of Cascade and north of Onslow.

== Education ==
Residents are zoned to the Western Dubuque Community School District. They are assigned to Cascade Elementary School and Cascade Junior/Senior High School, both in Cascade.
