= Western Dubuque High School =

Public secondary school in Epworth, Iowa, United States

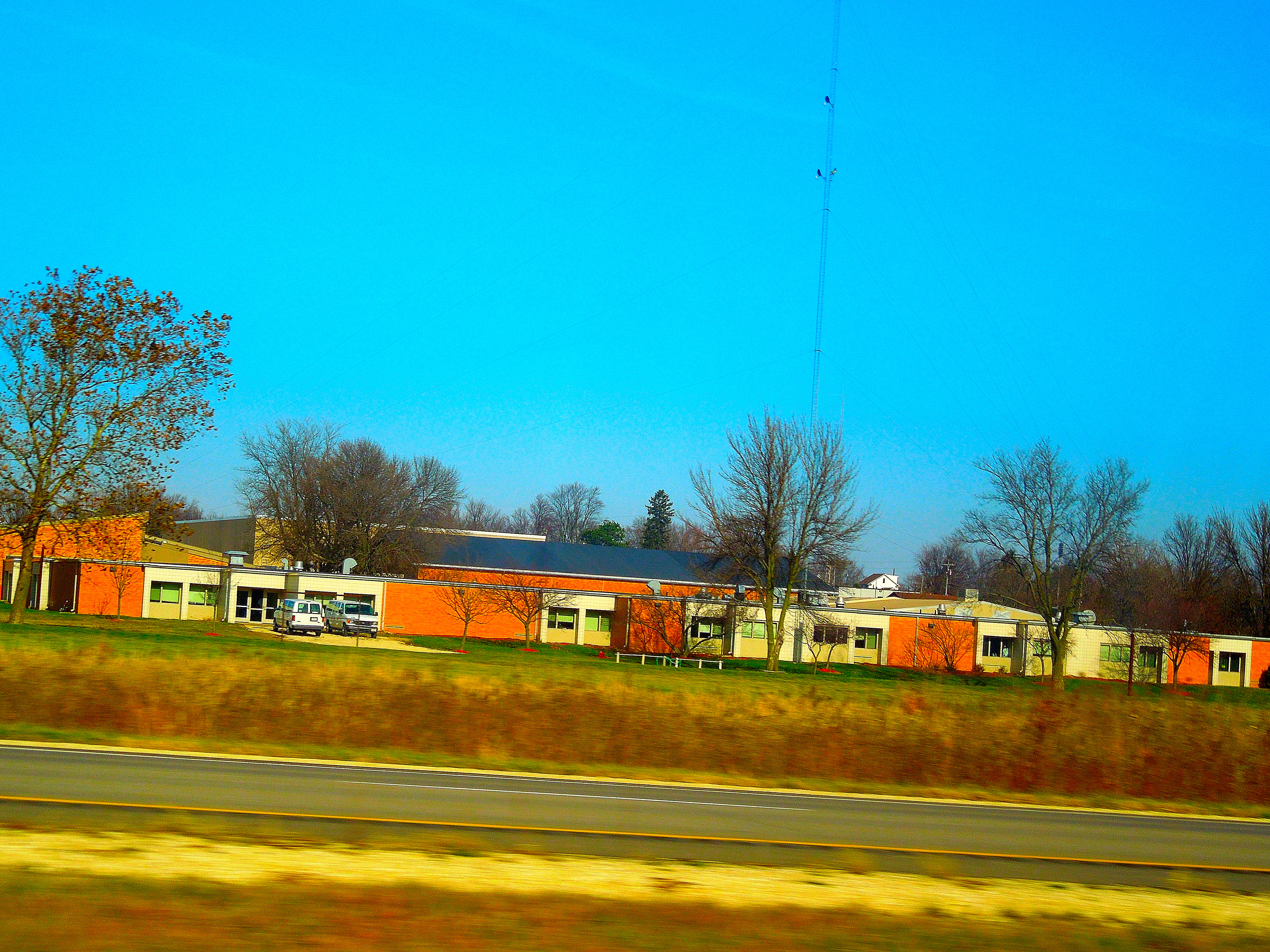

Location
- 302 5th Avenue SW; Epworth, Iowa 52045; 42.442°N 90.943°W

Information
- Type: Public
- Established: 1962
- School district: Western Dubuque Community School District
- Superintendent: Dan Butler
- Principal: Ethan Lensch
- Staff: 56.05
- Grades: 9-12
- Enrollment: 896 (2025-26)
- Student to teacher ratio: 16.00
- Campus: Rural
- Colors: Red, Black, & White
- Athletics conference: Mississippi Valley Conference
- Mascot: Bruiser the Bobcat
- Team name: Bobcats
- Website: https://www.wdbqschools.org/o/wdhse

Western Dubuque High School (commonly West Dubuque, West Dub, WDHS, or WD) is a public high school located in Epworth, Iowa. It is one of two high schools in the Western Dubuque Community School District. The school's mascot is the Bobcat, and it competes in the Mississippi Valley Conference.

== History ==
The campus was built in 1962 and the first class graduated the next year.

== Campus ==
Western Dubuque High School is located in Epworth, Iowa, near Divine Word College. The one-story school building was built in 1962, and the campus includes its own football field. The school recently added a new addition containing two new gyms, a large commons area, two boys and two girls locker rooms, as well as a state-of-the-art wrestling room and weight room. During the 2014-2015 school year, the school had welcomed a new office and a new auditorium. In the 2015-2016 school year, an auto mechanics and metalworking shop were completed and open to the public in the 2016-2017 school year. Plans to build a new carpentry shop and services garage are in the works as of the 2018-2019 school year, but there is no estimate on when they will be finished.

== Students ==
In the 2009-2010 school year, Western Dubuque High School enrolled 747 students. Of those, 713 (95%) were White, 14 (2%) were Black, 2 (0.27%) were Asian, and none were American Indian. 11 (1%) students were Hispanic, and may be of any race. Additionally, 372 (49.8%) were male, and 375 (50.2%) were female.

In the 2025–2026 school year, Western Dubuque High School enrolled 897 students and ranked second among high schools in the Dubuque, IA metropolitan area.

== Communities served ==
Areas within the school's attendance zone include: Balltown, Bankston, Centralia, Dyersville, Epworth, Farley, Luxemburg, Holy Cross, New Vienna, Peosta, almost all of Rickardsville, and Worthington. All are completely or partially in Dubuque County. It also serves the unincorporated area of Petersburg.

== Athletics ==
The Bobcats participate in the Mississippi Valley Conference in the following sports:

=== Girls ===
- Cross Country
- Volleyball-2021 4A State Champions
- Basketball-1987 State Champions (5v5)
- Track
- Golf
- Soccer
- Softball-2021 4A State Champions
- Tennis
- Bowling
- Wrestling

=== Boys ===
- Cross Country
- Football–2001 (3A) and 2019 (4A) State Champions
- Basketball–2001 State Champions (3A)
- Wrestling
- Track-2024 3A State Champions
- Golf
- Soccer
- Baseball-2022 and 2023 Class 3A State Champions
- Tennis
- Bowling – 2011 (1A), 2012 (1A), 2018 (2A) State Team Champions

== Arts ==
=== Band ===
The Bobcat Marching Band has made many national appearances, including at the Macy's Thanksgiving Day Parade, the Tournament of Roses Parade, the Cotton Bowl Parade, two Presidential Inauguration parades, the Indianapolis 500 parade, and the 2011 Allstate Sugar Bowl in New Orleans. The band consists of 50+ members and has won numerous division I ratings at state as well as best drumline, flags, hornline, and drum majors. As well as marching band, Western Dubuque High School offers concert band and jazz band, both in which have received division I at state contest.

=== Choir ===
Western Dubuque High School has three choirs. The concert choir offers more literature pieces and has many performances throughout the school year. There are two show choirs, all female junior varsity group called the "Aristocats" and "5th Avenue", a competitive co-ed varsity show choir group that consist of 42 singer/dancers, a band, and a crew. "5th Avenue" competes at the 3A level in Iowa, Wisconsin, Illinois, and Minnesota. They perform several competitions per school year along with their annual Halloween Hoot. Both "5th Avenue" and "Aristocats" host a show choir invitational called the MAIN EVENT which hosts many of the top show choir groups in the Midwest and has been well known ever since it started.

== Notable alumni ==
- Mike Elgin-Class of 2002. Former NFL player

== See also ==
- Epworth, Iowa
- List of high schools in Iowa
- Western Dubuque Community School District
