= Cascade Junior/Senior High School =

Public secondary school in Cascade, Iowa, United States

Location
- 505 Johnson Street NW; Cascade, Iowa 52033; United States
- 42.300675°N 91.019°W

Information
- Type: Public high school
- Established: 1976
- School district: Western Dubuque Community School District
- Principal: Ryan Fritz
- Teaching staff: 31.53 (FTE)
- Grades: 7–12
- Enrollment: 381 (2023–2024)
- Student to teacher ratio: 12.08
- Colors: Navy, Gold, and White
- Team name: Cougars
- Website: www.wdbqschools.org/o/wdhse

Cascade Junior/Senior High School, also known as Cascade High School (CHS) or Cascade Jr/Sr High School of W.D., is a rural public high school in Cascade, Iowa. A part of the Western Dubuque Community School District, it serves grades 7–12. As of 2019, it enrolled 360 students. The communities of Cascade, Bernard, Fillmore, and Temple Hill are in its attendance boundary.

== Athletics ==
The Cougars compete in the River Valley Conference in the following sports:

- Baseball
- Bowling
- Basketball (boys and girls)
  - Boys 2018 State Champions
  - Girls 2018 State Champions
- Cross Country (boys and girls)
  - Boys' 3-time Class 2A State Champions (1983, 1985, 1986)
  - Girls' 8-time Class 2A State Champions (1983, 1984, 1985, 1987, 1988, 1990, 1991, 2015)
- Football
- Golf (boys and girls)
- Soccer (boys and girls)
- Softball
- Track and Field (boys and girls)
  - Girls' 2012 Class 2A State Champions
- Volleyball
- Wrestling

== Notable alumni ==
- Colin Rea-2009, Major League Baseball pitcher

== See also ==
- List of high schools in Iowa
