= William Menster =

United States Naval chaplain

- Born: February 10, 1913; Cascade, Iowa
- Died: April 14, 2007 (aged 94); Dubuque, Iowa
- Military career
- Allegiance: United States of America
- Branch: United States Navy
- Service years: 1942–1967
- Rank: Commander
- Conflicts: World War II
- Church: Catholic (Latin Church)

Orders
- Ordination: June 11, 1938

Father William J. Menster (February 10, 1913 – April 14, 2007) was a Roman Catholic priest of the Archdiocese of Dubuque. Menster was best known as the first member of the clergy to visit Antarctica.

== Early life ==
Born in Cascade, Iowa, Menster was the son of Joseph and Frances Menster. He attended St. Martin's School in Cascade and Loras College in Dubuque. Menster studied for the priesthood at St. Mary's Seminary in Cincinnati, Ohio. Menster was ordained a priest on June 11, 1938. Menster was then assigned to be the associate pastor of Sacred Heart Church in Waterloo, Iowa.

== Active military service ==
Menster enlisted in the United States Naval Reserve in 1942. After completing chaplain's school, Menster first served as chaplain at Naval Base San Diego before being assigned to various Navy bomber stations in the Pacific theater.

Following the Second World War, Menster briefly served at Naval Air Station Miami before being assigned to Operation Highjump – Admiral Richard Byrd's fourth expedition to Antarctica – in 1946. He was assigned to the USS Mount Olympus, and was the only chaplain in the five ship fleet. Upon landing, he became the first Catholic priest ever to set foot on Antarctica. On January 26, 1947, he led the first ever religious service of any denomination on the continent with a Mass offered for world peace. Throughout the expedition, Menster said Mass daily and also conducted ecumenical services for the 2,000 men of a variety of religious faiths.

Two members of the expedition went on to enter seminary studies to become priests. Bill Beye was baptized by Menster on Christmas Eve, 1946, aboard the ship – believed to be the first baptism in the Antarctic Circle. He entered the Franciscans in Santa Barbara, California. Thomas Donnelley, who was the altar server for the historic Mass, later entered Maryknoll Seminary.

Menster presented the missal that he used on the expedition to Loras College.

== Later years ==
After returning to the United States in 1947, Menster returned to reserve duty and was assigned to Saint Mary's Church in Corwith, Iowa. He also served as the national chaplain of the AMVETS organization. Menster was named the director of Catholic Charities in 1948, and held this posting until 1958. He wrote the book Strong Men South as a chronicle of his adventures in 1949. He later traveled to Hollywood where he served as a technical consultant when ABC made a documentary about Antarctica named The Secret Land, which was based in part on his book. In 1950 Menster and his father were granted a private audience with Pope Pius XII. Menster was assigned to be the pastor of St. Patrick's Church in, Monona, St. Mary's in Waverly, and St. John's in Clarion in 1958. While there, he was the chaplain of the U.S. Naval Training Center in Dubuque. By 1968, Menster had attained the rank of Commander.

Menster was named the pastor of the St. Donatus parish in 1978. After Menster retired from active ministry, he lived in Dubuque. At the time of his death on April 14, 2007, Menster was the oldest living priest in the Archdiocese of Dubuque. His funeral was at St. Raphael's Cathedral.

== Legacy ==
Menster Ledge, a geological feature in Antarctica, is named after Menster in his capacity as chaplain, commander, USN of the flagship Mount Olympus.

== See also ==
- Strong Men South
