= Western Dubuque Community School District =

Public school district in Farley, Iowa, United States

Coordinates: 42.439578°N 91.010584°W

Location
- Farley, Iowa Dubuque, Delaware, Jones, Jackson, and Clayton counties United States
- Coordinates: 42.439578, -91.010584

District information
- Type: Local school district
- Grades: K-12
- Established: 1886
- Superintendent: Dan Butler
- Budget: $51,737,000 (2020-21)
- NCES District ID: 1931350

Students and staff
- Students: 3742 (2022-23)
- Teachers: 265.57 FTE
- Staff: 254.81 FTE
- Student–teacher ratio: 14.09
- Athletic conference: Mississippi Valley

Other information
- Website: www.wdbqschools.org

The Western Dubuque Community School District, (WDCSD; also known as Western Dubuque or WD) is a rural public school district based in Farley, Iowa (USA).

The district, which operates schools in western Dubuque County, is about 550 square miles (1,400 km^{2}) in area, making it the largest school district (by area) in Iowa.

== History ==
The district was established in 1960.

== General information ==
Map showing the areas served by the Western Dubuque Community School District (red).

The Western Dubuque Community School District serves an area covering 550 square miles (1,400 km^{2}), including 19 communities in five counties. Its size is about half of that of Rhode Island.

The district's territory includes all of the western half of Dubuque County, eastern parts of Delaware County, northeastern Jones County, northwestern Jackson County and extreme southeastern Clayton County. This area includes the towns of: Balltown, Bankston, Bernard, Cascade, Centralia, Dyersville, Epworth, Farley, Luxemburg, Holy Cross, New Vienna, Peosta, almost all of Rickardsville, and Worthington. All are completely or partially in Dubuque County. It also serves the unincorporated areas of Fillmore, Petersburg, and Temple Hill.

The district currently operates:

- 6 elementary schools
- 2 middle schools
- 2 high schools

WD is governed by a five-member elected school board and is managed by an appointed Superintendent of Schools. The Superintendent of Schools is Dan Butler.

=== Enrollment ===
Enrollment history & projections for the Western Dubuque Community School District 2000-2011.

In September 2007, there were 2,776 K-12 students attending WD schools. 2,432 (87.6%) of those students lived in Dubuque County, 103 (3.7%) lived in Delaware County, 137 (4.9%) lived in Jones County, 97 (3.5%) lived in Jackson County, and 7 (.3%) lived in Clayton County. Of public school students living in Dubuque County, 18.6% attend WD schools. By 2019-20, the enrollment had grown to 3,642.

== History ==
=== Recent developments ===
Recently, there has been some debate over whether or not the town of Dyersville, Iowa should remain a part of the Western Dubuque Community School District. Some residents of the town have publicly expressed feeling "neglected" or "ignored" by the WD school board. The debate seems to stem from the fact that Dyersville lacks a full K-5 elementary school, the elementary school was K-1. A new elementary school was built in Dyersville, opening in the fall of 2011. It is located near US Highway 20.

== Schools ==
Elementary schools:

- The Cascade Elementary building had a capacity of 420 students. In 2017 it had 282 students. In 1963 the school was constructed, in 1993 and 2002 received additional space. It serves residents of Cascade, Bernard, Fillmore, and Temple Hill.
- Drexler Elementary School serves Farley, Luxemburg, New Vienna, and a section of Bankston. Drexler Elementary opened in 1993.
- Dyersville Elementary School Serves Dyersville, Petersburg, and Worthington. Dyersville Elementary opened in 2011. As of 2020 it has about 292 students.
- Epworth Elementary School serves Epworth, Balltown, Holy Cross, most of Rickardsville, and a section of Bankston
- Peosta Elementary School serves Peosta and Centralia

Secondary schools:

- Drexler Middle School
- Western Dubuque High School
- Cascade Junior-Senior High School

Former schools:

- Bernard Elementary School
  - Located next to the Bernard Commercial Club Park, on a 10-acre (4.0 ha) plot of land, Bernard Elementary opened in 1960 had its current building open in 1963, and received an addition in 1967. Family sizes in the area decreased, and as years passed the enrollment grew smaller and smaller. By 2017 the school was sharing employees with Cascade Elementary, and was required to send students in kindergarten and the second grade to Cascade Elementary as the numbers of students from those grades were too small; Bernard Elementary had a total of 31 students. The district stated that the yearly cost of operating the school per student was $14,000. In February 2017 four members of the school board voted to close the school while Mark Knuth, the president of the school board, chose to abstain from voting. Students were reassigned to Cascade Elementary.

== See also ==
- Dubuque County, Iowa
- List of school districts in Iowa
