= Colin Rea =

American baseball player (born 1990)

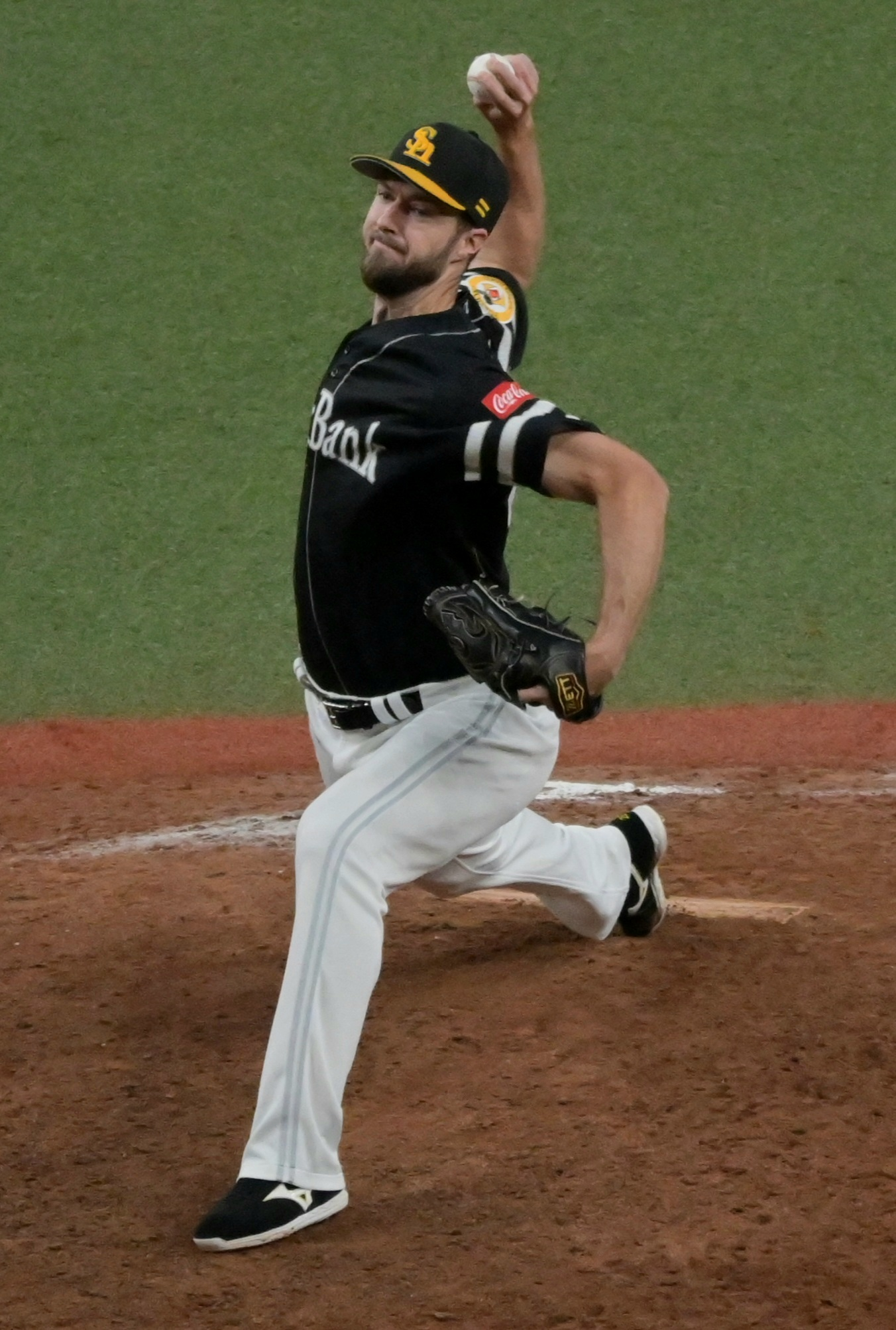
- Rea with the Fukuoka SoftBank Hawks in 2022

Free agent
- Pitcher
- Born: July 1, 1990 (age 36); Cascade, Iowa, U.S.
- Bats: Right Throws: Right

Professional debut
- MLB: August 11, 2015, for the San Diego Padres
- NPB: June 3, 2021, for the Fukuoka SoftBank Hawks

MLB statistics (through 2026 season)
- Win–loss record: 45–35
- Earned run average: 4.40
- Strikeouts: 594

NPB statistics (through 2022 season)
- Win–loss record: 8–7
- Earned run average: 3.41
- Strikeouts: 118
- Stats at Baseball Reference

Teams
- San Diego Padres (2015–2016); Miami Marlins (2016); Chicago Cubs (2020); Fukuoka SoftBank Hawks (2021); Milwaukee Brewers (2021); Fukuoka SoftBank Hawks (2022); Milwaukee Brewers (2023–2024); Chicago Cubs (2025–2026)

Colin David Rea (born July 1, 1990) is an American professional baseball pitcher who is a free agent. He has played in Major League Baseball (MLB) for the San Diego Padres, Miami Marlins, Chicago Cubs, Milwaukee Brewers, and in Nippon Professional Baseball (NPB) for the Fukuoka SoftBank Hawks.

== Career ==
=== Amateur ===
After graduating from Cascade High School in Cascade, Iowa, Rea played college baseball at the University of Northern Iowa before transferring to St. Petersburg College and then Indiana State University. In 2010, he played collegiate summer baseball with the Hyannis Harbor Hawks of the Cape Cod Baseball League.

=== San Diego Padres ===
The San Diego Padres selected Rea in the 12th round of the 2011 Major League Baseball draft. He signed with the Padres and made his professional debut in 2011 with the Low-A Eugene Emeralds, posting a 3-4 record and 2.21 ERA in 15 games. In 2012, Rea played for the Single-A Fort Wayne TinCaps, pitching to a 5-10 record and 4.11 ERA with 80 strikeouts in 103.0 innings of work. In 2013, Rea split the year between Fort Wayne and the Advanced Single-A Lake Elsinore Storm, logging a cumulative 2-6 record and 4.08 ERA. He returned to Lake Elsinore for the 2014 season, recording an 11-9 record and 3.88 ERA with 118 strikeouts in 139.0 innings pitched.

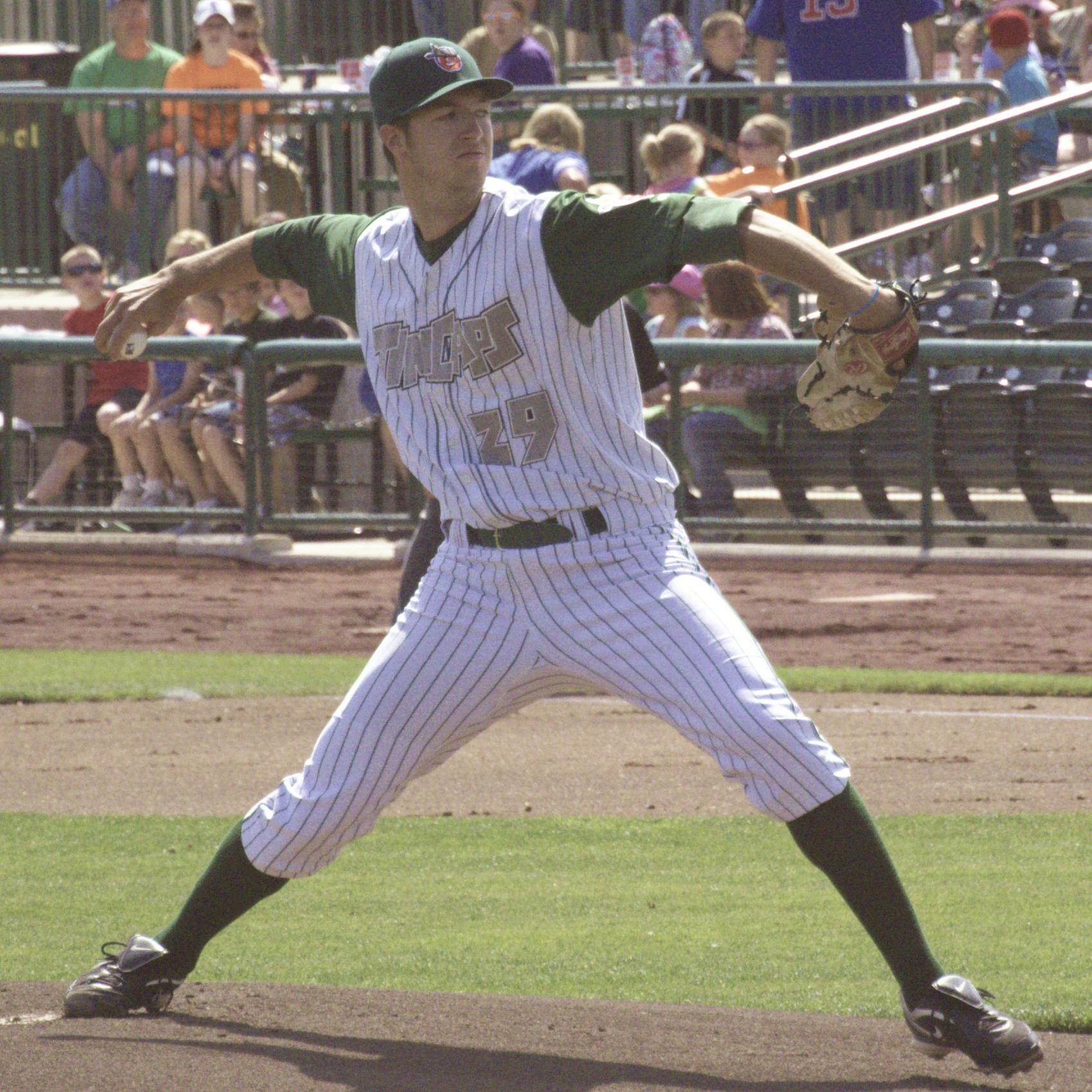
Rea pitching for the Fort Wayne TinCaps in 2012

In 2015, Rea began the season with the Double-A San Antonio Missions, and logged a 1.08 ERA in 12 games with the team. On August 11, 2015, Rea was selected to the 40-man roster and promoted to the major leagues for the first time. Rea made his major league debut that day, giving up three runs across five innings against the Cincinnati Reds. Rea made one appearance with the Triple-A El Paso Chihuahuas in 2016, allowing one run in an inning of work.

=== Miami Marlins ===
Rea was involved in a pair of transactions between the Padres and Marlins just before the MLB trade deadline on August 1, 2016. He was first traded along with Andrew Cashner and Tayron Guerrero to the Miami Marlins in exchange for Jarred Cosart, Carter Capps, Josh Naylor, and Luis Castillo on July 29. He then made his Marlins debut in an 11–0 win over the St. Louis Cardinals at Marlins Park the following night on July 30, but an injury ended his start after one out in the fourth inning. His right elbow strain landed him on the 15-day disabled list on July 31.

=== San Diego Padres (second stint) ===
Rea's four-day odyssey ended on August 1 when he and Castillo were returned to their original teams. NBC Miami reported that the Marlins felt they had been sent an injured player in Rea from the Padres. On August 5, 2016, Rea was diagnosed with a torn ulnar collateral ligament of the elbow. After visiting Dr. James Andrews, Rea opted for a platelet rich plasma injection, but it was unsuccessful. In November, Rea underwent Tommy John surgery, and was declared to miss all of the 2017 season. In 2018, Rea returned to the organization and logged a 3-5 record and 5.73 ERA in 18 games between El Paso and San Antonio. On November 20, 2018, Rea was designated for assignment by the Padres, and released six days later.

=== Chicago Cubs ===
On January 7, 2019, Rea signed a minor league contract with the Chicago Cubs organization. Rea was named 2019 Pacific Coast League Pitcher of the Year after a successful season with the Triple-A Iowa Cubs, with whom he posted a 14-4 record and 3.95 ERA in 26 appearances. The Cubs selected his contract to the 40-man roster on November 4, 2019.

The Cubs recalled Rea to the Major Leagues on July 30, 2020. In nine appearances for Chicago in 2020, Rea recorded a 5.79 ERA with 10 strikeouts across 14 innings. Rea was expected to be a part of the Cubs bullpen in 2021, but was released by the organization on January 4, 2021, so he could pursue an opportunity in Japan.

=== Fukuoka SoftBank Hawks ===
On January 7, 2021, Rea signed with the Fukuoka SoftBank Hawks of the Nippon Professional Baseball (NPB). On June 3, he made his debut at NPB as a starter in the Interleague play against the Yokohama DeNA BayStars. His wife gave birth in late July, making it difficult for him to leave his family and return to Japan. The Hawks acknowledged his desire to prioritize his family and he decided to leave the team on August 8.

=== Milwaukee Brewers ===
On August 14, 2021, Rea signed a minor league contract with the Milwaukee Brewers. He was assigned to the Triple-A Nashville Sounds. On September 29, Rea was selected to the 40-man roster. Rea made one appearance for the Brewers, pitching six innings, giving up five runs and striking out five. He became a free agent following the season.

=== Fukuoka SoftBank Hawks (second stint) ===
On December 19, 2021, Rea signed a contract to return to the Fukuoka SoftBank Hawks in Nippon Professional Baseball.

In 2022, Rea finished the regular season with 23 appearances, a 5–6 Win–loss record, 3.96 ERA, one hold, and 80 strikeouts in 100 innings of work. He became a free agent following the 2022 season.

=== Milwaukee Brewers (second stint) ===
On January 27, 2023, Rea signed a minor league contract with the Milwaukee Brewers organization. He was assigned to the Triple-A Nashville Sounds to begin the year. On April 13, his contract was selected to the active roster for a spot start against the San Diego Padres where he pitched 5 2/3 innings only giving up one run and striking out six. By the end of the season Rea, made 26 appearances for Milwaukee, 22 of which were starts, and posted a 4.55 ERA.

On November 2, 2023, Rea re-signed with Milwaukee on a one-year contract with the Brewers with a club option for 2025. In 32 games (27 starts) for the Brewers, he posted a 12-6 record and 4.29 ERA with 135 strikeouts across 167 2/3 innings pitched. On November 4, 2024, the Brewers declined Rea's option, making him a free agent.

=== Chicago Cubs (second stint) ===
On January 13, 2025, Rea signed a one-year, $5 million contract with the Chicago Cubs. He went 11-7 with a 3.95 ERA with 127 strikeouts over the course of 32 appearances, 27 of which were starts.

During the 2025 season, for each game Rea started for the Cubs and recorded at least 2 strikeouts, The Corner Taproom, a bar in Rea's hometown Cascade, Iowa, gave out a free drink to each patron. During his August 20, 2025 start against the Milwaukee Brewers, Cubs announcers Jon Sciambi and Jim Deshaies bought the patrons in the bar mozzarella sticks, after Rea induced an inning-ending double play by William Contreras.

On November 6, 2025, Rea signed a one-year, $6.5 million contract extension with the Cubs. On November 2, the Cubs declined their option on Rea making him a free agent.
