= Mike Elgin =

American football player (born 1983)

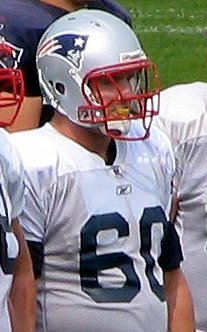
- Elgin in training camp with the Patriots in 2007

No. 60
- Position: Guard / Center

Personal information
- Born: October 15, 1983 (age 43); Iowa, U.S.
- Listed height: 6 ft 3 in (1.91 m)
- Listed weight: 282 lb (128 kg)

Career information
- High school: Western Dubuque (Epworth, Iowa)
- College: Iowa
- NFL draft: 2007: 7th round, 247th overall pick

Career history
- New England Patriots (2007)*; New York Jets (2007)*; Indianapolis Colts (2007–2008)*
- * Offseason or practice squad member only

Mike Elgin (born October 15, 1983) is an American former professional football player who was an offensive lineman in the National Football League (NFL). He was selected by the New England Patriots in the seventh round of the 2007 NFL draft. He played college football for the Iowa Hawkeyes.

Elgin was also a member of the New York Jets and Indianapolis Colts.

== Early life ==
He attended Western Dubuque High School in Epworth, Iowa.

== Professional career ==
Elgin was released on September 1. He was then signed to the Jets' practice squad after clearing waivers. Elgin was released from the Jets on October 4, 2007. He was signed to the Colts' practice squad on November 15.
