= Peosta, Iowa =

- City
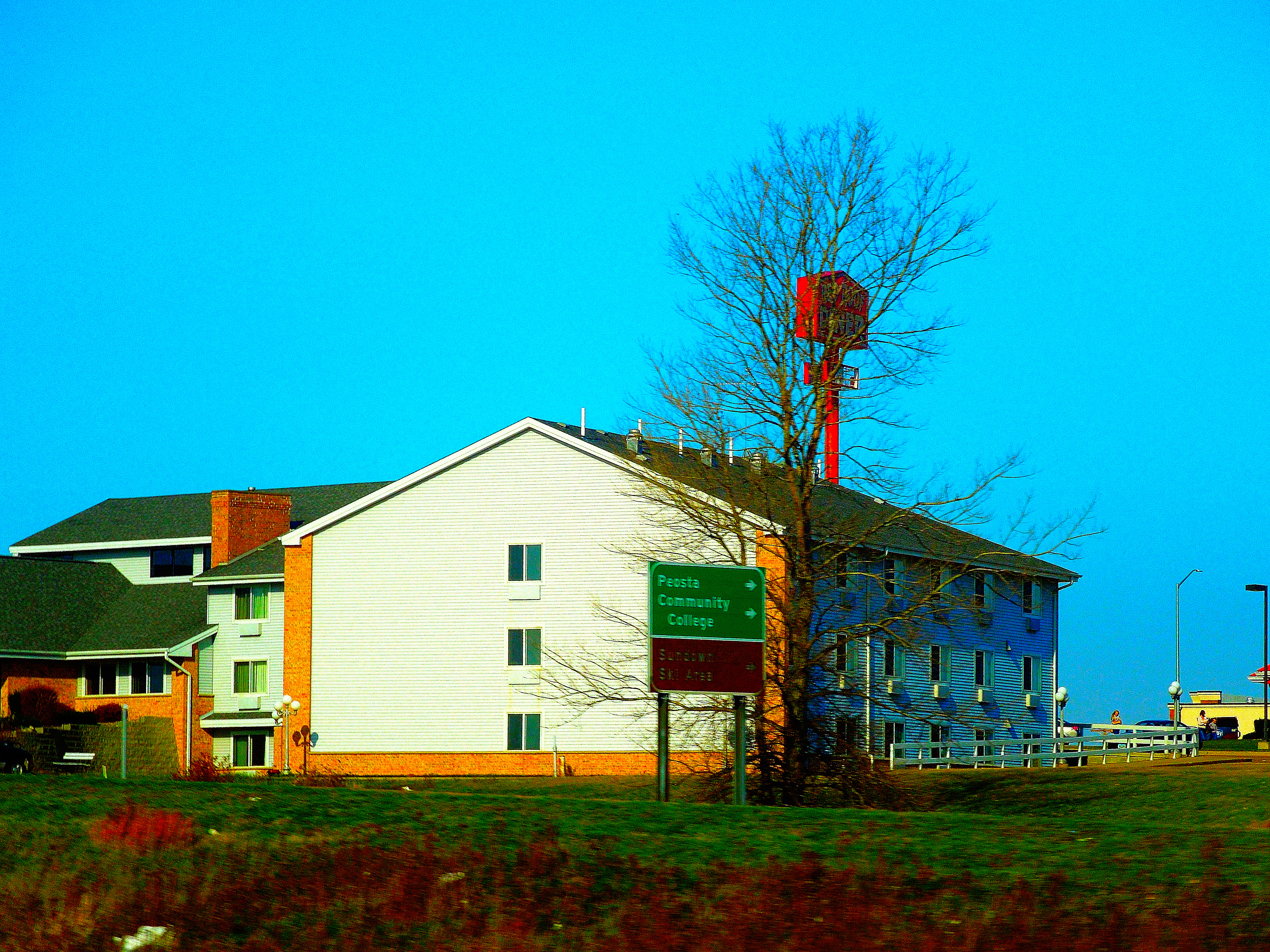
- A Quality Inn found in Peosta
- Motto: "Crossroads to the Future"
- Location in the State of Iowa
- Coordinates: 42°26′52″N 90°50′40″W
- Country: United States
- State: Iowa
- County: Dubuque
- Incorporated: June 16, 1933

Area
  - City: 2.49 sq mi (6.44 km^{2})
  - Land: 2.49 sq mi (6.44 km^{2})
  - Water: 0 sq mi (0.00 km^{2})
- Elevation: 1,070 ft (330 m)

Population (2020)
  - City: 1,908
  - Density: 768/sq mi (296.4/km^{2})
  - Metro: 92,359
- Time zone: UTC-6 (CST)
  - Summer (DST): UTC-5 (CDT)
- ZIP code: 52068
- Area code: 563
- FIPS code: 19-62130
- GNIS feature ID: 2396179
- Website: www.cityofpeosta.org

Peosta is a city in Dubuque County, Iowa, United States, and an exurb of the city of Dubuque. It is part of the Dubuque, Iowa Metropolitan Statistical Area. The population was 1,908 in the 2020 census, an increase of 193% from 651 in 2000. Peosta experienced a 70% increase in population (estimated) from 2000 to 2007, making it the state's 10th fastest-growing city during that period. Peosta is currently the sixth-largest city in Dubuque County. The community is home to the 2015 ASA D Northern Nationals Men's Slow Pitch Champions, Kass & Company, a large industrial park, the largest campus of Northeast Iowa Community College, and a handful of new commercial businesses. The city is increasingly becoming a bedroom community, much like nearby Asbury, made up of suburban subdivisions.

== History ==
Peosta is named after the leader of a local Native American people that once lived in Dubuque County. Chief Peosta, of the Meskwaki people, was a close friend of Julien Dubuque, one of the first European settlers in the area. Dubuque was also the founder of the City of Dubuque, Iowa, and was allegedly married to Chief Peosta's daughter, who was reportedly named "Potosa".

For most of its history, and even as recently as 1990, Peosta was a quiet rural town of approximately 100 people. A post office opened in Peosta in 1858. The groundwork for later growth was laid in the 1960s, when the new four-lane U.S. Route 20 opened along the city's southern edge, providing quick access to Dubuque. The city was also aided by the opening of Northeast Iowa Technical Institute (later NICC) in 1979. However, it was only when the city's industrial park began to flourish in the 1990s that the population began to soar. Peosta grew from 128 people in 1990 to over 1,300 today, and it continues to climb rapidly. This 1000% growth in 20 years has helped attract new businesses and services to Peosta as well. The city now boasts two elementary schools, its own community center, hotel, church, industrial park and expanding neighborhoods.

== Law and government ==
Peosta has a mayor–council form of government, employing a full-time city clerk, and part-time city council (mayor and five at-large city council members). The city administrator is Annette Ekhoff, the city clerk is Marcie Winkelman, and the current mayor is Russell Pfab, and the council members are: Jeff Buxton, John Kraft, Justin Lau, Alexis Goerdt and Brian Schatz.

Peosta has three city departments: Public Safety (police and fire), Public Works, and Parks & Recreation. The Parks & Recreation Dept. operates the Peosta Community Centre and Peosta's city park.

In the Iowa General Assembly, Peosta is represented by Senator Carrie Koelker (R) in the Iowa Senate, and Representative Shannon Lundgren (R) in the Iowa House of Representatives. At the federal level, Peosta is located within Iowa's 2nd congressional district, represented by Ashley Hinson (R) in the U.S. House of Representatives. Peosta, and all of Iowa, are represented by U.S. Senators Chuck Grassley (R) and Joni Ernst (R).

== Geography ==
According to the United States Census Bureau, the city has a total area of 1.97 square miles (5.10 km^{2}), all land.

== Economy ==
Peosta is home to a large and growing industrial park. The city's manufacturing, warehousing, and shipping companies form the main part of the economy. Most of the companies in the city are relatively new, which has led to a significant number of commuters driving to Peosta's employers from Dubuque, Asbury, or Dyersville. Some of the larger employers in the city include: Berry Plastics, First Gear, Mi-T-M, Bodine Electric, and Colony Brands. Also, Northeast Iowa Community College employs hundreds of people at its Peosta Campus.

== Demographics ==
Population history of Peosta, Iowa (1940-2006).

Historical population
Census	Pop.	Note	%±
1940	45		—
1950	60		33.3%
1960	50		−16.7%
1970	57		14.0%
1980	120		110.5%
1990	128		6.7%
2000	651		408.6%
2010	1,377		111.5%
2020	1,908		38.6%
U.S. Decennial Census

=== 2020 census ===
As of the 2020 census, there were 1,908 people, 630 households, and 505 families residing in the city. The population density was 767.6 inhabitants per square mile (296.4/km^{2}). There were 656 housing units at an average density of 263.9 per square mile (101.9/km^{2}).

The median age was 32.6 years. Age distribution was 37.5% under the age of 20; 4.1% from 20 to 24; 28.1% from 25 to 44; 21.3% from 45 to 64; and 9.0% who were 65 years of age or older. 33.6% of residents were under the age of 18. For every 100 females there were 103.8 males, and for every 100 females age 18 and over there were 99.7 males age 18 and over.

0.0% of residents lived in urban areas, while 100.0% lived in rural areas.

Of the 630 households, 52.1% had children under the age of 18 living in them. Of all households, 68.6% were married-couple households, 5.7% were cohabiting-couple households, 11.1% were households with a male householder and no spouse or partner present, and 14.6% were households with a female householder and no spouse or partner present. Non-families made up 19.8% of all households. About 14.8% of all households were made up of individuals, and 5.1% had someone living alone who was 65 years of age or older.

Of the 656 housing units, 4.0% were vacant. The homeowner vacancy rate was 2.0% and the rental vacancy rate was 6.3%.

Racial composition as of the 2020 census
Race	Number	Percent
White	1,781	93.3%
Black or African American	51	2.7%
American Indian and Alaska Native	1	0.1%
Asian	13	0.7%
Native Hawaiian and Other Pacific Islander	0	0.0%
Some other race	6	0.3%
Two or more races	56	2.9%
Hispanic or Latino (of any race)	29	1.5%

=== 2010 census ===
As of the census of 2010, there were 1,377 people, 438 households, and 369 families residing in the city. The population density was 699.0 inhabitants per square mile (269.9/km^{2}). There were 456 housing units at an average density of 231.5 per square mile (89.4/km^{2}). The racial makeup of the city was 96.9% White, 2.0% African American, 0.1% Native American, 0.1% Asian, and 0.7% from two or more races. Hispanic or Latino of any race were 0.9% of the population.

There were 438 households, of which 61.0% had children under the age of 18 living with them, 71.9% were married couples living together, 9.6% had a female householder with no husband present, 2.7% had a male householder with no wife present, and 15.8% were non-families. 11.6% of all households were made up of individuals, and 3.2% had someone living alone who was 65 years of age or older. The average household size was 3.14 and the average family size was 3.46.

The median age in the city was 30.2 years. 38.9% of residents were under the age of 18; 4.9% were between the ages of 18 and 24; 35.8% were from 25 to 44; 16.1% were from 45 to 64; and 4.3% were 65 years of age or older. The gender makeup of the city was 48.7% male and 51.3% female.

=== 2000 census ===
As of the census of 2000, there were 651 people, 223 households, and 183 families residing in the city. The population density was 482.9 inhabitants per square mile (186.4/km^{2}). There were 223 housing units at an average density of 165.4 per square mile (63.9/km^{2}). The racial makeup of the city was 98.92% White, 0.15% African American, 0.31% Asian, and 0.61% from two or more races. Hispanic or Latino of any race were 0.77% of the population.

There were 223 households, out of which 49.8% had children under the age of 18 living with them, 75.3% were married couples living together, 5.4% had a female householder with no husband present, and 17.5% were non-families. 14.8% of all households were made up of individuals, and 4.0% had someone living alone who was 65 years of age or older. The average household size was 2.92 and the average family size was 3.24.

Age/gender spread: 34.9% under the age of 18, 6.1% from 18 to 24, 38.2% from 25 to 44, 14.7% from 45 to 64, and 6.0% who were 65 years of age or older. The median age was 30 years. For every 100 females, there were 95.5 males. For every 100 females age 18 and over, there were 100.9 males.

The median income for a household in the city was $56,250, and the median income for a family was $56,797. Males had a median income of $38,500 versus $23,516 for females. The per capita income for the city was $17,499. About 1.2% of families and 1.7% of the population were below the poverty line, including 1.7% of those under age 18 and none of those age 65 or over.

== Education ==
All public school students living in Peosta are zoned to schools in the Western Dubuque Community School District. Elementary school students are zoned to Peosta Elementary School (in Peosta) for grades K-4. Middle school students are zoned to Drexler Middle School in Farley, and high school students are zoned to Western Dubuque High School, in nearby Epworth.

Like many other rural communities in Iowa, Peosta also has a private school. Peosta is one of two buildings that comprise Seton Catholic Elementary School, and is affiliated with the Roman Catholic Archdiocese of Dubuque. For grades PreK-5, students attend the building in Peosta, and for grades 6–8, students attend the building in Farley. For high school, parochial students attend Beckman High School in Dyersville, Iowa or Wahlert High School in Dubuque, Iowa.

For higher education, Peosta benefits from a campus of Northeast Iowa Community College, which includes large nursing, welding, business, and computer programs, among other majors. Most of the students at the school transfer to other 4-year colleges, including many to the 3 small colleges in Dubuque: Clarke College, Loras College, and University of Dubuque.

== See also ==
- Northeast Iowa Community College
