= Cascade, Iowa =

- City
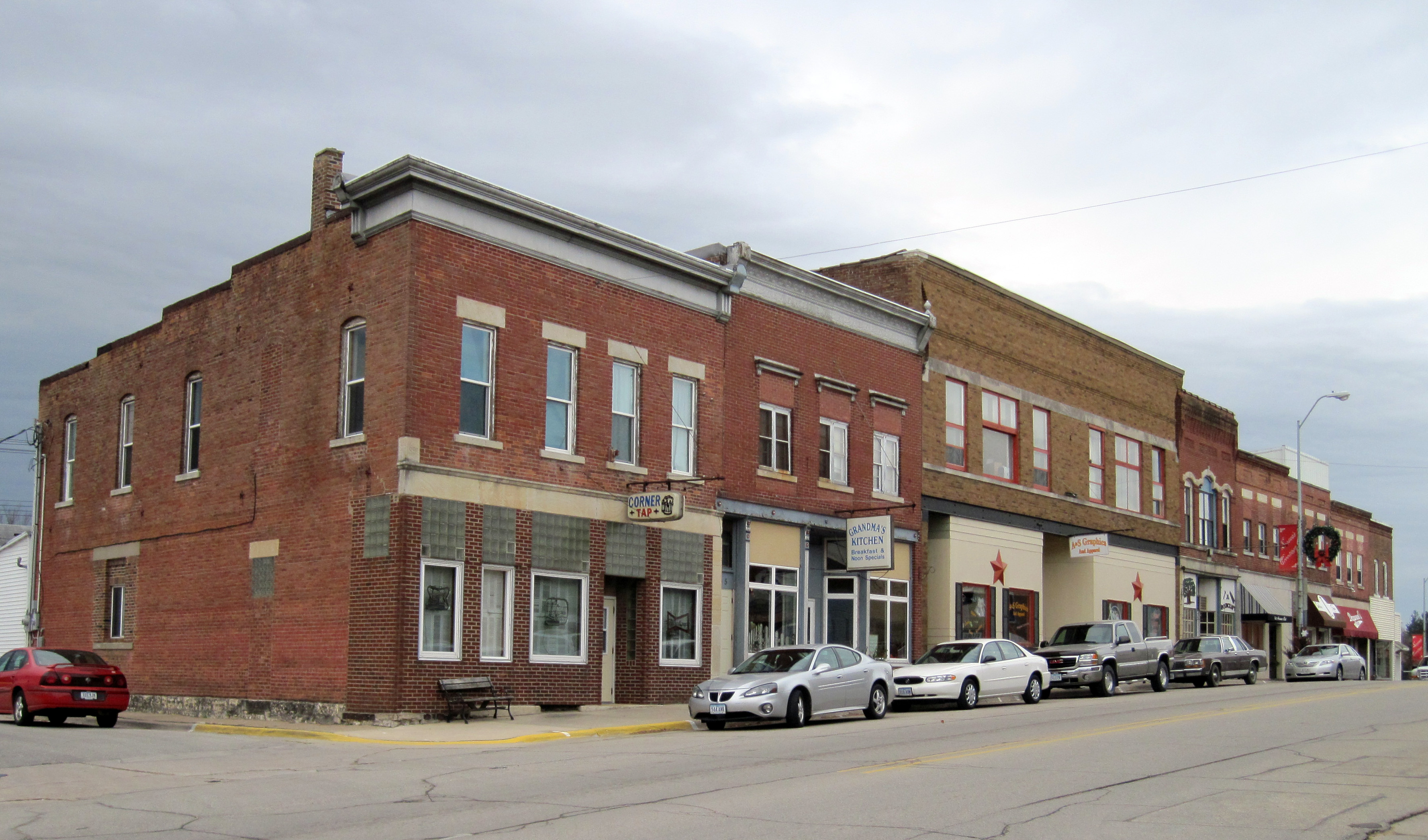
- Downtown Cascade
- Motto: "The Place We Call Home"
- Location in Iowa
- Coordinates: 42°18′11″N 90°59′50″W
- Country: United States
- State: Iowa
- Counties: Dubuque, Jones

Area
  - City: 1.92 sq mi (4.97 km^{2})
  - Land: 1.92 sq mi (4.97 km^{2})
  - Water: 0 sq mi (0.00 km^{2})
- Elevation: 860 ft (260 m)

Population (2020)
  - City: 2,386
  - Density: 1,242.3/sq mi (479.65/km^{2})
  - Metro: 92,384
- Time zone: UTC-6 (CST)
  - Summer (DST): UTC-5 (CDT)
- ZIP code: 52033
- Area code: 563
- FIPS code: 19-11305
- GNIS feature ID: 2393764
- Website: www.cityofcascade.org

Cascade is a city in Dubuque and Jones counties, Iowa, United States. The Dubuque County portion is part of Dubuque metropolitan area, while the Jones County section is part of Cedar Rapids metropolitan area. The population was 2,386 at the 2020 census, up from 1,958 in 2000. The city is located within southwestern of Dubuque County and north-central Jones County.

Arguably the town's most notable historic event was the 1925 flood. Between 1880 and 1936, the town was connected to Bellevue via the Chicago, St. Paul & Milwaukee Railroad Company. It was Iowa's last narrow gauge railroad with a gauge of 3'. The roadbed curves and grades were considered too extreme for conversion to standard gauge.

U.S. Route 151 runs through Cascade but in 2002, a four-lane bypass took traffic north around the city. Iowa Highway 136 runs from north to south through Cascade.

== Geography ==
According to the United States Census Bureau, the city has a total area of 1.87 square miles (4.84 km^{2}), all land. The North Fork Maquoketa River passes through Cascade.

Cascade is located 25 miles southwest of Dubuque.

=== Climate ===
Climate data for Cascade, Iowa (1991–2020)
Month	Jan	Feb	Mar	Apr	May	Jun	Jul	Aug	Sep	Oct	Nov	Dec	Year
Mean daily maximum °F (°C)	27.4 (−2.6)	31.8 (−0.1)	44.9 (7.2)	58.8 (14.9)	70.4 (21.3)	79.9 (26.6)	83.1 (28.4)	81.3 (27.4)	75.0 (23.9)	61.8 (16.6)	46.2 (7.9)	32.8 (0.4)	57.8 (14.3)
Daily mean °F (°C)	19.4 (−7.0)	23.3 (−4.8)	35.5 (1.9)	47.9 (8.8)	59.7 (15.4)	69.7 (20.9)	72.8 (22.7)	70.7 (21.5)	63.0 (17.2)	50.2 (10.1)	37.1 (2.8)	25.3 (−3.7)	47.9 (8.8)
Mean daily minimum °F (°C)	11.4 (−11.4)	14.7 (−9.6)	26.2 (−3.2)	37.0 (2.8)	48.9 (9.4)	59.5 (15.3)	62.6 (17.0)	60.0 (15.6)	51.1 (10.6)	38.5 (3.6)	28.0 (−2.2)	17.7 (−7.9)	38.0 (3.3)
Average precipitation inches (mm)	1.26 (32)	1.45 (37)	2.15 (55)	3.97 (101)	4.21 (107)	5.96 (151)	4.53 (115)	4.65 (118)	3.79 (96)	3.26 (83)	2.33 (59)	1.75 (44)	39.31 (998)
Average snowfall inches (cm)	8.3 (21)	8.8 (22)	4.2 (11)	0.9 (2.3)	0.0 (0.0)	0.0 (0.0)	0.0 (0.0)	0.0 (0.0)	0.0 (0.0)	0.2 (0.51)	1.8 (4.6)	6.9 (18)	31.1 (79.41)
Source: NOAA

== Demographics ==
Historical populations
Year	Pop.	±%
1880	762	—
1890	955	+25.3%
1900	1,266	+32.6%
1910	1,268	+0.2%
1920	1,249	−1.5%
1930	1,221	−2.2%
1940	1,376	+12.7%
1950	1,299	−5.6%
1960	1,601	+23.2%
1970	1,744	+8.9%
1980	1,912	+9.6%
1990	1,812	−5.2%
2000	1,958	+8.1%
2010	2,159	+10.3%
2020	2,386	+10.5%
Source:"U.S. Census website". United States Census Bureau. and Iowa Data Center; Source: U.S. Decennial Census

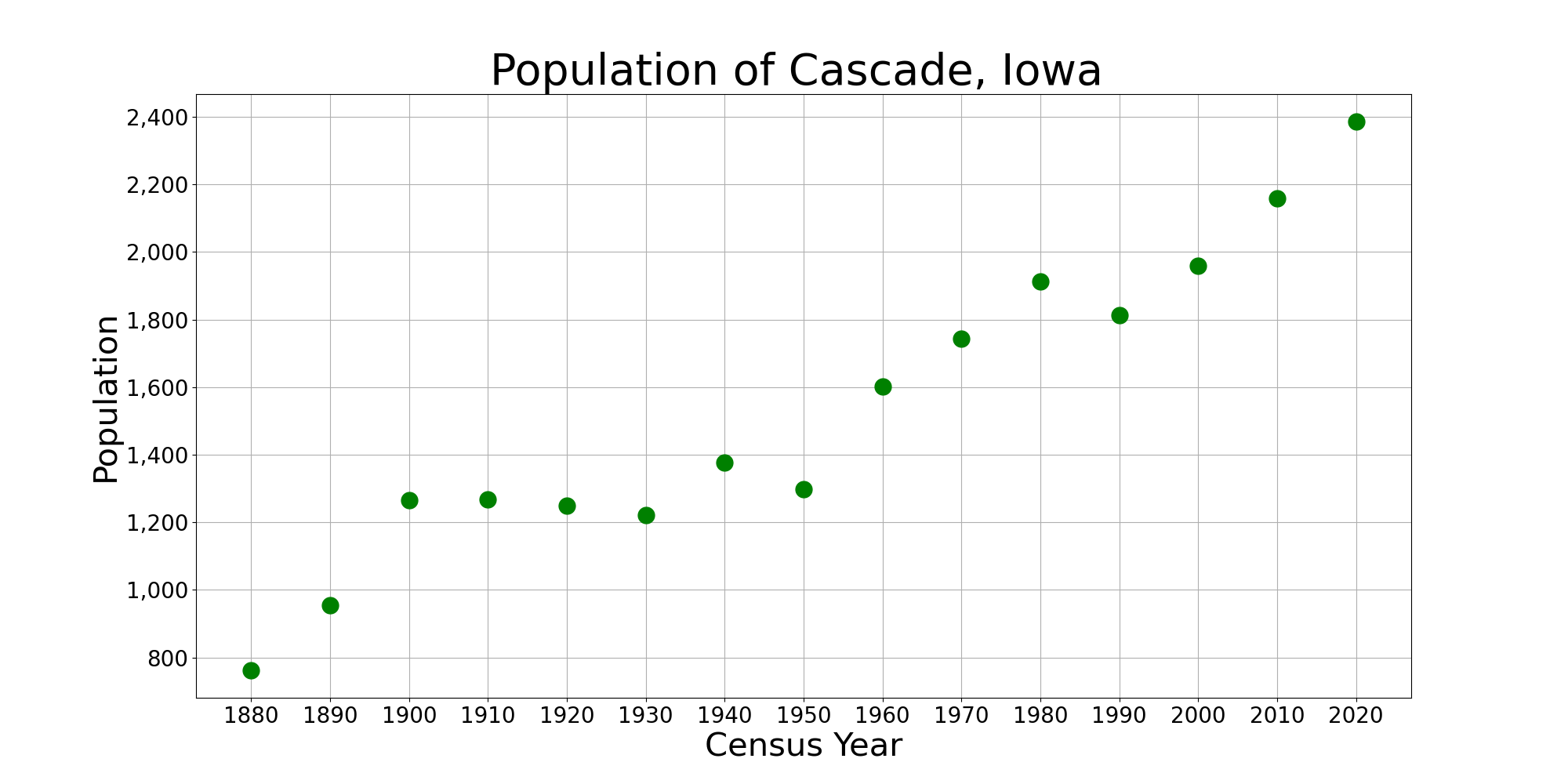
The population of Cascade, Iowa from US census data

=== 2020 census ===
As of the 2020 census, Cascade had a population of 2,386. The median age was 40.2 years. 24.3% of residents were under the age of 18 and 22.6% were 65 years of age or older. For every 100 females, there were 99.5 males, and for every 100 females age 18 and over, there were 99.2 males age 18 and over.

There were 970 households, including 630 families, in the city. Of those households, 32.3% had children under the age of 18 living in them. 54.1% were married-couple households, 19.5% were households with a male householder and no spouse or partner present, and 20.9% were households with a female householder and no spouse or partner present. About 35.1% of households were non-families, 30.4% were made up of individuals, and 14.1% had someone living alone who was 65 years of age or older.

There were 1,050 housing units. The population density was 1,242.3 inhabitants per square mile (479.6/km^{2}), and the housing unit density was 546.7 per square mile (211.1/km^{2}). Of housing units, 7.6% were vacant. The homeowner vacancy rate was 0.8% and the rental vacancy rate was 11.7%.

0.0% of residents lived in urban areas, while 100.0% lived in rural areas.

The gender makeup of the city was 49.9% male and 50.1% female. 26.3% of residents were under the age of 20, 4.5% were between the ages of 20 and 24, 24.3% were from 25 and 44, and 22.3% were from 45 and 64.

Racial composition as of the 2020 census
Race	Number	Percent
White	2,273	95.3%
Black or African American	7	0.3%
American Indian and Alaska Native	0	0.0%
Asian	7	0.3%
Native Hawaiian and Other Pacific Islander	3	0.1%
Some other race	41	1.7%
Two or more races	55	2.3%
Hispanic or Latino (of any race)	80	3.4%

=== 2010 census ===
As of the census of 2010, there were 2,159 people, 880 households, and 578 families living in the city. The population density was 1,154.5 inhabitants per square mile (445.8/km^{2}). There were 974 housing units at an average density of 520.9 per square mile (201.1/km^{2}). The racial makeup of the city was 96.2% White, 0.4% African American, 0.1% Native American, 0.2% Asian, 0.2% Pacific Islander, 2.5% from other races, and 0.4% from two or more races. Hispanic or Latino of any race were 3.6% of the population.

There were 880 households, of which 32.3% had children under the age of 18 living with them, 53.4% were married couples living together, 8.5% had a female householder with no husband present, 3.8% had a male householder with no wife present, and 34.3% were non-families. 29.4% of all households were made up of individuals, and 14.5% had someone living alone who was 65 years of age or older. The average household size was 2.39 and the average family size was 2.99.

The median age in the city was 38.7 years. 26.2% of residents were under the age of 18; 7% were between the ages of 18 and 24; 24% were from 25 to 44; 23.3% were from 45 to 64; and 19.4% were 65 years of age or older. The gender makeup of the city was 49.0% male and 51.0% female.

=== 2000 census ===
As of the census of 2000, there were 1,958 people, 776 households, and 511 families living in the city. The population density was 1,731.2 inhabitants per square mile (668.4/km^{2}). There were 820 housing units at an average density of 725.0 per square mile (279.9/km^{2}). The racial makeup of the city was 99.28% White, 0.10% Native American, 0.10% Asian, and 0.51% from two or more races. Hispanic or Latino of any race were 0.31% of the population.

There were 776 households, out of which 32.7% had children under the age of 18 living with them, 56.7% were married couples living together, 6.4% had a female householder with no husband present, and 34.1% were non-families. 29.9% of all households were made up of individuals, and 13.3% had someone living alone who was 65 years of age or older. The average household size was 2.44 and the average family size was 3.08.

26.0% are under the age of 18, 8.6% from 18 to 24, 26.6% from 25 to 44, 20.0% from 45 to 64 and 18.8% who were 65 years of age or older. The median age was 37 years. For every 100 females, there were 99.8 males. For every 100 females age 18 and over, there were 94.4 males.

The median income for a household in the city was $40,273, and the median income for a family was $47,813. Males had a median income of $31,324 versus $22,209 for females. The per capita income for the city was $18,280. About 7.8% of families and 11.1% of the population were below the poverty line, including 12.4% of those under age 18 and 13.4% of those age 65 or over.

== Government ==
In the Iowa General Assembly, Cascade is represented by Senator Carrie Koelker (R-Dyersville) in the Iowa Senate, and Representative Steve Bradley (R-Cascade) in the Iowa House of Representatives. At the federal level, it is within Iowa's 1st congressional district, represented by Ashley Hinson (R) in the U.S. House of Representatives. Cascade, and all of Iowa, are represented by U.S. Senators Chuck Grassley (R) and Joni Ernst (R).

== Education ==
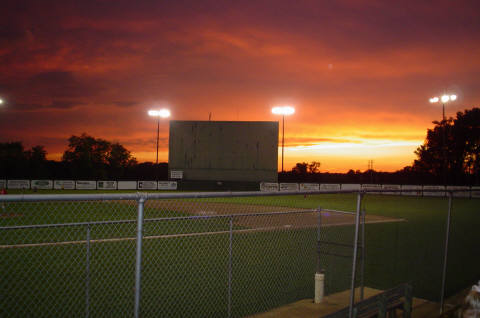
Cascade's Baseball Field at Sunset

All public school students living in Cascade are zoned to schools in the Western Dubuque Community School District. Students first attend Cascade Elementary School for grades K-5, then the consolidated Cascade Junior-Senior High School for grades 6-12 (both in Cascade).

The Cascade Elementary building, on First Ave E, has a capacity of 420 students, and houses them in 14 general classrooms and two special education classrooms. In 1961, the school was constructed. In 1993 and 2002, it received additional space. In 2017, it had 282 students.

Cascade has a private school. Parochial school students attend Aquin Elementary School (in Cascade) for grades K-8, then Beckman High School (in Dyersville) for grades 9–12. These schools are affiliated with the Roman Catholic Church, and are a part of the Roman Catholic Archdiocese of Dubuque.

== Notable people ==
- Gary Dolphin, broadcast announcer for University of Iowa basketball and football
- Red Faber, Chicago White Sox pitcher, member of the 1919 World Series team but not part of the Black Sox Scandal
- Julie Hosch, farmer and Iowa state legislator
- Loras Thomas Lane, Roman Catholic bishop
- Greg McDermott, head men's basketball coach at Creighton University
- William Menster, Roman Catholic priest
- Jeremie Miller, founder of the Jabber project and board member of Bluesky
- Colin Rea, pitcher for the Chicago Cubs
