= Epworth, Iowa =

- City
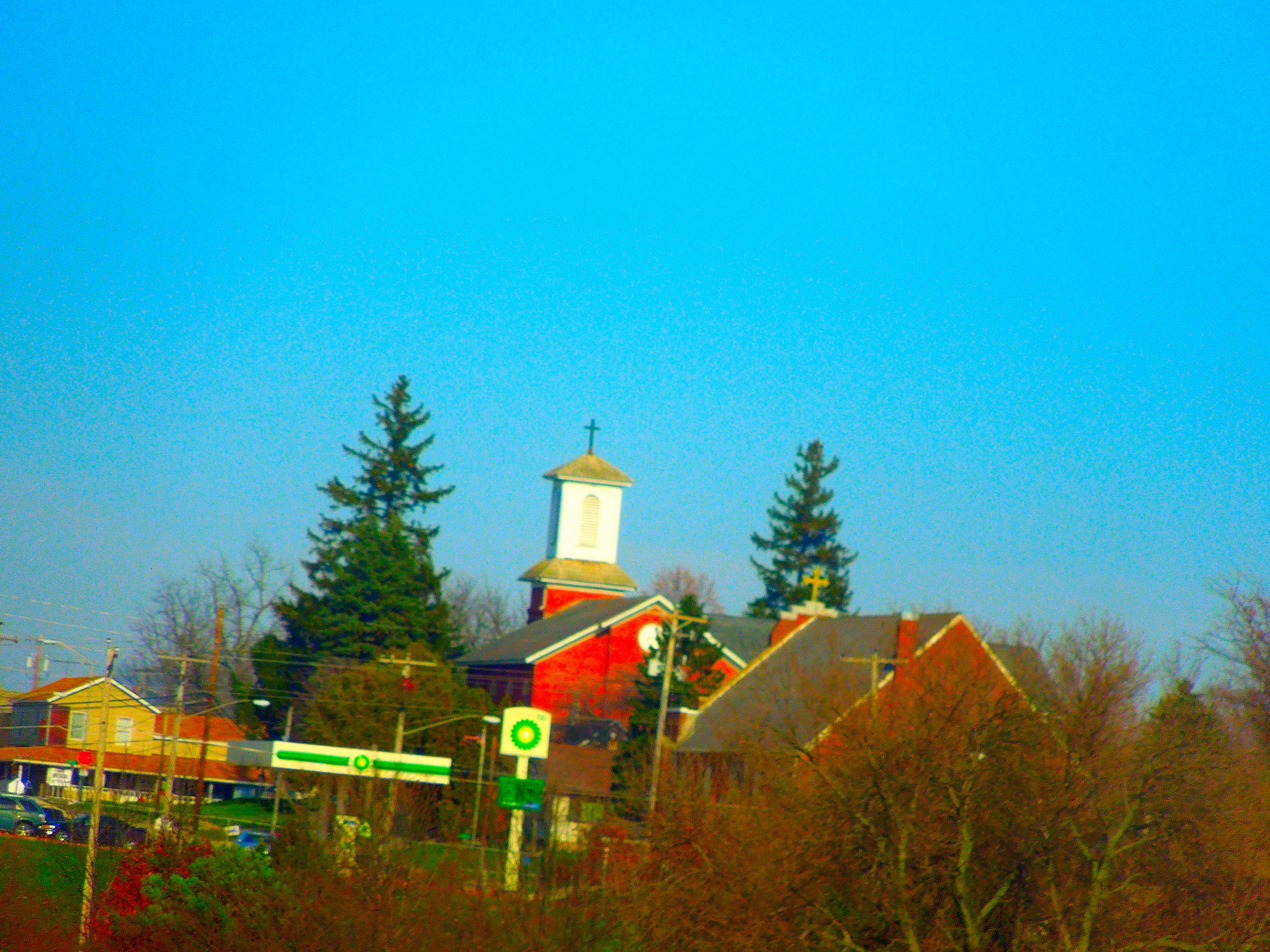
- St. Patrick Catholic Church
- Motto: "Small town, Big heart"
- Location in the State of Iowa

- Location in the United States
- Coordinates: 42°26′48″N 90°55′53″W
- Country: United States
- State: Iowa
- County: Dubuque
- Named after: Epworth, England

Area
  - City: 1.78 sq mi (4.61 km^{2})
  - Land: 1.78 sq mi (4.61 km^{2})
  - Water: 0 sq mi (0.00 km^{2})
- Elevation: 1,047 ft (319 m)

Population (2020)
  - City: 2,023
  - Density: 1,137.7/sq mi (439.28/km^{2})
  - Metro: 92,384
- Time zone: UTC-6 (CST)
  - Summer (DST): UTC-5 (CDT)
- ZIP code: 52045
- Area code: 563
- FIPS code: 19-25725
- GNIS feature ID: 2394696
- Website: Official site of the City of Epworth, Iowa

Epworth is a city in Dubuque County, Iowa, United States. It is part of the Dubuque, Iowa Metropolitan Statistical Area. The population was 2,023 at the 2020 census, up from 1,428 in 2000.

== History ==
Epworth was platted in 1855. It was named from the town of Epworth, Lincolnshire, England, the birthplace of John Wesley. Epworth was incorporated as a city on November 20, 1879,

== Geography ==
According to the United States Census Bureau, the city has a total area of 1.56 square miles (4.04 km^{2}), all land.

Epworth is located along U.S. Route 20, and is approximately 12 miles west of Dubuque.

== Demographics ==
Historical populations
Year	Pop.	±%
1890	348	—
1900	549	+57.8%
1910	520	−5.3%
1920	468	−10.0%
1930	464	−0.9%
1940	454	−2.2%
1950	536	+18.1%
1960	698	+30.2%
1970	1,132	+62.2%
1980	1,380	+21.9%
1990	1,303	−5.6%
2000	1,428	+9.6%
2010	1,860	+30.3%
2020	2,023	+8.8%
Source:"U.S. Census website". United States Census Bureau. and Iowa Data Center; Source: U.S. Decennial Census

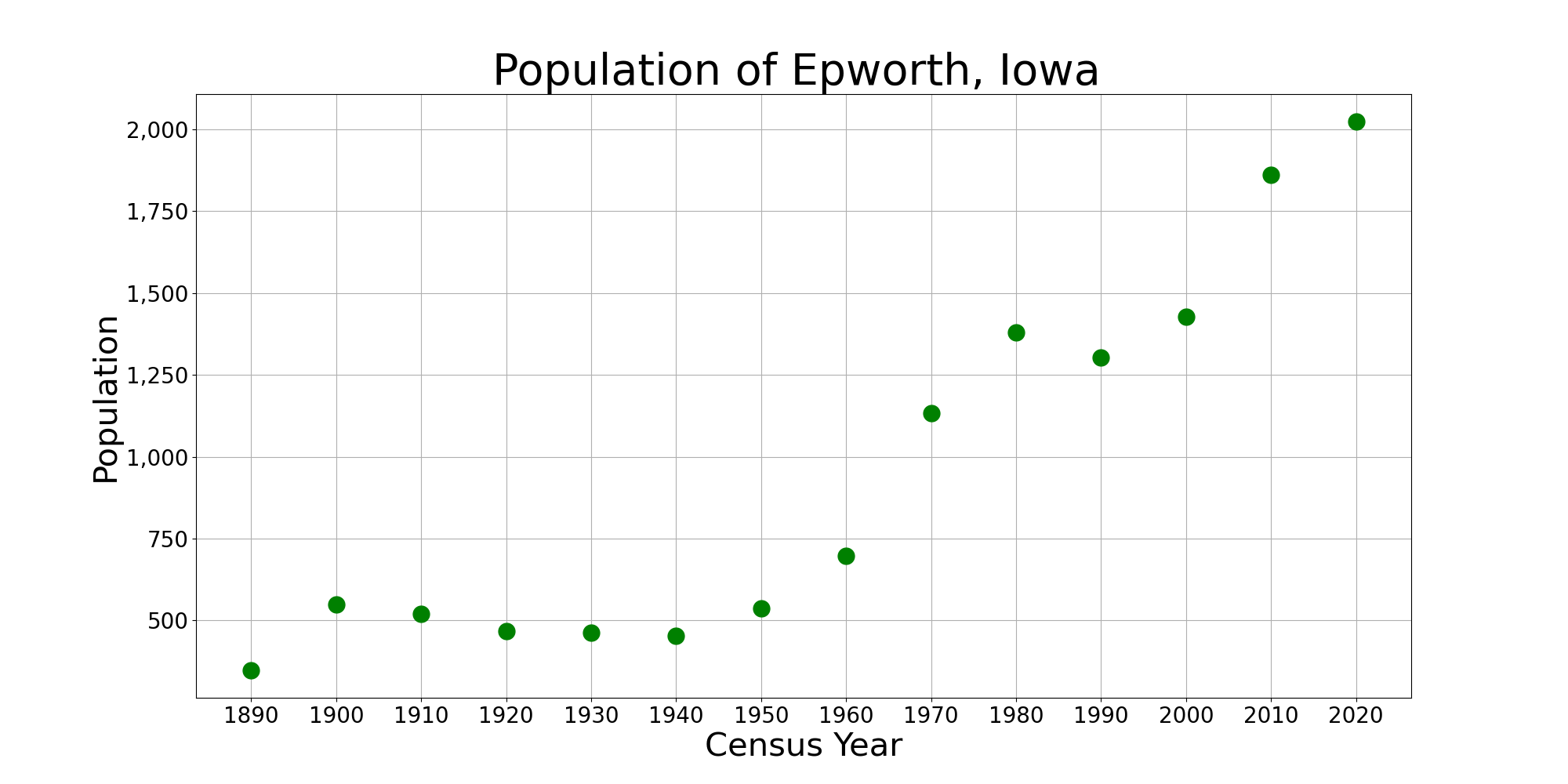
The population of Epworth, Iowa from US census data

=== 2020 census ===
As of the 2020 census, there were 2,023 people, 699 households, and 504 families residing in the city. The population density was 1,137.7 inhabitants per square mile (439.3/km^{2}). There were 717 housing units at an average density of 403.2 per square mile (155.7/km^{2}). Of the housing units, 2.5% were vacant, with a homeowner vacancy rate of 0.7% and a rental vacancy rate of 6.6%.

Of the 699 households, 36.8% had children under the age of 18 living with them, 61.8% were married-couple households, 5.0% were cohabitating-couple households, 18.3% had a female householder with no spouse or partner present, and 14.9% had a male householder with no spouse or partner present. Non-families made up 27.9% of households. About 23.3% of all households were made up of individuals, and 9.9% had someone living alone who was 65 years old or older.

The median age in the city was 35.5 years. 25.1% of residents were under the age of 18 and 14.9% were 65 years of age or older. By broader age groups, 28.0% of residents were under the age of 20; 7.0% were between the ages of 20 and 24; 26.5% were from 25 to 44; and 23.6% were from 45 to 64. For every 100 females, there were 100.1 males, and for every 100 females age 18 and over there were 100.5 males age 18 and over.

0.0% of residents lived in urban areas, while 100.0% lived in rural areas.

Racial composition as of the 2020 census
Race	Number	Percent
White	1,839	90.9%
Black or African American	44	2.2%
American Indian and Alaska Native	2	0.1%
Asian	88	4.3%
Native Hawaiian and Other Pacific Islander	0	0.0%
Some other race	22	1.1%
Two or more races	28	1.4%
Hispanic or Latino (of any race)	39	1.9%

=== 2010 census ===
As of the census of 2010, there were 1,860 people, 643 households, and 488 families residing in the city. The population density was 1,192.3 inhabitants per square mile (460.3/km^{2}). There were 651 housing units at an average density of 417.3 per square mile (161.1/km^{2}). The racial makeup of the city was 93.9% White, 0.8% African American, 4.8% Asian, 0.3% from other races, and 0.2% from two or more races. Hispanic or Latino of any race were 0.4% of the population.

There were 643 households, of which 39.2% had children under the age of 18 living with them, 62.8% were married couples living together, 8.6% had a female householder with no husband present, 4.5% had a male householder with no wife present, and 24.1% were non-families. 19.4% of all households were made up of individuals, and 6.6% had someone living alone who was 65 years of age or older. The average household size was 2.71 and the average family size was 3.13.

The median age in the city was 33.1 years. 28.7% of residents were under the age of 18; 8.8% were between the ages of 18 and 24; 29.1% were from 25 to 44; 23.6% were from 45 to 64; and 9.7% were 65 years of age or older. The gender makeup of the city was 51.5% male and 48.5% female.

=== 2000 census ===
As of the census of 2000, there were 1,428 people, 476 households, and 364 families residing in the city. The population density was 1,089.8 inhabitants per square mile (420.8/km^{2}). There were 500 housing units at an average density of 381.6 per square mile (147.3/km^{2}). The racial makeup of the city was 93.21% White, 0.49% African American, 0.07% Native American, 5.18% Asian, 0.49% from other races, and 0.56% from two or more races. Hispanic or Latino of any race were 0.63% of the population.

There were 476 households, out of which 45.0% had children under the age of 18 living with them, 65.1% were married couples living together, 8.4% had a female householder with no husband present, and 23.5% were non-families. 19.7% of all households were made up of individuals, and 7.1% had someone living alone who was 65 years of age or older. The average household size was 2.79 and the average family size was 3.24.

28.1% are under the age of 18, 10.2% from 18 to 24, 31.9% from 25 to 44, 19.9% from 45 to 64, and 9.9% are 65 years of age or older. The median age was 33 years. For every 100 females, there were 113.8 males. For every 100 females age 18 and over, there were 121.3 males.

The median income for a household in the city was $39,938, and the median income for a family was $47,321. Males had a median income of $35,144 versus $20,234 for females. The per capita income for the city was $15,869. About 3.5% of families and 6.2% of the population were below the poverty line, including 6.3% of those under age 18 and 9.3% of those age 65 or over.

== Economy ==
Epworth is the fifth-largest city in Dubuque County with spacious, new subdivisions housing many new residents, a significant portion of whom work in Dubuque, Iowa or elsewhere outside the community. The 11.3% increase in population from 2000 to 2006 places Epworth above the 90th percentile in population growth among municipalities nationwide.

== Government ==
The mayor of Epworth is Sandra Gassman. The council members are Dana Nadermann, Karen Conrad, Dan Wilgenbusch, Tony Krapfl, and Ben Wolf.

In the Iowa General Assembly, Epworth is represented by Senator Tom Hancock (D-Epworth) in the Iowa Senate, and Representative Ray Zirkelbach (D-Monticello) in the Iowa House of Representatives. At the federal level, it is within Iowa's 1st congressional district, represented by Bruce Braley (D-Waterloo) in the U.S. House of Representatives. Epworth, and all of Iowa, are, as of 2026, represented by U.S. Senators Chuck Grassley (R) and Joni Ernst (R).

== Education ==
=== Public schools ===
All public school students living in Epworth are zoned to schools in the Western Dubuque Community School District. Elementary school students are zoned to Epworth Elementary School (in Epworth) for grades K-5. Middle school students are zoned to Drexler Middle School (in nearby Farley), and high school students are zoned to Western Dubuque High School, which is also in Epworth.

=== Private schools ===
Like many other rural communities in Iowa, Epworth also has a private school. Seton Catholic Elementary School- Epworth is one of three buildings that comprise Seton Catholic Elementary School, and is affiliated with the Roman Catholic Archdiocese of Dubuque. For grades 1–2, students go to the building in Epworth, for grades 3–5, students attend the building in nearby Peosta, Iowa, and for grades 6–8, students go to the building in nearby Farley. For high school, parochial students attend Beckman High School in Dyersville, Iowa or Wahlert High School in Dubuque, Iowa.

=== Colleges and universities ===
Epworth is home to Divine Word College, which is a Roman Catholic seminary.

== Notable people ==
- Tom Hancock (1948-2016) former Iowa state senator.
- Henry Waechter (1959– ) former NFL lineman, 1985 Chicago Bears
