= Farley, Iowa =

- City
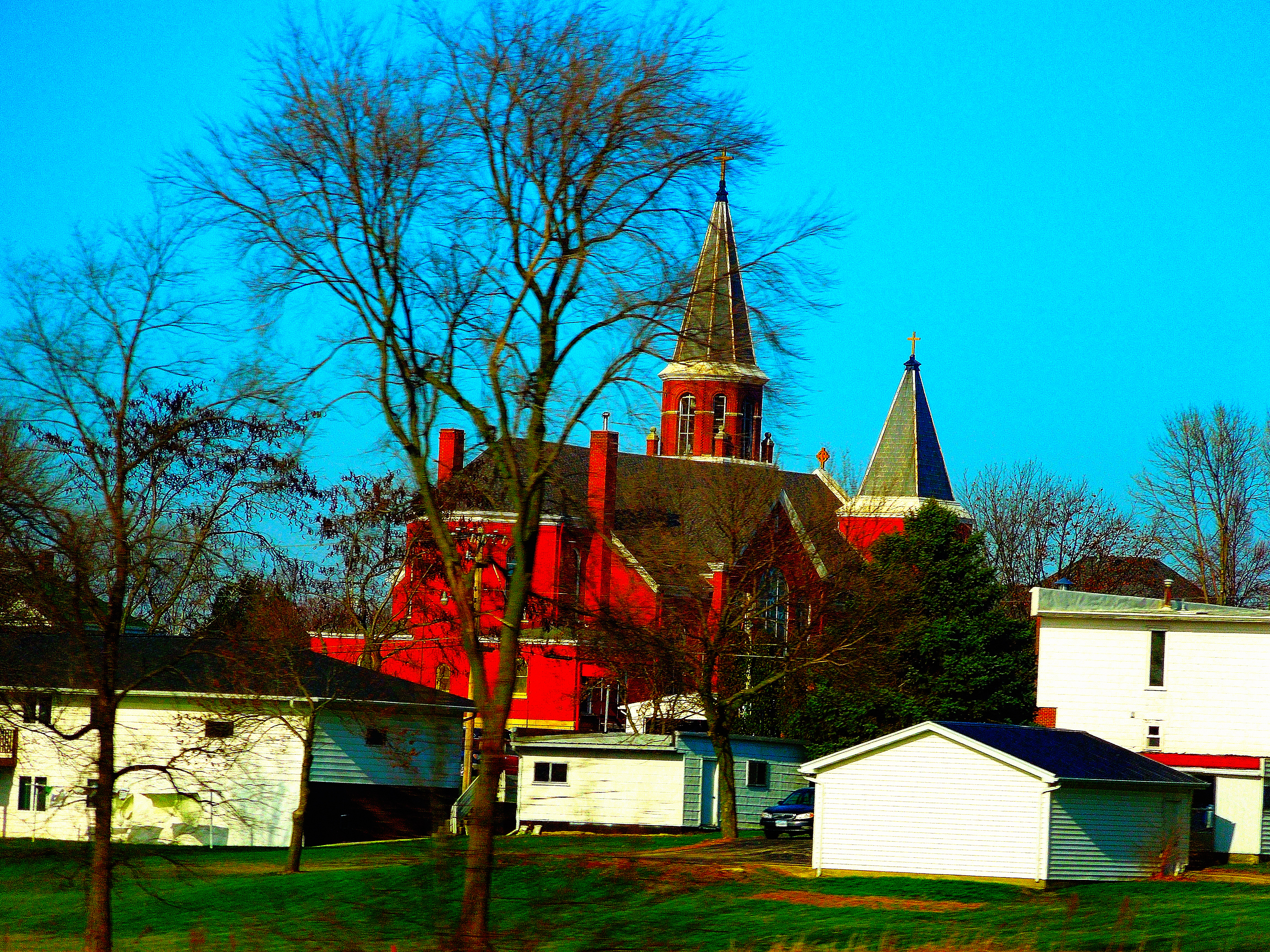
- St. Joseph's Catholic Church
- Motto: "Heart of the Cornbelt"
- Location in the State of Iowa
- Coordinates: 42°26′37″N 91°00′15″W
- Country: United States
- State: Iowa
- County: Dubuque
- Incorporated: June 23, 1879

Area
  - City: 1.62 sq mi (4.19 km^{2})
  - Land: 1.62 sq mi (4.19 km^{2})
  - Water: 0 sq mi (0.00 km^{2})
- Elevation: 1,112 ft (339 m)

Population (2020)
  - City: 1,766
  - Density: 1,091.3/sq mi (421.37/km^{2})
  - Metro: 92,384
- Time zone: UTC-6 (CST)
  - Summer (DST): UTC-5 (CDT)
- ZIP code: 52046
- Area code: 563
- FIPS code: 19-26760
- GNIS feature ID: 2394743
- Website: www.farleyiowa.com

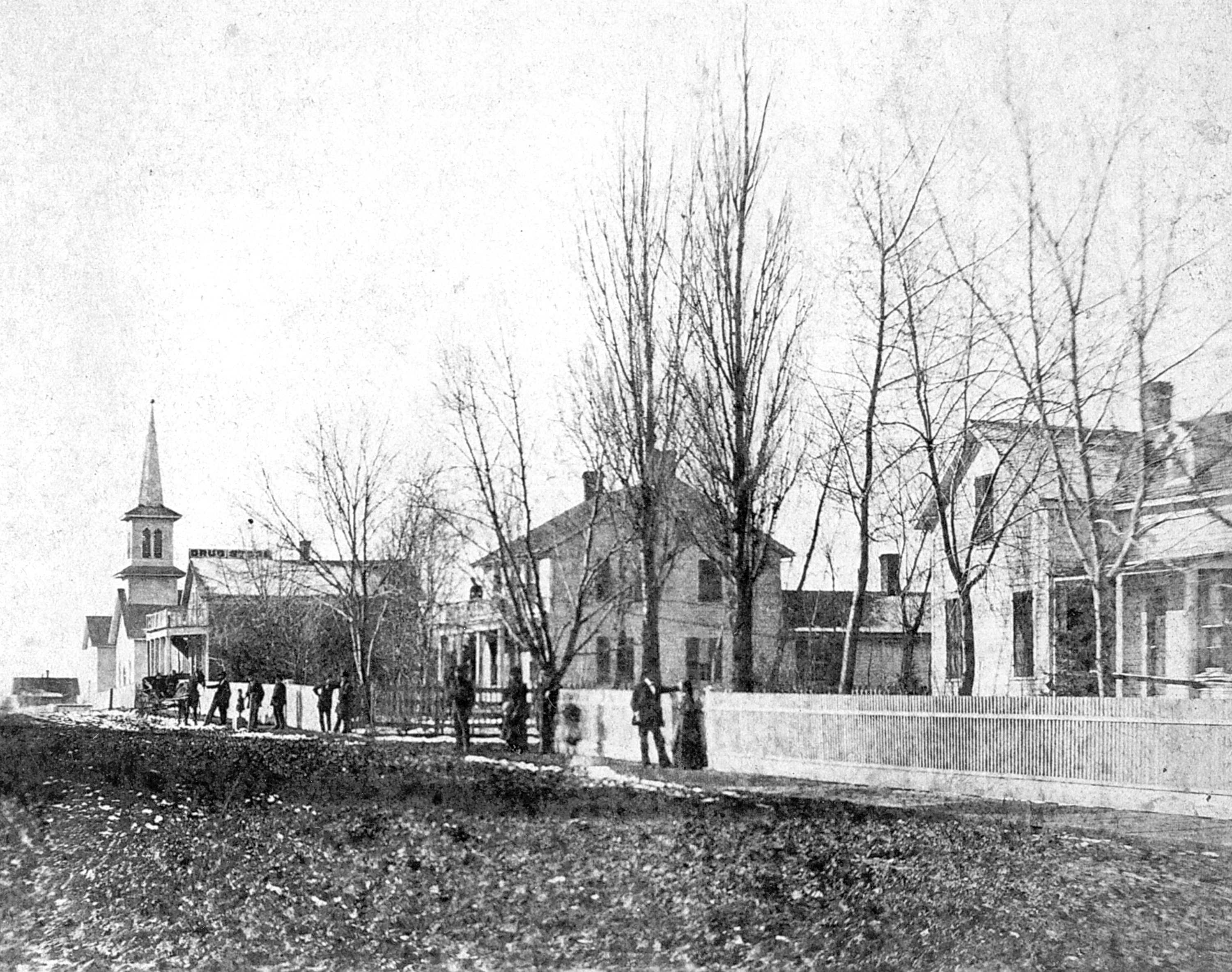
Main Street, Farley, Iowa, 1898

Farley is a city in Dubuque County, Iowa, United States. It is part of the Dubuque, Iowa Metropolitan Statistical Area. The population was 1,766 at the time of the 2020 census, up from 1,334 in 2000. Farley is the seventh-largest town in Dubuque County, recently passed by Peosta, Iowa.

Farley is home to a 3/8 mile dirt race track, 300 Raceway.

== History ==
Farley got its start in the 1850s, following construction of the Dubuque and Sioux City Railroad through that territory. Farley was named for the superintendent of the Sioux City Railroad.

== Geography ==
According to the United States Census Bureau, the city has a total area of 1.85 square miles (4.79 km^{2}), all land. It is crossed by U.S. Route 20 in the south.

== Demographics ==
Historical populations
Year	Pop.	±%
1880	471	—
1890	582	+23.6%
1900	513	−11.9%
1910	676	+31.8%
1920	651	−3.7%
1930	657	+0.9%
1940	739	+12.5%
1950	745	+0.8%
1960	920	+23.5%
1970	1,096	+19.1%
1980	1,287	+17.4%
1990	1,348	+4.7%
2000	1,334	−1.0%
2010	1,537	+15.2%
2020	1,766	+14.9%
Source:"U.S. Census website". United States Census Bureau. and Iowa Data Center; Source: U.S. Decennial Census

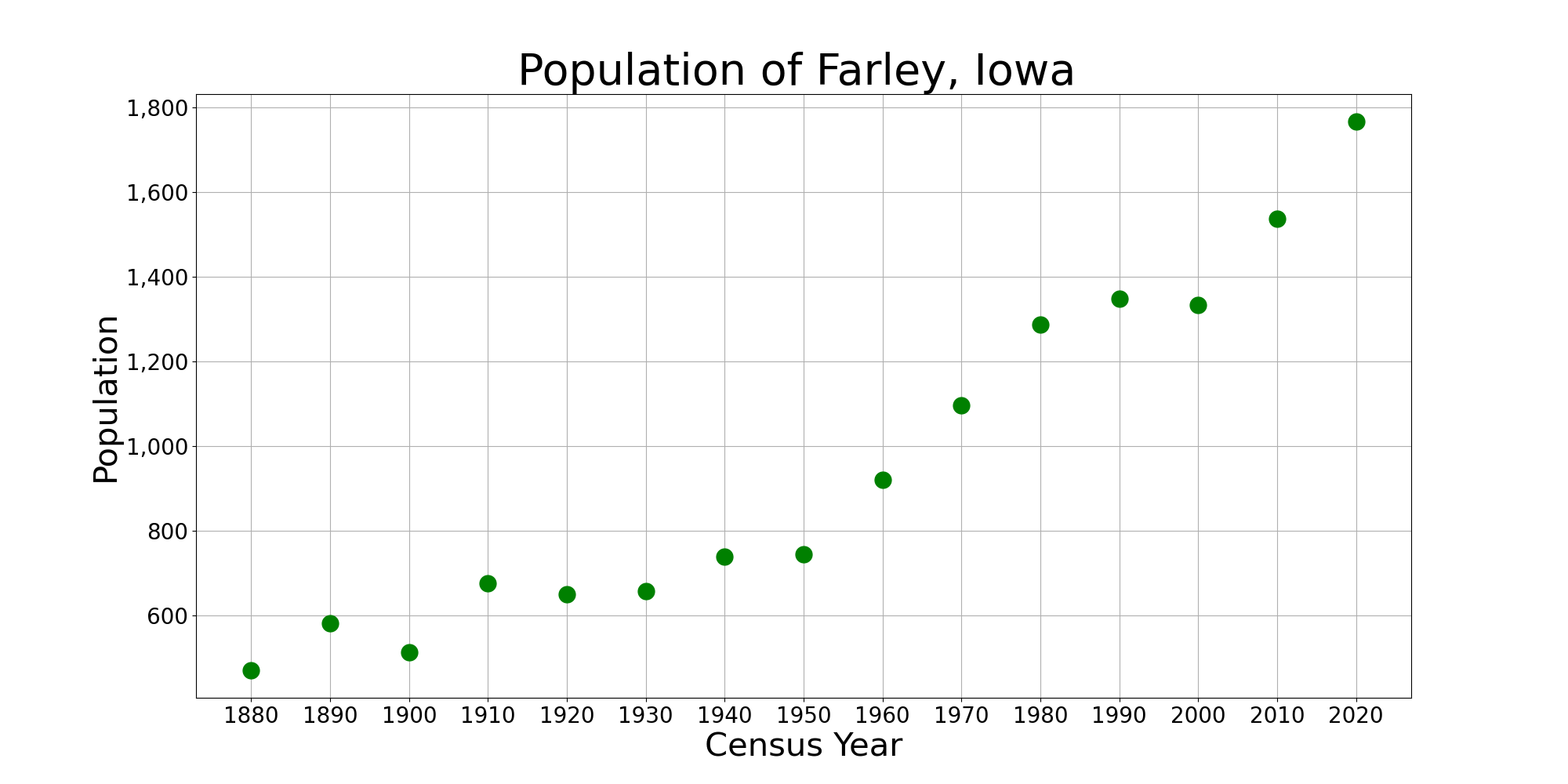
The population of Farley, Iowa from US census data

=== 2020 census ===
As of the 2020 census, there were 1,766 people, 654 households, and 467 families residing in the city. The population density was 1,091.3 inhabitants per square mile (421.4/km^{2}). There were 678 housing units at an average density of 419.0 per square mile (161.8/km^{2}).

The median age was 33.7 years. 27.7% of residents were under the age of 18 and 12.3% were 65 years of age or older. For every 100 females, there were 103.9 males, and for every 100 females age 18 and over, there were 99.8 males age 18 and over. By age cohort, 30.7% of residents were under the age of 20; 7.5% were between the ages of 20 and 24; 26.5% were from 25 to 44; and 23.0% were from 45 to 64.

Of the 654 households, 34.1% had children under the age of 18 living with them. Of all households, 56.1% were married-couple households, 6.7% were cohabiting-couple households, 19.6% had a female householder with no spouse or partner present, and 17.6% had a male householder with no spouse or partner present. About 28.6% of households were non-families, 23.7% were made up of individuals, and 6.2% had someone living alone who was 65 years of age or older.

There were 678 housing units, of which 3.5% were vacant. The homeowner vacancy rate was 1.6% and the rental vacancy rate was 4.9%. 0.0% of residents lived in urban areas and 100.0% lived in rural areas.

Racial composition as of the 2020 census
Race	Number	Percent
White	1,698	96.1%
Black or African American	4	0.2%
American Indian and Alaska Native	0	0.0%
Asian	4	0.2%
Native Hawaiian and Other Pacific Islander	0	0.0%
Some other race	35	2.0%
Two or more races	25	1.4%
Hispanic or Latino (of any race)	62	3.5%

=== 2010 census ===
As of the census of 2010, there were 1,537 people, 575 households, and 425 families residing in the city. The population density was 830.8 inhabitants per square mile (320.8/km^{2}). There were 586 housing units at an average density of 316.8 per square mile (122.3/km^{2}). The racial makeup of the city was 99.3% White, 0.1% African American, 0.3% from other races, and 0.3% from two or more races. Hispanic or Latino of any race were 1.0% of the population.

There were 575 households, of which 40.2% had children under the age of 18 living with them, 61.4% were married couples living together, 8.5% had a female householder with no husband present, 4.0% had a male householder with no wife present, and 26.1% were non-families. 22.1% of all households were made up of individuals, and 10.8% had someone living alone who was 65 years of age or older. The average household size was 2.67 and the average family size was 3.15.

The median age in the city was 33.8 years. 29.7% of residents were under the age of 18; 7.9% were between the ages of 18 and 24; 28.1% were from 25 to 44; 23.7% were from 45 to 64; and 10.9% were 65 years of age or older. The gender makeup of the city was 49.3% male and 50.7% female.

=== 2000 census ===
As of the census of 2000, there were 1,334 people, 491 households, and 365 families residing in the city. The population density was 948.8 inhabitants per square mile (366.3/km^{2}). There were 513 housing units at an average density of 364.9 per square mile (140.9/km^{2}). The racial makeup of the city was 98.88% White, 0.15% African American, 0.30% Native American, 0.45% Asian, 0.15% from other races, and 0.07% from two or more races. Hispanic or Latino of any race were 0.97% of the population.

There were 491 households, out of which 39.9% had children under the age of 18 living with them, 63.5% were married couples living together, 7.7% had a female householder with no husband present, and 25.5% were non-families. 23.8% of all households were made up of individuals, and 12.4% had someone living alone who was 65 years of age or older. The average household size was 2.71 and the average family size was 3.25.

30.3% are under the age of 18, 7.9% from 18 to 24, 30.2% from 25 to 44, 18.9% from 45 to 64, and 12.7% who were 65 years of age or older. The median age was 32 years. For every 100 females, there were 99.1 males. For every 100 females age 18 and over, there were 96.6 males.

The median income for a household in the city was $41,333, and the median income for a family was $48,854. Males had a median income of $32,328 versus $20,476 for females. The per capita income for the city was $17,186. About 4.5% of families and 5.3% of the population were below the poverty line, including 6.0% of those under age 18 and 5.7% of those age 65 or over.

== Law and government ==
The mayor of Farley is Jay Hefel. In the Iowa General Assembly, Farley is represented by Senator Tod Bowman (D-Maquoketa) in the Iowa Senate, and Representative Ray Zirkelbach (D-Monticello) in the Iowa House of Representatives. At the federal level, it is within Iowa's 1st congressional district, represented by Ashley Hinson (R) in the U.S. House of Representatives. Farley, and all of Iowa, are represented by U.S. Senators Chuck Grassley (R) and Joni Ernst (R).

== Education ==
All public school students living in Farley are zoned to schools in the Western Dubuque Community School District. Elementary school students are zoned to Drexler Elementary School (in Farley) for grades K-5. Middle school students are zoned to Drexler Middle School (also in Farley), and high school students are zoned to Western Dubuque High School, which is in nearby Epworth.

Wayne Drexler Elementary opened in 1993.

Like many other rural communities in Iowa, Farley also has a private school. Seton Catholic Elementary School- Farley is one of three buildings that comprise Seton Catholic Elementary School, and is affiliated with the Roman Catholic Archdiocese of Dubuque. For grades 1–2, students go to the building in Epworth, for grades 3–5, students attend the building in Peosta, Iowa, and for grades 6–8, students go to the building in Farley. For high school, parochial students attend Beckman High School in Dyersville, Iowa or Wahlert High School in Dubuque, Iowa.

== Notable people ==
- William John McGee (1853–1912), geologist, anthropologist, and archeologist
- Raymond Roseliep, poet, Catholic priest
