= Dubuque Regional Airport =

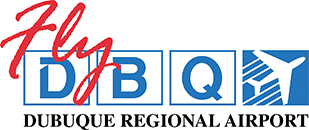

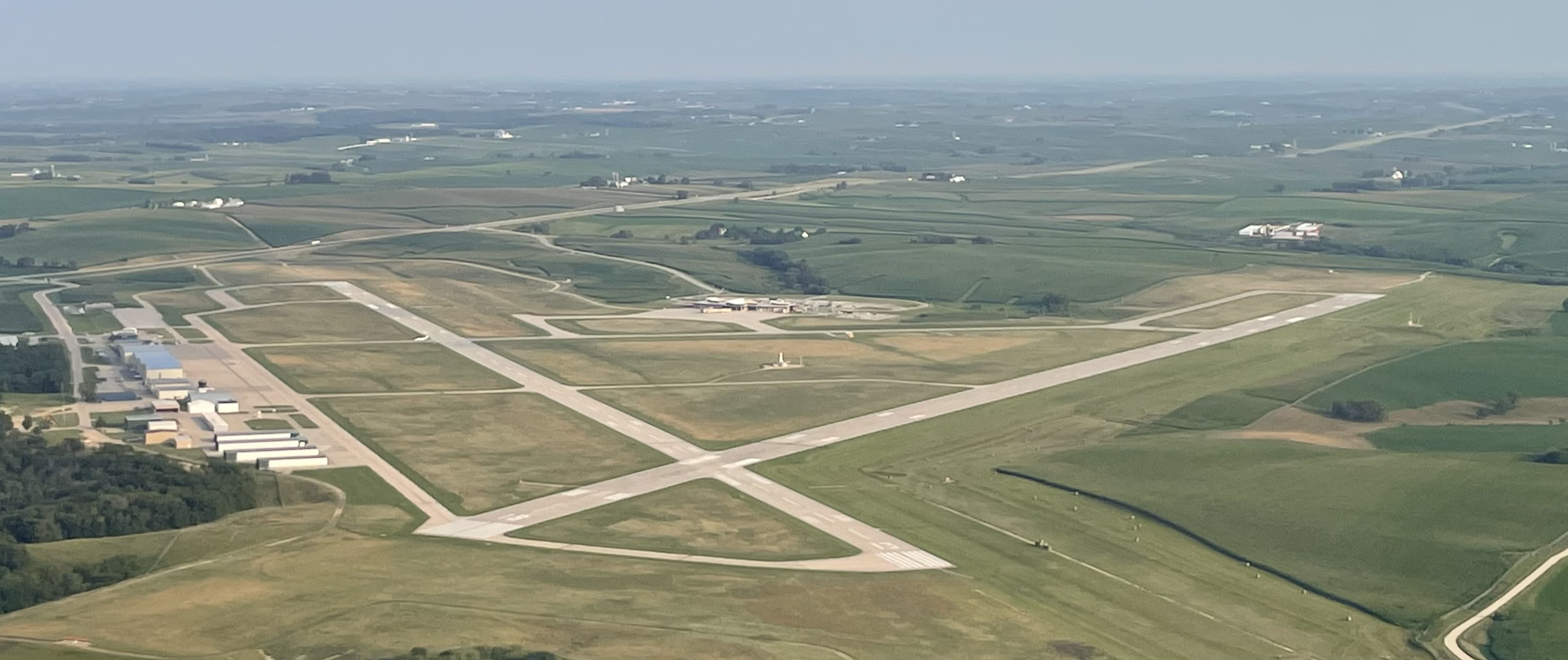
- IATA: DBQ; ICAO: KDBQ; FAA LID: DBQ

Summary
- Airport type: Public
- Owner/Operator: City of Dubuque
- Serves: Dubuque, Iowa
- Elevation AMSL: 1,077 ft (328 m)
- Coordinates: 42°24′07″N 090°42′34″W
- Website: www.FlyDBQ.com

Maps
- FAA airport diagram
- Interactive map of Dubuque Regional Airport

Runways
Direction	Length		Surface
Direction	ft	m	Surface
18/36	6,327	1,928	Concrete
13/31	6,502	1,982	Concrete

Statistics
- Aircraft operations (through 9/30/2022): 70,223
- Based aircraft (2022): 83
- Source: Federal Aviation Administration

Dubuque Regional Airport (IATA: DBQ, ICAO: KDBQ, FAA LID: DBQ) is a regional airport located eight miles south of Dubuque, in Dubuque County, Iowa. On U.S. Highway 61, the airport is owned by the city of Dubuque and is operated as a department of the city government. The city council appoints people for four-year terms to the Airport Commission board, which oversees the airport. For day-to-day operations, the commission hires an airport manager. The airport is used for general aviation and sees one airline. A charter service is run by Sun Country Airlines. The airport offers maintenance and refueling services, including service for jets.

The National Plan of Integrated Airport Systems for 2017–2021 categorized it as a primary commercial service facility. Federal Aviation Administration records say the airport had 42,870 passenger boardings (enplanements) in calendar year 2008, 39,359 in 2009, and 33,861 in 2010.

== History ==
An airport on Chaplain Schmitt Island was constructed in 1934, but was abandoned due to flooding.

The first airline flights at Dubuque were Mid-Continent DC-3s in 1950. In 1955 successor Braniff was replaced by Ozark, which pulled out its D-C9s and FH-227s in 1981.

Northwest Airlines announced on February 7, 2008, that its regional partner Mesaba Airlines (Northwest Airlink) would return to Dubuque with twice daily Saab 340s to Minneapolis-Saint Paul International Airport. These flights began on June 20, 2008. On July 2, 2009, the merged Delta/Northwest Airlines announced it would end service to Dubuque, leaving DBQ with one airline.

The 2013 Federal sequester would have resulted in the closure of the airport's control tower, but the Federal Aviation Administration ultimately reversed its decision.

As late as early 2020, American Eagle ERJ-145s flew to O'Hare International Airport in Chicago three times a day, yet reduced their schedule to one daily flight due to the COVID-19 pandemic. On September 6, 2022, American Eagle ended its last daily flight to the airport.

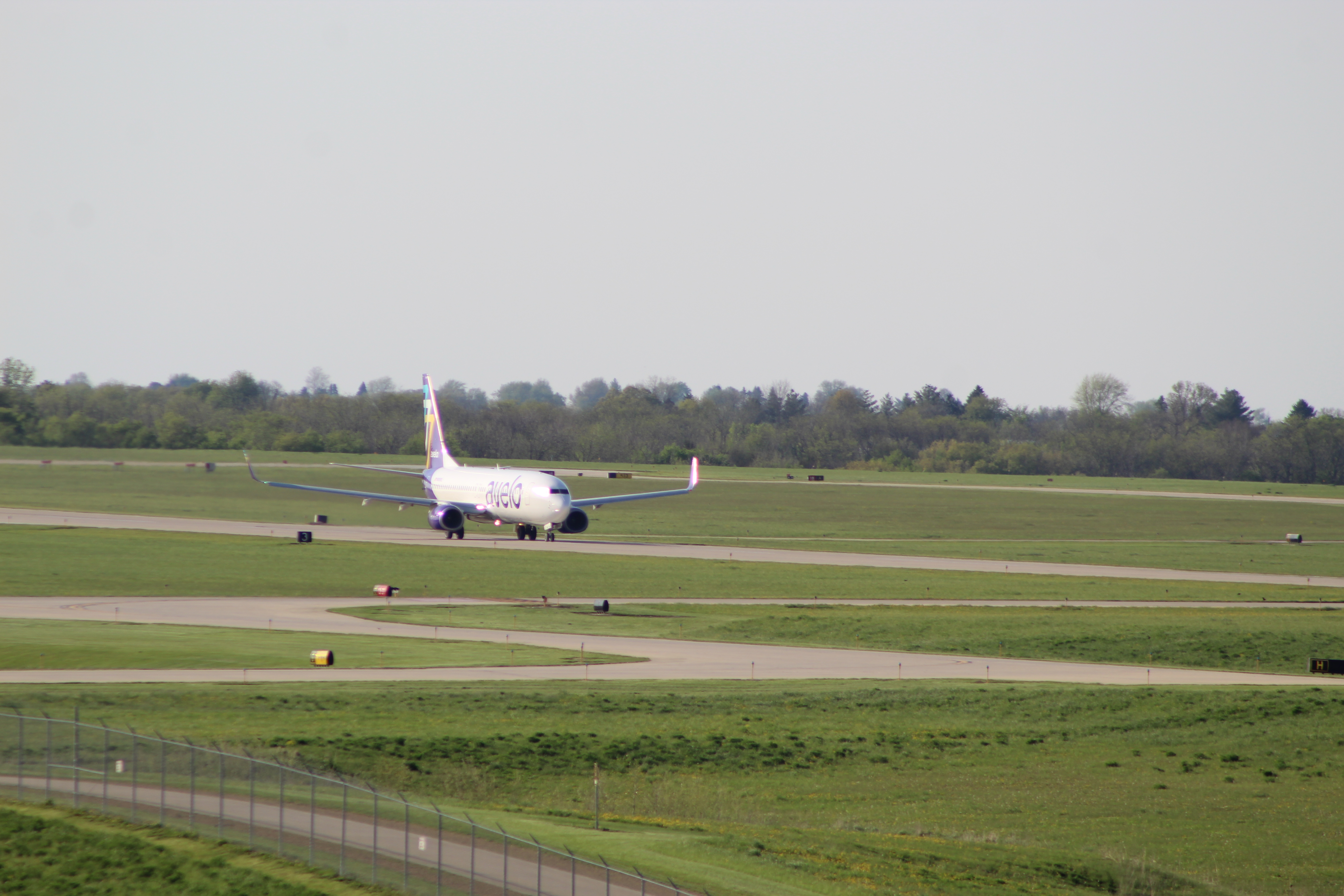
Avelo Airlines departing Dubuque's runway 13 for Orlando.

On November 3, 2022, Avelo Airlines and the Dubuque Regional Airport announced airline service to Orlando, Florida, using Boeing 737-800 aircraft. The flights started on March 22, 2023. Further, on September 13, they added a flight to Las Vegas. On November 1, 2023, Avelo Airlines and the airport announced that air service to Las Vegas, would be discontinued beginning January 6, 2024, as part of a national network reevaluation. On January 10, 2024, the Dubuque Regional Airport announced that Avelo Airlines will pause regular air service to Orlando and convert to seasonal air service as part of a company wide transition. In July 2024, Avelo announced they would not return to Dubuque citing aircraft availability and costs at Orlando.

On August 27, 2024, the airport announced the return of daily service to Chicago O'Hare International Airport with Denver Air Connection, starting November 4, 2024.

On December 15, 2025, the Dubuque City Council voted to direct the airport commission to end the service agreement with Denver Air, effective January 15, 2026.

== Facilities ==
Dubuque Regional Airport covers 1,240 acres (502 ha) at an elevation of 1,077 feet (328 m). It has two concrete runways: 18/36 is 6,327 by 150 feet (1,928 x 46 m) and 13/31 is 6,502 by 100 feet (1,982 x 30 m).

In the year ending September 30, 2022, the airport had 70,223 aircraft operations, an average of 192 per day: 97% general aviation, 3% air taxi, <1% military and <1% airline. In September 2022, 83 aircraft were based at the airport: 63 single-engine, 5 multi-engine, 12 jets and three helicopters.

The University of Dubuque has a flight operations center at the airport that provides for pilot training in the school's aviation programs. This includes ground school and actual flight training. The university has three hangars for their aircraft and a third hangar that is shared.

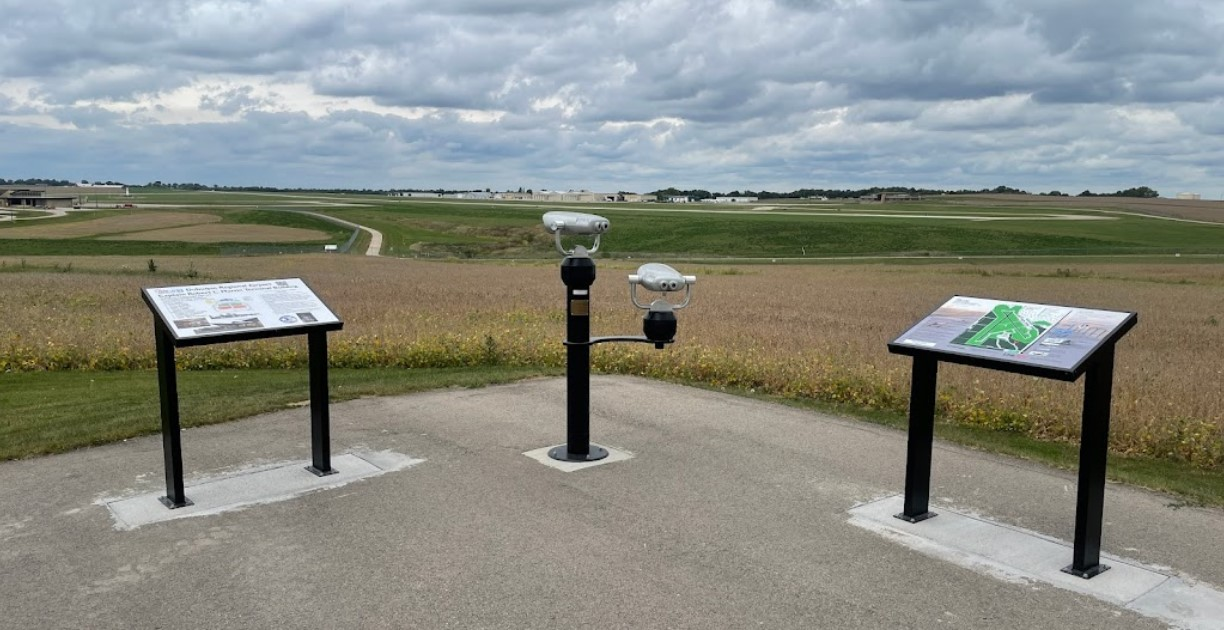
Photo of EAA Observation Area signage and binoculars.

The Experimental Aircraft Association (EAA) Chapter 327 is based at the airport. EAA Chapter 327 is a community organization that engages local pilots and the community in aviation related events. Pilots in this organization build aircraft under the experimental aircraft airworthiness certificate. EAA supports and sustains the observation area located on Aviation Drive just before the terminal as well as a hangar building on Airport Road.

The Key City Fliers is a flying club for local pilots to rent out single engine aircraft for personal enjoyment. The club's aircraft consist of a Piper Aircraft fleet. With the help of its members and volunteers in the club, the aircraft remain in great condition, ensuring its users can have access to safe, maintained, and a low-cost option for flying.

The Robert L. Martin Terminal has free Wi-Fi internet access. The airport installed enclosed walkways at the gates, allowing passengers to walk to the planes without going outdoors. The terminal has an ATM, vending machines, and gaming machines. On June 22, 2018, the airport lost its restaurant (The Hangar Bar & Grille), due to American Airlines reducing its flights at the airport. The terminal has three gates for airline passengers and a jet bridge. The terminal has a baggage carousel, desks for three airlines, and rental car services including Avis and Hertz. During the COVID-19 Pandemic, a new restaurant (All Onboard by Life's a Feast) provided food service in the terminal area.

== Safety ==
The airport has been recognized by the Federal Aviation Administration a number of times for its commitment to safety. It won the FAA's "Airport Safety Enhancement Award" in 1994, 1997, 2000, and 2003. In order to receive this honor, an airport must be free from discrepancies during an inspection for three consecutive years. In 2008, the Dubuque Regional Airport marked 18 consecutive years of perfect safety inspections in accordance with FAR Part 139. That record is unmatched among the approximately 600 certified U.S. airports.

=== Incidents and accidents ===
- On December 24, 1982, Piper PA-31 Navajo N4091U crashed on a back course approach to Runway 13 due to low visibility. The pilot and passenger were killed.
- On April 19, 1993, a Mitsubishi MU-2B-60 N86SD, owned by the state of South Dakota, suffered a catastrophic failure of the propeller hub on its left engine and crashed, while on approach, south of the community of Zwingle, Iowa. The crash killed all eight on board, including the governor of South Dakota, George S. Mickelson.
- On October 23, 2001, Beechcraft Baron 58 N7235R arriving from DuPage Airport crashed while on approach to Runway 31 due to ground fog. One fatality occurred.
- On March 8, 2004, Cessna 172R N105FS stalled after ice accumulated on the wings, causing a hard impact on landing. Three minor injuries were reported.
- On April 3, 2011, AmericanConnection flight 5019 bound to O'Hare International Airport sustained substantial damage after the jet bridge was blown into the side of the plane. Winds were gusting to 27 kts, and the emergency brakes in the jet bridge failed to activate. There were no injuries, and the aircraft was repaired and returned to service.
- On October 13, 2014, Piper PA-46 N9126V crashed on approach to the airport. As of October 18, 2014, it was unclear why the plane crashed, though low visibility was reported. One fatality occurred.

== Attempts at expansion ==
To update facilities and accommodate growth, the City of Dubuque announced plans in 2007 to build a new, larger terminal building. The new $23 million facility is part of the airport's master improvement plan; it opened on June 9, 2016. On July 21, 2020, Dubuque Regional Airport Commissioners voted unanimously to name the Dubuque Regional Airport Terminal Building after Captain Robert L. Martin.

While the city has expressed interest in courting more airlines, headwinds in the economy and airline staffing issues have hampered these efforts. Historically, Dubuque Regional had up to three air carriers. Two were eliminated following contractions in the airline industry related to the terrorist attacks on September 11, 2001. American Airlines said they would drop their flights in October 2018 due to financial difficulties and lower demand. In 2022, American Eagle announced its intentions to suspend its last flight offered to Dubuque, leaving the airport without scheduled commercial airline service. Local travelers need to travel to airports in neighboring cities such as Cedar Rapids, Madison, or the Quad Cities; the nearest major hub airport is Chicago O'Hare, which is a three-hour drive away. As noted above, airline service to Chicago O'Hare by Denver Air Connection resumed in November 2024.

== See also ==
- Dubuque, Iowa
- List of airports in Iowa
- The Jule
- Dubuque station
- Dubuque Intermodal Transportation Center
