= Lake Peosta Channel =

Coordinates: 42.518°N 90.651°W

- Lake Peosta, Peosta Channel
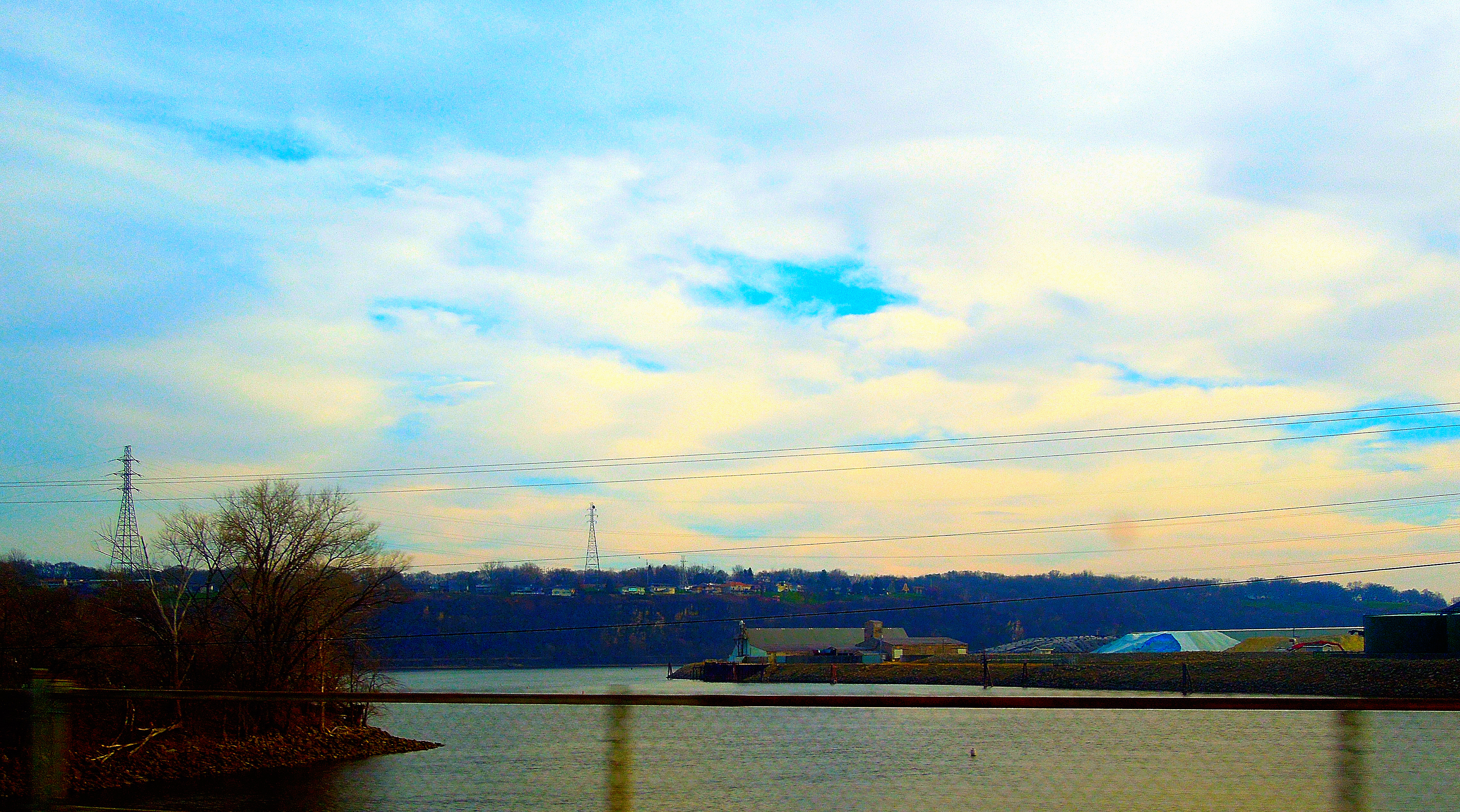
- Lake Peosta Channel visible at the bottom of the image
- Interactive map of Lake Peosta Channel
- Location: Dubuque, Iowa
- Type: River channel
- Part of: Mississippi River
- Basin countries: United States

Lake Peosta Channel, or simply Lake Peosta or Peosta Channel, is a branch of the Mississippi River in Dubuque, Iowa. It separates Chaplain Schmitt Island from the mainland. Flooding events have built up a ridge of sediment near the mouth of the channel as a result of silting. In 1875, Lake Peosta Channel was where modern Kerper Boulevard is.

US 151/61 crosses the channel.

In 1948, Lake Peosta Channel had its dams removed. Petitions were floated to force the city to remove them. In the 1950s, a boat harbor was dredged out from Lake Peosta Channel.

== See also ==
- Bee Branch Creek – a creek that outflows nearby
- O'Leary Lake – a lake to the north
- Frentress Lake – another lake, but to the south
