= Barry Masteller =

American abstract painter and photographer

Barry G. Masteller
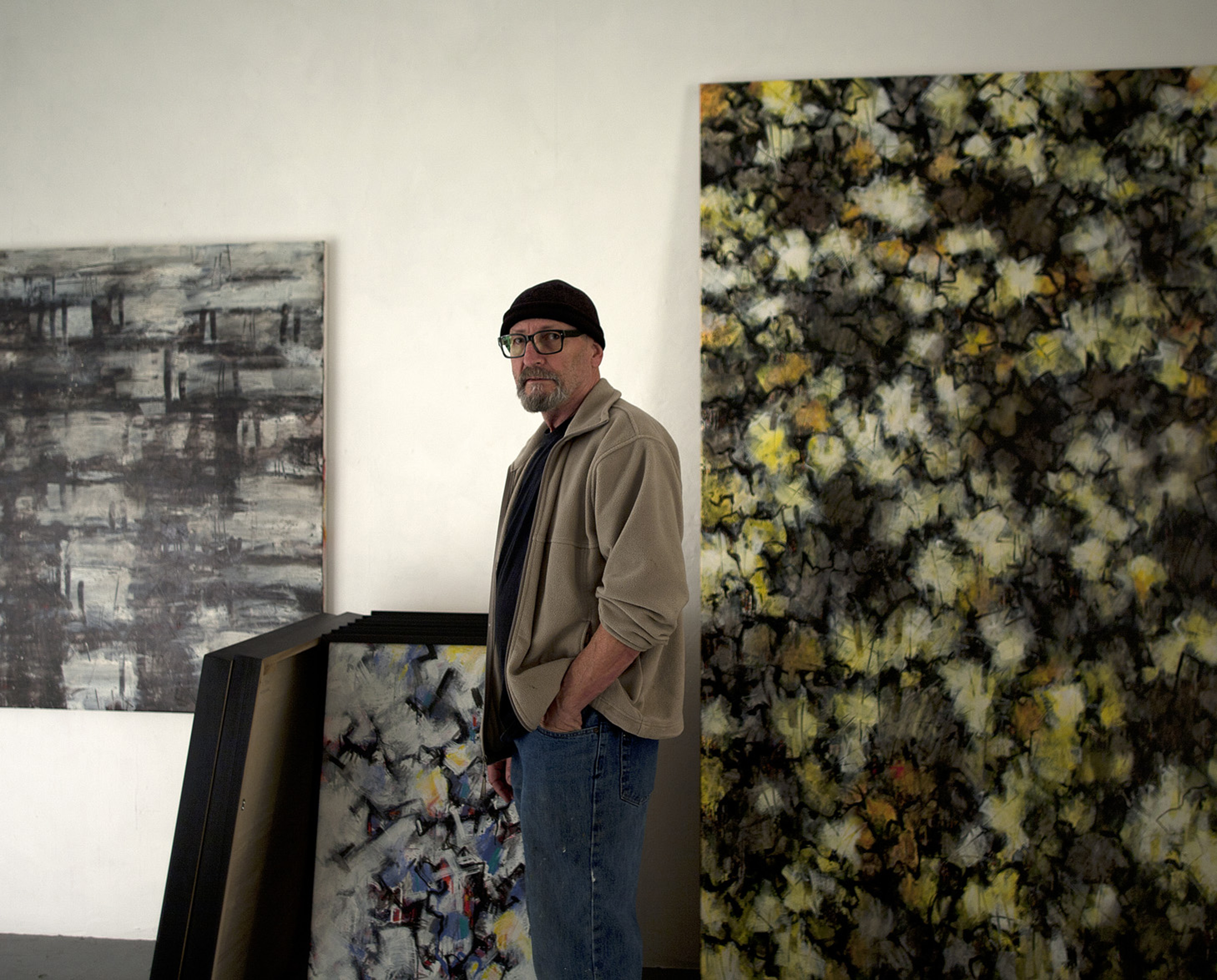
- Barry Masteller in his Studio, 2015
- Born: April 21, 1945 (age 80); Los Angeles, California

Barry G. Masteller (born April 21, 1945) is an American abstract painter and photographer.

== Early life ==
Masteller was born in 1945 in Los Angeles California and grew up in the Silver Lake district. He began painting as a teen and is mostly self-taught.

== Solo exhibitions ==
- 2015 Bridges and Echoes. Triton Museum of Art, Santa Clara, California
- 2013 Along the Way. Hartnell College Art Gallery, Salinas, California
- 2010 US Embassy, Kathmandu, Nepal
- 2009 Boulevards. Elenor D. Wilson Museum of Art, Hollins University
- 2007 Earth + Sky. The Grace Museum, Abilene, Texas
- 2007 Imagined Journeys. Wiregrass Museum of Art, Dothan, Alabama
- 2007 Cityscapes. Dubuque Museum of Art, Dubuque, Iowa
- 2007 Recent Work. Caldwell Snyder Gallery, San Francisco
- 2006 Monterey Now. Monterey Museum of Art
- 2006 Landscapes. Campton Gallery, New York
- 2006 Mythical Landscapes. Museum of the Southwest, Midland, Texas
- 2006 Recent Paintings. Patricia Rovzar Gallery, Seattle, Washington

== Collections ==
- Crocker Art Museum, Sacramento, CA
- California State Senate Contemporary California Art Collection
- San Jose Museum of Art
- Monterey Museum of Art
- Santa Cruz Museum of Art and History
- Triton Museum of Art
- Palm Springs Art Museum
