= Threlkeld (surname) =

Threlkeld is a surname. Notable people with the surname include:

- Caleb Threlkeld (1676–1728), Irish botanist
- Dale Threlkeld, American artist
- Eleanor Threlkeld (born 1998), English cricketer
- Lancelot Threlkeld (1788–1859), English missionary, primarily in Australia
- Oscar Threlkeld (born 1994), English footballer
- Richard Threlkeld (1937–2012), American television news correspondent
