= Chaplain Schmitt Island =

Island in Dubuque, Iowa, United States

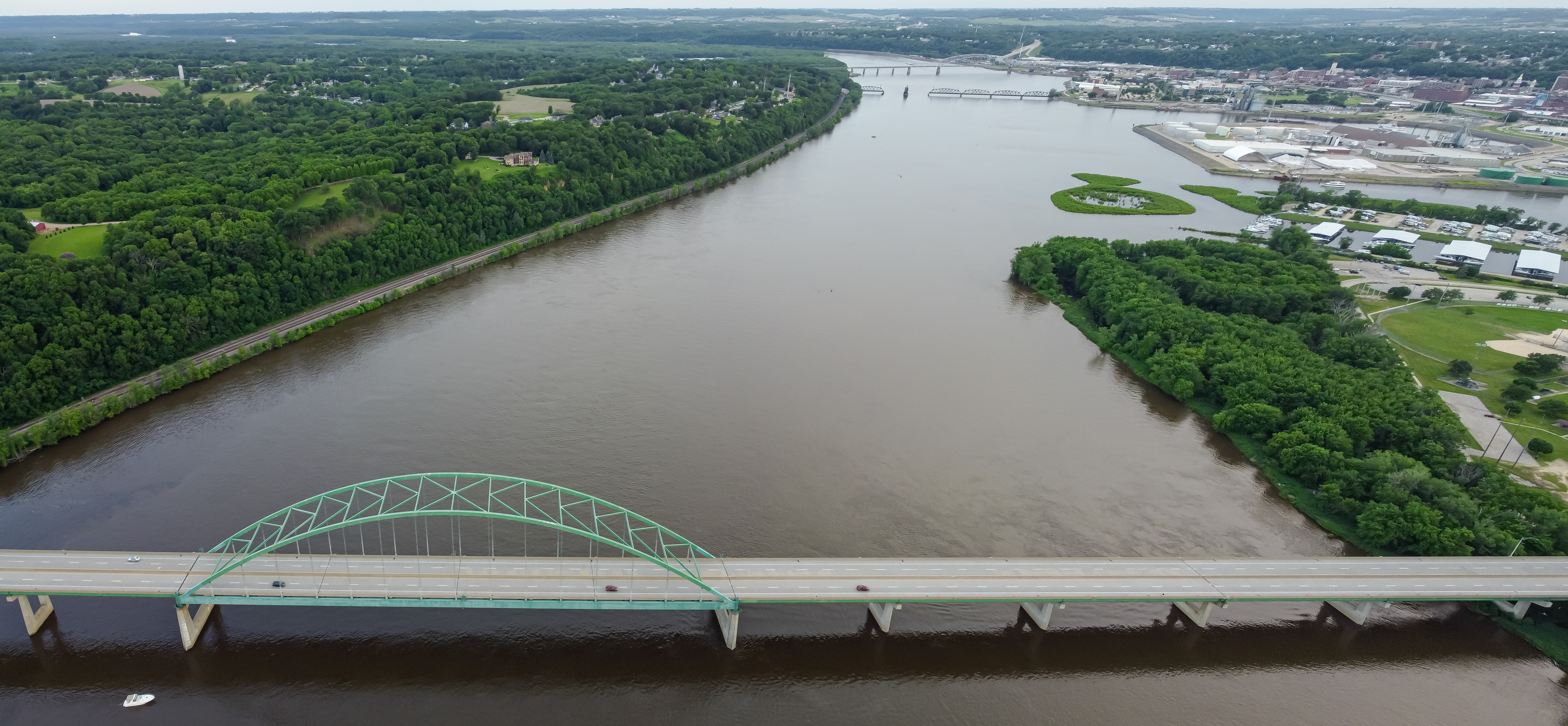
- The Mississippi as it passes through Dubuque. Chaplain Schmitt Island is visible to the right of the image

Geography
- Location: Mississippi River
- Coordinates: 42.515°N 90.645°W

Chaplain Schmitt Island, also known as City Island or Ham Island, is a river island of the Mississippi River in Dubuque, Iowa. It is separated from mainland Iowa by Lake Peosta Channel. The Q Casino and Dubuque Yacht Basin are located on the island. A memorial in the shape of a spiral with a pond containing a replica of the battleship USS Oklahoma is found on the island.

== Name ==
Chaplain Schmitt Island was named after Aloysius Schmitt, who died during the attack on Pearl Harbor. Ham Island (among variants) comes from Mathias Ham's ownership of the island.

== History ==
In 1875, the island was two spits of land in the Mississippi. Mathias Ham would come to own most of the island, becoming known as Ham Island.

The island hosted an airport on it built and opened in 1934. The airport would be abandoned due to flooding issues and Dubuque Regional Airport would be built to the south of Dubuque in 1948. The island subsequently hosted a dump on it for two decades before being closed in August 1976.

== See also ==
- Credit Island – similarly developed island in Davenport, Iowa
- Nine-Mile Island (Mississippi River) – nearby river island
