= Nine Mile Island =

Nine Mile Island may refer to:

- Nine-Mile Island (Mississippi River), an Upper Mississippi River island near Dubuque, Iowa
- Ninemile Island (Pennsylvania), an Allegheny River island near Blawnox, Pennsylvania
- Nine Mile Island State Natural Area, a Chippewa River island near Durand, Wisconsin
