= DITC (disambiguation) =

D.I.T.C. is an American hip hop collective.

DITC may also refer to:

- D.I.T.C. (album), a studio album by D.I.T.C.
- Dubuque Intermodal Transportation Center, an American transport hub
