= Andrew–Ryan House =

Historic house in Iowa, United States

- U.S. National Register of Historic Places
- U.S. Historic district – Contributing property
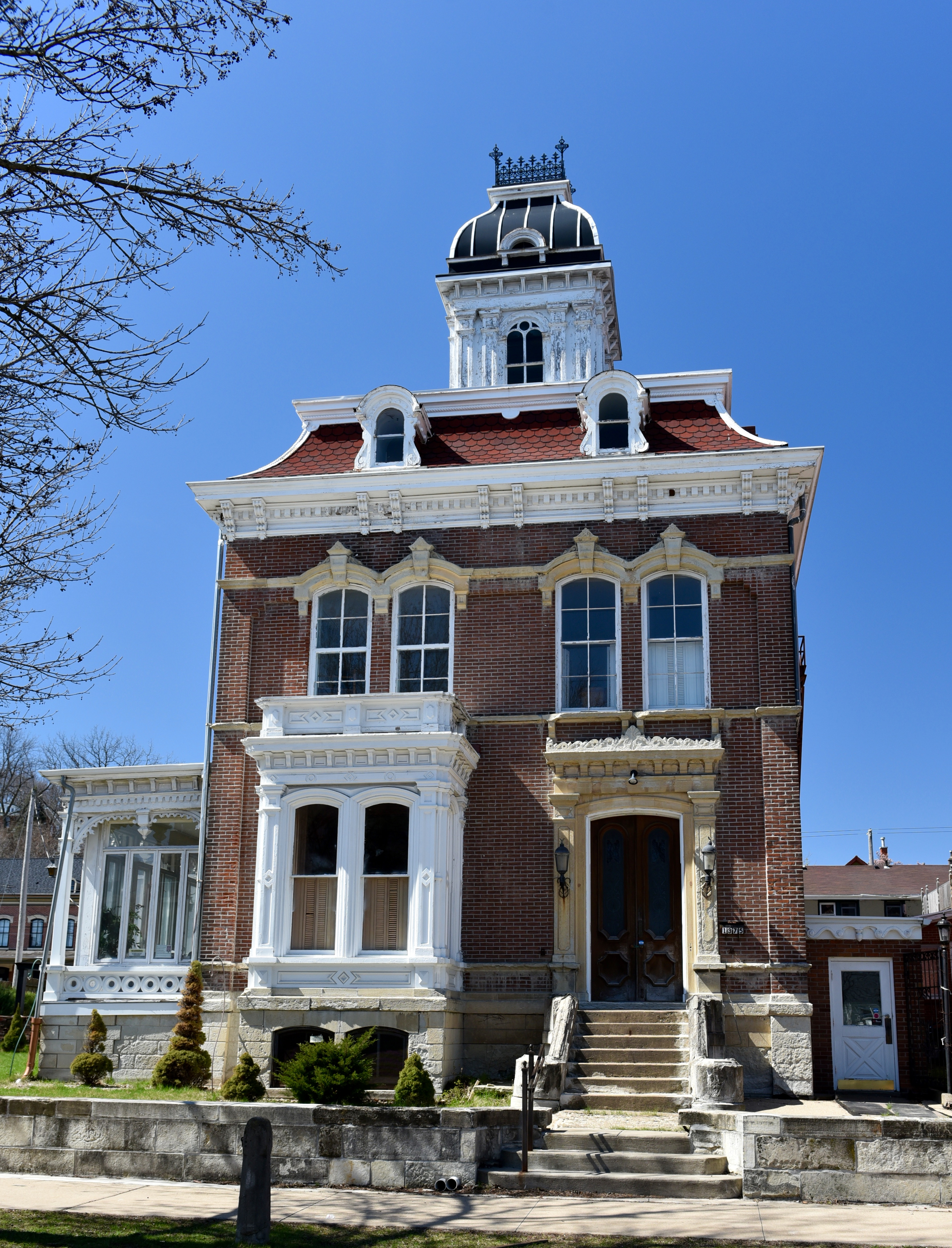

- Location within Iowa Location within the United States
- Location: 1375 Locust St., Dubuque, Iowa
- Coordinates: 42°30′18″N 90°40′16″W
- Area: less than one acre
- Built: 1873
- Built by: Ora Holland
- Architect: Fridolin J. Herr Sr.
- Architectural style: Second Empire
- Part of: Jackson Park Historic District (ID86002102)
- NRHP reference No.: 85000720
- Added to NRHP: April 11, 1985

The Andrew–Ryan House is a historic house located in Dubuque, Iowa, United States. This is considered the best example of the Second Empire style in the city, and one of finest in the state of Iowa. The two-story brick structure was designed by Dubuque architect Fridolin J. Herr Sr. It was originally built 13 feet (4.0 m) to the north, but was moved to its present location between 1885 and 1890. The porches on the south side may have been added at that time. The house is from the high Second Empire style and features a mansard roof, arched windows, dominant chimneys, a prominent belvedere, and classical moldings on the pilasters, belt courses, and stone work.

The house was individually listed on the National Register of Historic Places in 1985. It was included as a contributing property in the Jackson Park Historic District in 1986.
