= Saint Patrick's Church (Dubuque, Iowa) =

- St. Patrick's Catholic Church and Rectory
- U.S. National Register of Historic Places
- U.S. Historic district – Contributing property
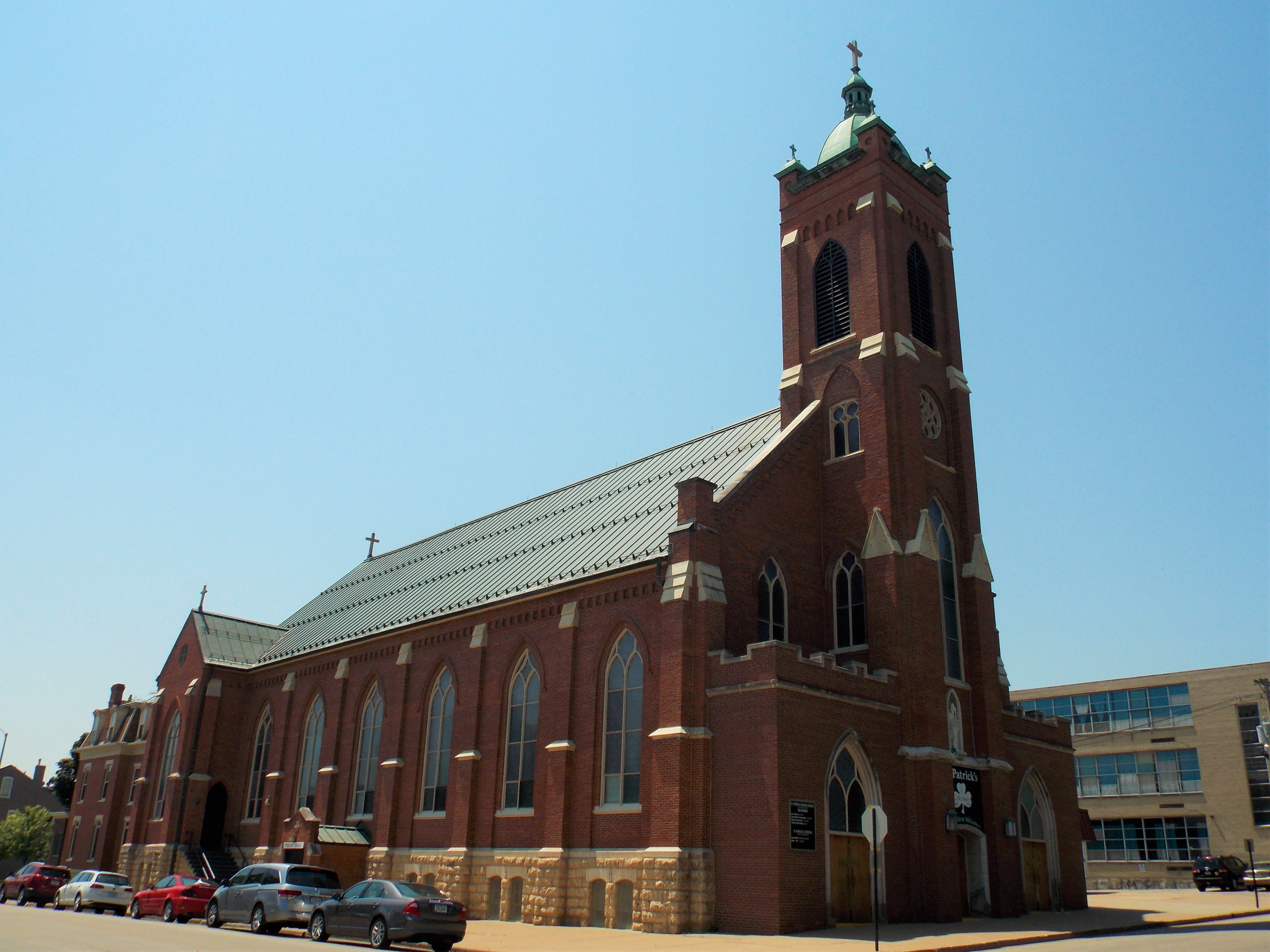

- Location within Iowa Location within the United States
- Location: 110 W. 15th St., 1425 Iowa St., Dubuque, Iowa
- Coordinates: 42°30′23.37″N 90°40′9.04″W
- Built: 1877-1878 (church); 1880s (rectory)
- Architect: John Keenan (church)
- Architectural style: Gothic Revival (church); Second Empire (rectory)
- Part of: Jackson Park Historic District
- NRHP reference No.: 86002102
- Added to NRHP: July 31, 1986

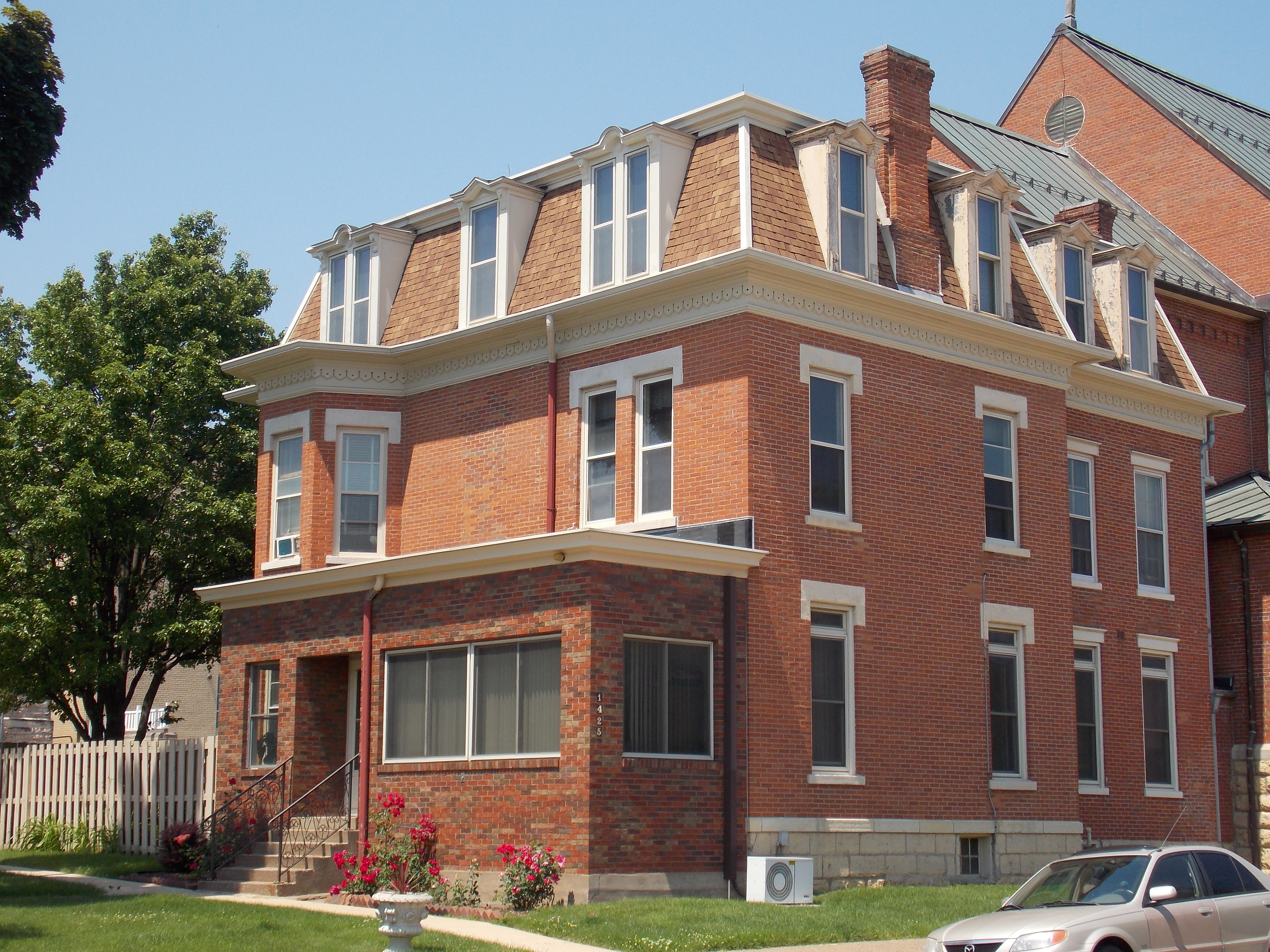
Rectory

It was founded in 1852 as a mission of Saint Raphael Cathedral. Saint Patrick's Church is a Catholic parish in the Archdiocese of Dubuque, and is located at 15th and Iowa Streets, Dubuque, Iowa, United States. The church and rectory were included as contributing properties in the Jackson Park Historic District that was listed on the National Register of Historic Places in 1986.

== Architecture ==
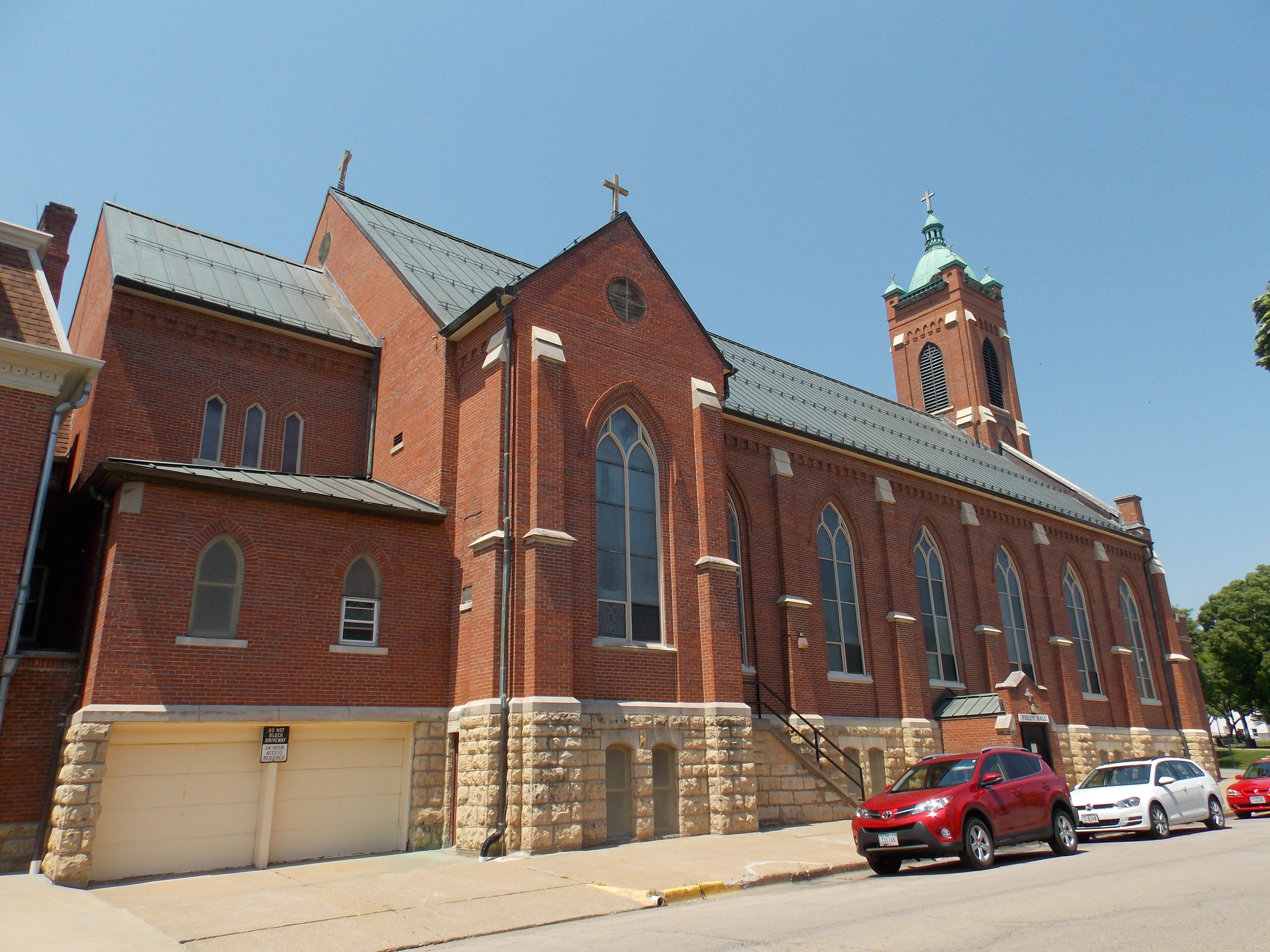
A view of the church from behind

Saint Patrick's Church was designed by Dubuque architect John Keenan in the Gothic Revival style. It is a brick structure built on a Dubuque stone foundation. It features a central tower that is capped with a crown. The main entrance has been altered in subsequent years, but it fits in with the older structure. The church building is seven bays long with the seventh bay on the south end forming a sort of transept. The bays are divided by brick buttresses and each bay contains a paired lancet window. The interior is divided into three naves.

The rectory was built in the 1880s to the rear of the church. It is a three-story brick residence capped with a mansard roof. The original porch has been replaced with a single-story addition. Other additions have also been added on the west side of the house.

A school building, no longer extant, was built immediately west of the church. It was replaced by a three-story structure in 1951 on the corner of West 15th and Main Streets. The parish sold the building in 2006. It is not considered an historic structure.
