= Dubuque Museum of Art =

Established 1987 in Iowa

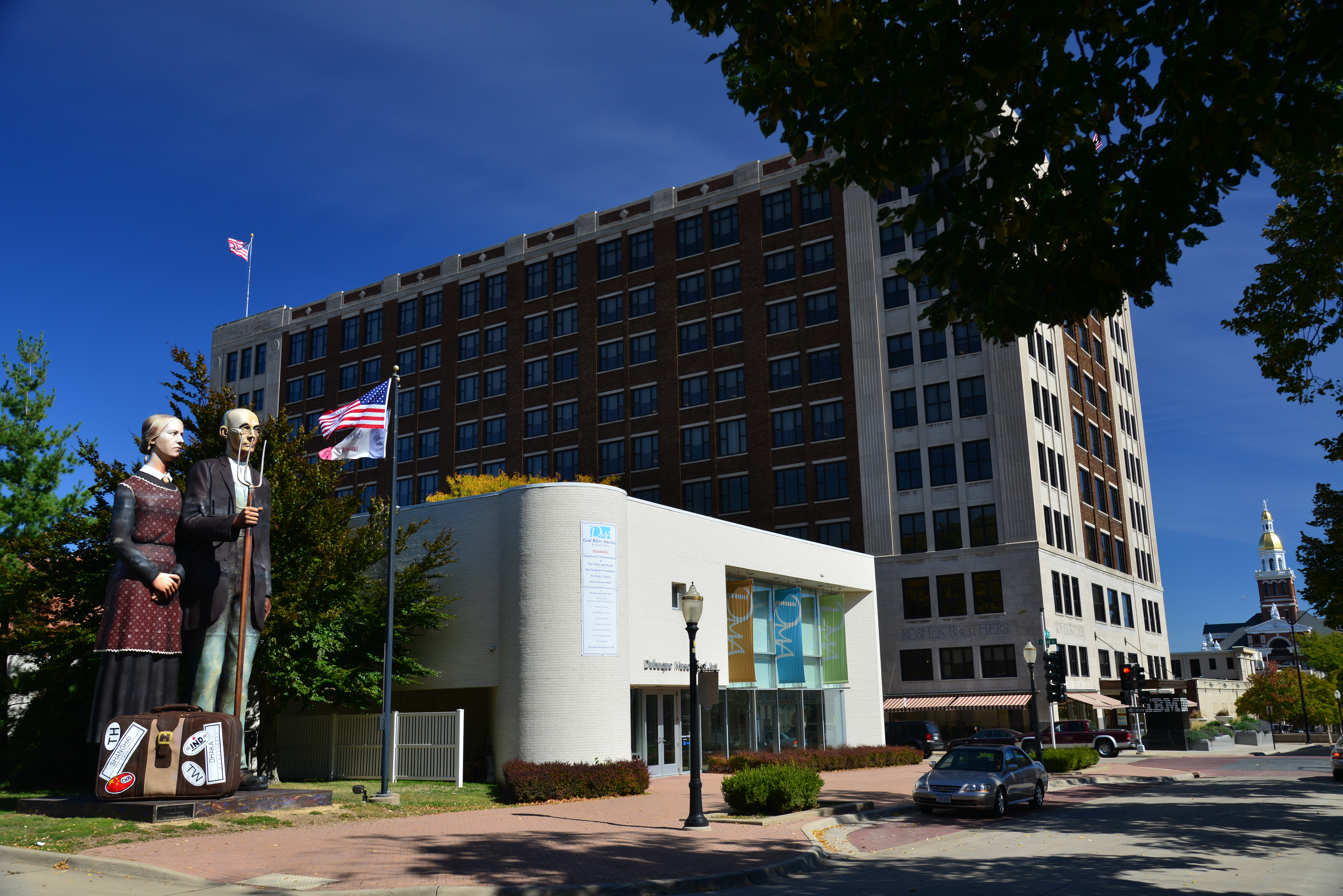
- Dubuque Museum of Art, photographed 2012
- Established: 1987
- Location: 701 Locust St, Dubuque, Iowa, USA
- Coordinates: 42.4998°N 90.6682°W
- Type: Art museum
- Public transit access: Blue Orange The Jule

The Dubuque Museum of Art is an art museum in Dubuque, Iowa. The museum is known for its collection of works by Grant Wood. The collections include more than 2,500 works of art housed in the former Statesman Bank building in downtown Dubuque. The museum was founded in 1987, although it evolved out of the Dubuque Art Association which had been operating sporadically since 1874.

== Dubuque Art Association ==
The Dubuque Art Association was founded in 1874 with the aim of collecting and presenting artwork in the city. From its origin, the association was concerned with collecting images and artworks that depicted Dubuque and the surrounding area. Many prominent citizens were part of the association including journalists, businessmen, educators, and artists. Early members included Dennis Mahony and Alexander Simplot, among others.

The association began putting on exhibitions as early as 1874 and facilitating art collecting in the community. Around 1904, the Dubuque Arts Association disbanded and donated its collection to the Dubuque Public Library. It was reformed in 1910 under the collector, organizer, and educator Kate Keith Van Duzee. Meetings and events continued to be held at the Dubuque Public Library, which moved to its Carnegie-Stout building in 1902.

The Art Association had a number of locations during the 20th century and continued to grow in membership. The organization obtained their first gallery space in 1983 when they took over the old county jail that was vacant. This was done with the support of Dubuque Mayor C. Robert Justmann.

== History ==
The museum was established in 1987 by the Dubuque Art Association. The first major exhibition was a retrospective of Dubuque-area artist Francesco Licciardi's work. The museum was housed in the old county jail alongside the Art Association for its first few years, at which time the administration realized they could not meet American Association of Museums standards in that building. The museum purchased the former Statesman Bank building in 1998 and renovated the space to meet museum standards. Architect Joan Sorano oversaw the renovation. In 1996, the Dubuque Art Association officially changed its name to the Dubuque Museum of Art, despite operating as a museum since 1987. The renovation of the new building was completed in 1999. The museum was accredited by the American Alliance of Museums in 2005. Recent years have seen extensive fundraising through grants and an expansion is expected in the near future.

== Collections ==
The collection of the Dubuque Museum of Art is focused primarily on the work of artists from the region. The museum holds at least 38 works by the famous Iowa artist Grant Wood, including significant paintings. The collection also includes hundreds of works by Arthur Geisert, an artist and illustrator of children's books. The museum has collected a significant amount of works by Edward S. Curtis, including a full run of photogravures from his famous book "The North American Indian." The museum has many other works in the collection, especially works by artists from the region or that depict the Dubuque area.
