= Carnegie-Stout Public Library =

Public library in Dubuque, Iowa, US

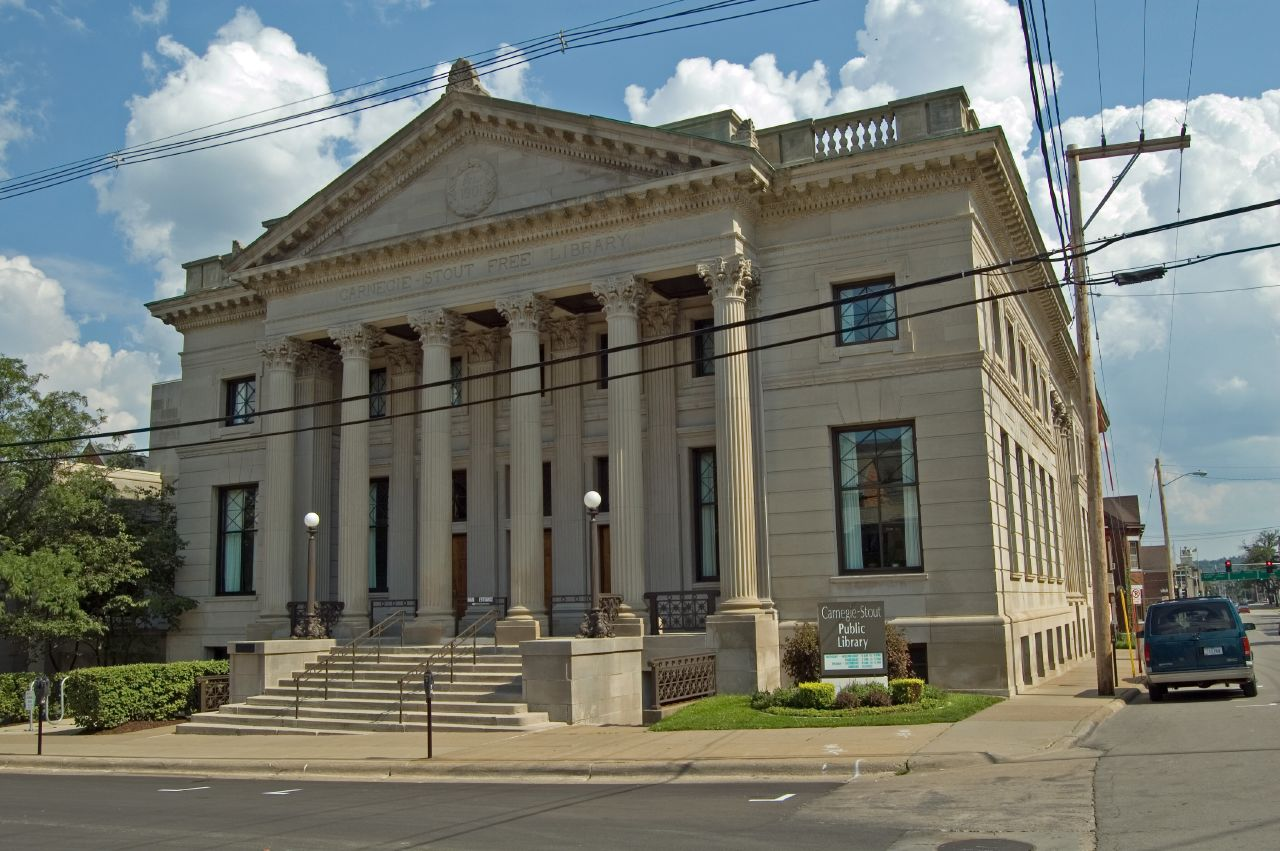
- Location: 360 W. 11th St. Dubuque, Iowa, United States
- Type: Public

Other information
- Public transit access: Blue Orange The Jule
- Website: carnegiestout.org
- Carnegie-Stout Public Library
- U.S. National Register of Historic Places
- U.S. Historic district – Contributing property
- Location within Iowa Location within the United States
- Coordinates: 42°30′09″N 90°40′12″W
- Area: less than one acre
- Built: 1901–1902
- Architect: W .G. Williamson; John Spencer
- Architectural style: Beaux-Arts
- Part of: Jackson Park Historic District
- NRHP reference No.: 75000684
- Added to NRHP: August 1, 1975

The Carnegie-Stout Public Library is located in Dubuque, Iowa, United States. The public library had its beginnings with the Young Men's Literary Association, established in 1859, and their book collection was the basis for the library's collection. The books were housed in a variety of buildings over the years. The community applied for a grant from Andrew Carnegie who on January 12, 1901, contributed $71,500 to build the library building. Local businessman Frank D. Stout donated the property, which was worth $20,000, in honor of his father Henry L. Stout. The two-story Bedford stone and brick building was designed by Chicago architects W. G. Williamson and John Spencer. It is considered one of the finest examples of the Classical tradition of Beaux-Arts architecture in Iowa. The main facade is dominated by a Roman Corinthian portico that was modeled after the Pantheon in Rome. Its fluted columns are matched with pilasters on the wall behind. The building was dedicated on October 17, 1902, and it opened three days later. It was individually listed on the National Register of Historic Places in 1975, and it was included as a contributing property in the Jackson Park Historic District in 1986. An addition was added to the east side of the building in 1981.
