= Nine-Mile Island (Mississippi River) =

Island in Mississippi River between Illinois and Iowa

Nickname: Shinkles Island
- Interactive map of Nine-Mile Island

Geography
- Location: Upper Mississippi River
- Coordinates: 42°26′10″N 90°34′30″W
- Area: 454 acres (184 ha)
- Length: 2 mi (3 km)
- Width: .5 mi (0.8 km)

Administration
- United States
- State: Iowa

Nine-Mile Island is a river island located in Mosalem Township, Dubuque County, Iowa, between Dubuque, Iowa and Bellevue, Iowa on the Upper Mississippi River.

== Geography ==
Nine-Mile Island is situated within Pool 12 of the Upper Mississippi River, between Locks and Dams Nos. 11 and 12. The head (northwestern end) of the island is at UMR river mile 574.3, with the southeastern end at mile 571.5. It is about 2 miles long and .5 mile at its widest point, with a total area of 454 acres. Within the island is a lake called Green Lake.

The island is immediately downriver from Frentress Lake, site of a popular marina in East Dubuque, Illinois. It is adjacent to the unincorporated community of Massey, Iowa, which houses marina facilities. The island is bordered on the southwest by Molo Slough and on the northeast by the USACE's nine-foot navigation channel. Since it is on the Mississippi River, Nine-Mile Island is on the extreme eastern side of Iowa, adjacent to its border with Illinois.

The USACE also maintains two aids to navigation on the island: Nine-Mile Island Daybeacon at UMR river mile 573.5, and Nine-Mile Island Light at mile 571.5, both on the right descending bank.

== History ==
The island's name comes from the fact that its head is located nine river miles below Eagle Point (42.535°N 90.645°W). It was also historically known as Shinkles Island, as evidenced by the Army Corps' Shinkles Island Bar Daybeacon at UMR mile 574.1 on the left descending bank (Illinois side of the river).

The island was also the site of a steamboat race in 1885 between the Dan Thayer and Clyde.

== Conservation ==
Nine-Mile Island is densely forested, save for a sandy beach at the head of the island which is popular with vacationers. The area is characterized by numerous sloughs and backwaters, and the island surrounds Horseshoe Lake and Green Lake. Classified as public land, the island is part of both the Upper Mississippi River National Wildlife and Fish Refuge and the Driftless Area National Wildlife Refuge.

Prior to the construction of dams on the Upper Mississippi, thousands of wingdams regulated the flow of the river. Multiple remnants of these common structures are still present near the island. There is also a 1/2-mile revetment on the north side of the island and a 1/4-mile revetment on the southeastern end.

== Recreation ==
Since the island is just southeast of the Dubuque metropolitan area, it is a popular destination for boaters and picnickers. There are no roads on the island. Boats must be careful not to drop anchor at the head of the island, since there is an underground natural gas pipeline buried there, formerly owned by Enron Gas Pipeline Co.
