= Jackson Park Historic District (Dubuque, Iowa) =

Historic district in Iowa, United States

- U.S. National Register of Historic Places
- U.S. Historic district
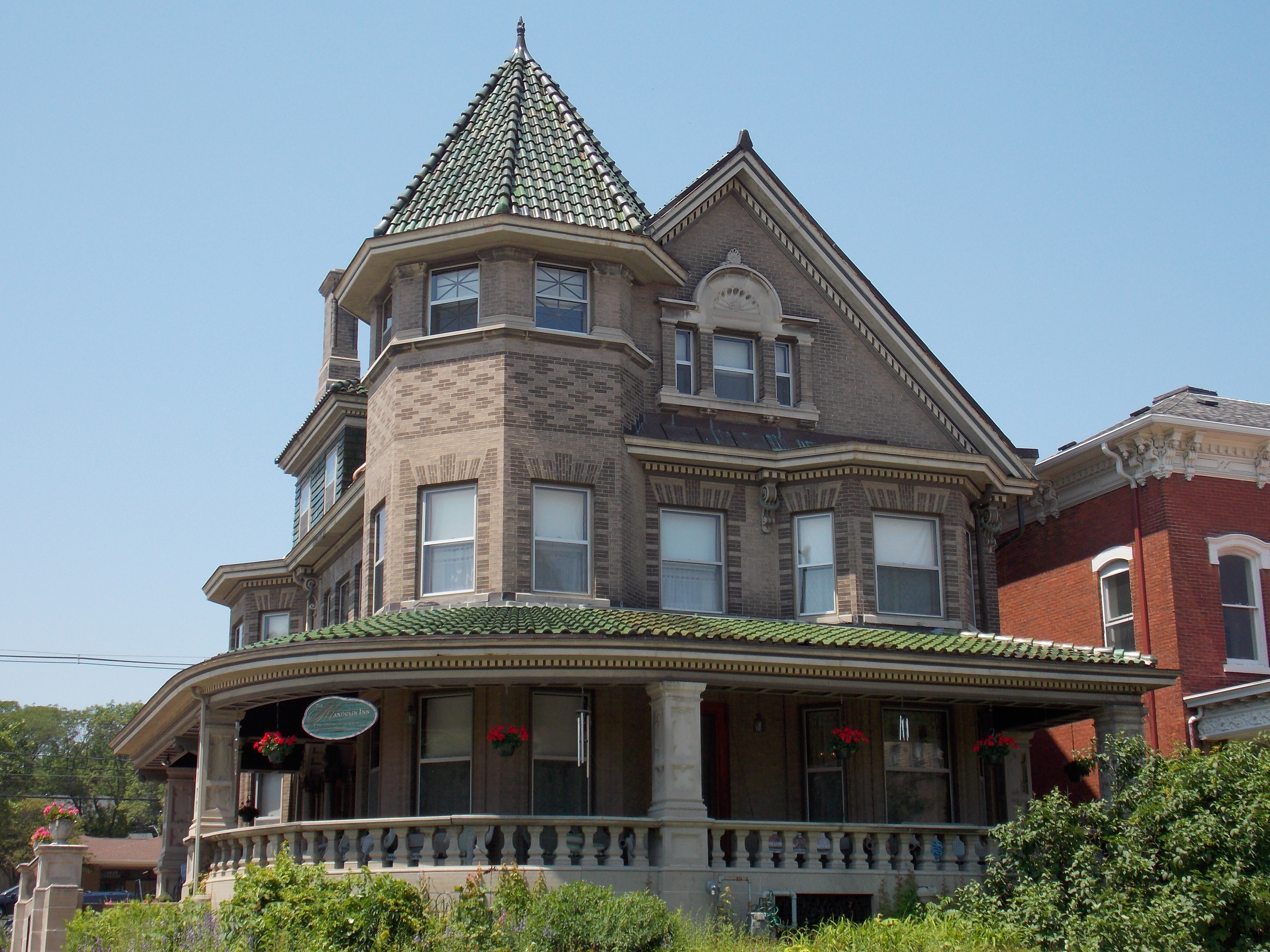
- The Schrup Residence

- Location within Iowa Location within the United States
- Location: Roughly bounded by 17th, Iowa, 10th and 9th, and Bluff and Montrose Sts., Dubuque, Iowa
- Coordinates: 42°30′21″N 90°40′12″W
- Area: 52 acres (21 ha)
- Architect: Fridolin J. Heer; F.J. Heer, Jr., Et al.
- Architectural style: Second Empire; Queen Anne
- NRHP reference No.: 86002102
- Added to NRHP: July 31, 1986

Jackson Park Historic District is a nationally recognized historic district located in Dubuque, Iowa, United States. It was listed on the National Register of Historic Places in 1986. This is primarily a residential area, with some institutional and commercial buildings, located north of the central business district. The city originally developed just to the south of here. The Cathedral Historic District represents the oldest residential neighborhood in Dubuque, and began to house the working-class people closer to the docks. Once the Jackson Park area opened for development the city's wealthier residents built their homes here. Architectural styles rang from the vernacular, which are found mainly along the bluff, to the high style found mainly along Main and Locust Streets. Most of the houses were built from the mid to the late 19th century. The Andrew-Ryan House (1873) was individually listed on the National Register. Most of the institutional architecture are churches, which include St. John's Episcopal Church (1878) and St. Patrick's Catholic Church (1878). Central High School, no longer extant, was located across from Jackson Park, and it was also individually listed on the National Register before its demise. The Carnegie-Stout Public Library (1902) is located on the south side of the district.
