= Dubuque Municipal Airport =

- IATA: none; ICAO: none

Summary
- Owner: City of Dubuque
- Location: Dubuque, Iowa
- Opened: 1934
- Interactive map of Dubuque Municipal Airport

Dubuque Municipal Airport was an airport located on Chaplain Schmitt Island in Dubuque, Iowa. The city bought the land for $10,000. A highway connected the airport to the mainland.

== History ==
In 1934, the airport served its first passengers, including Mayor of Dubuque M. R. Kane. Flooding in 1938 inundated the airport as the Mississippi River crested to 20.5 feet (6.2 m). In 1943, a B-24-D bomber of the United States Armed Forces landed at Dubuque after running out of fuel on its way to Sioux City. It managed to land without accident, even though the runways were too short for it.

=== Replacement ===
The airport was abandoned due to flooding. Fog also presented a hazard for landings. Dubuque Regional Airport would be built to the south of Dubuque to replace the one on Chaplain Schmitt Island. In September 1948, the Airport Manager recommended that the airport on the island be closed.

== Infrastructure ==
A highway made 16 feet (4.9 m) above the base level of the Mississippi River was constructed, connecting the airport.
