= St. John's Episcopal Church (Dubuque, Iowa) =

- U.S. National Register of Historic Places
- U.S. Historic district – Contributing property
- The church in 2021

- Location within Iowa Location within the United States
- Location: 1410 Main Street; Dubuque, Iowa
- Coordinates: 42°30′21.78″N 90°40′10.51″W
- Area: less than one acre
- Built: 1875-1878
- Architect: Henry M. Congdon
- Architectural style: Gothic Revival
- Part of: Jackson Park Historic District
- NRHP reference No.: 86002102
- Added to NRHP: July 31, 1986

St. John's Episcopal Church is a parish of the Diocese of Iowa, located in Dubuque, Iowa, United States. The church was included as a contributing property in the Jackson Park Historic District that was listed on the National Register of Historic Places in 1986.

In 2015, the church reported 176 members; in 2023, it reported 176 members. No membership statistics were reported in 2024 national parochial reports. Plate and pledge financial support reported by the church in 2024 was $102,220. Average Sunday Attendance (ASA) reported in 2024 was 52 persons. This was a relative decrease from ASA of 65 persons reported in 2015.

== History and building ==
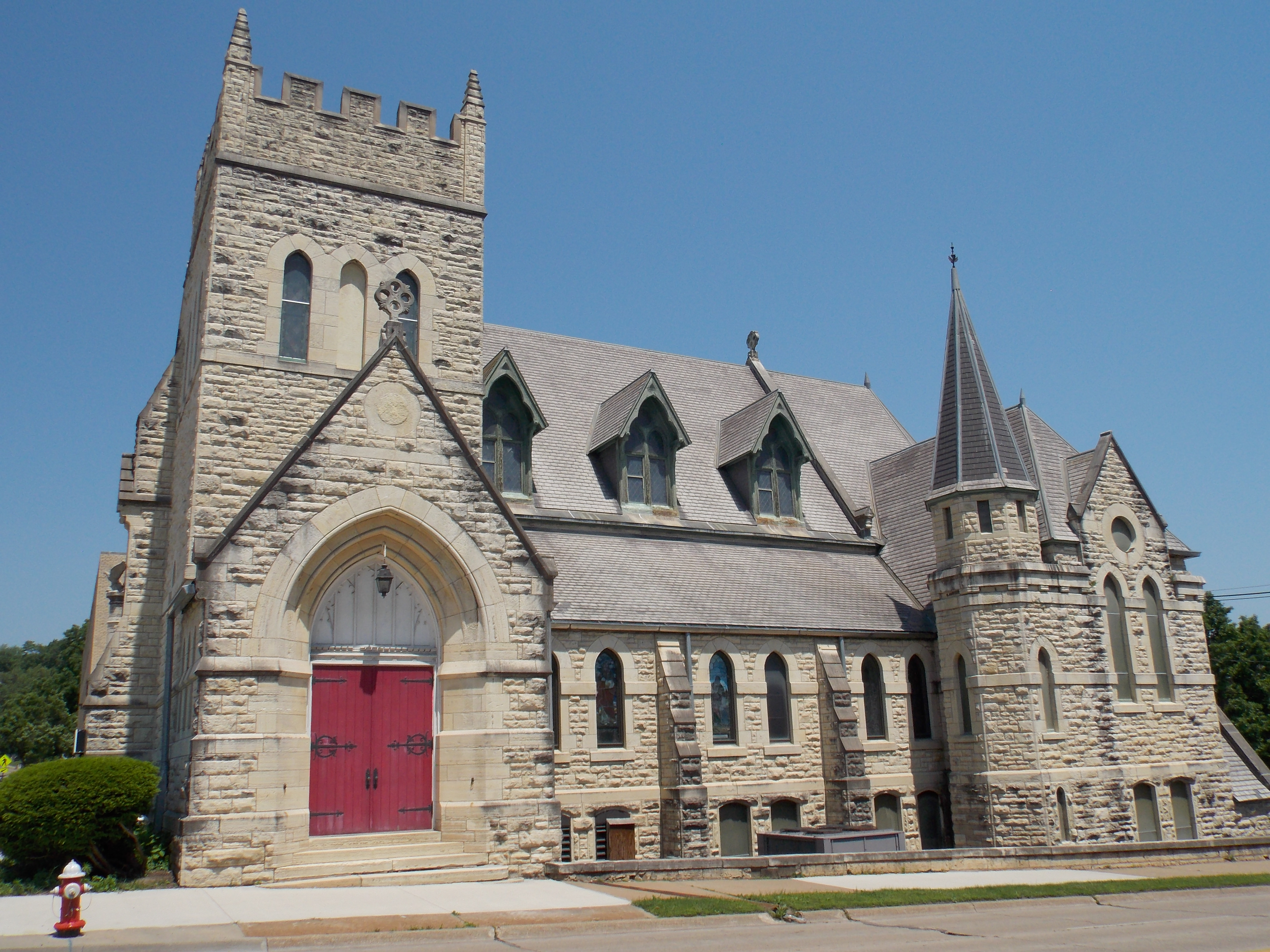
South elevation

The Rev. Henry Tullidge arrived at Grace Church in Galena, Illinois in November 1834 as a missionary supported by Grace Church in Providence, Rhode Island. The first services in Dubuque were held sometime not long after his arrival. Tullidge served the spiritual needs of people in the surrounding area. St. John's parish in Dubuque was organized in 1845 by Bishop Jackson Kemper and local residents overseeing the construction of a brick church built on the corner of Ninth and Locust Streets. The parish continued to grow, but the American Civil War delayed any plans for a new church. A parish woman's organization raised the money to buy the property on the corner of Loras and Main Streets. At the time a tenement named Norton's Rookery stood on the site.

Construction of the present church began in 1875 and it was completed three years later. The church was designed in the High Victorian Gothic style by New York architect Henry M. Congdon. The rough-cut limestone for the walls was quarried in nearby Farley, Iowa. The church follows a cross-shaped plan. It features a crenelated corner tower, recessed entryways, a rose window, roof dormers, and a shorter tower toward the back of the church that is capped by a spire. The larger tower was also designed to have an upper tower and a spire, but they were never built. Five of the stained glass windows are from Louis Comfort Tiffany's studio.
