= Robert Martin (aviator) =

Tuskegee Airman (1919–2018)

First Lieutenant Robert Leander Martin
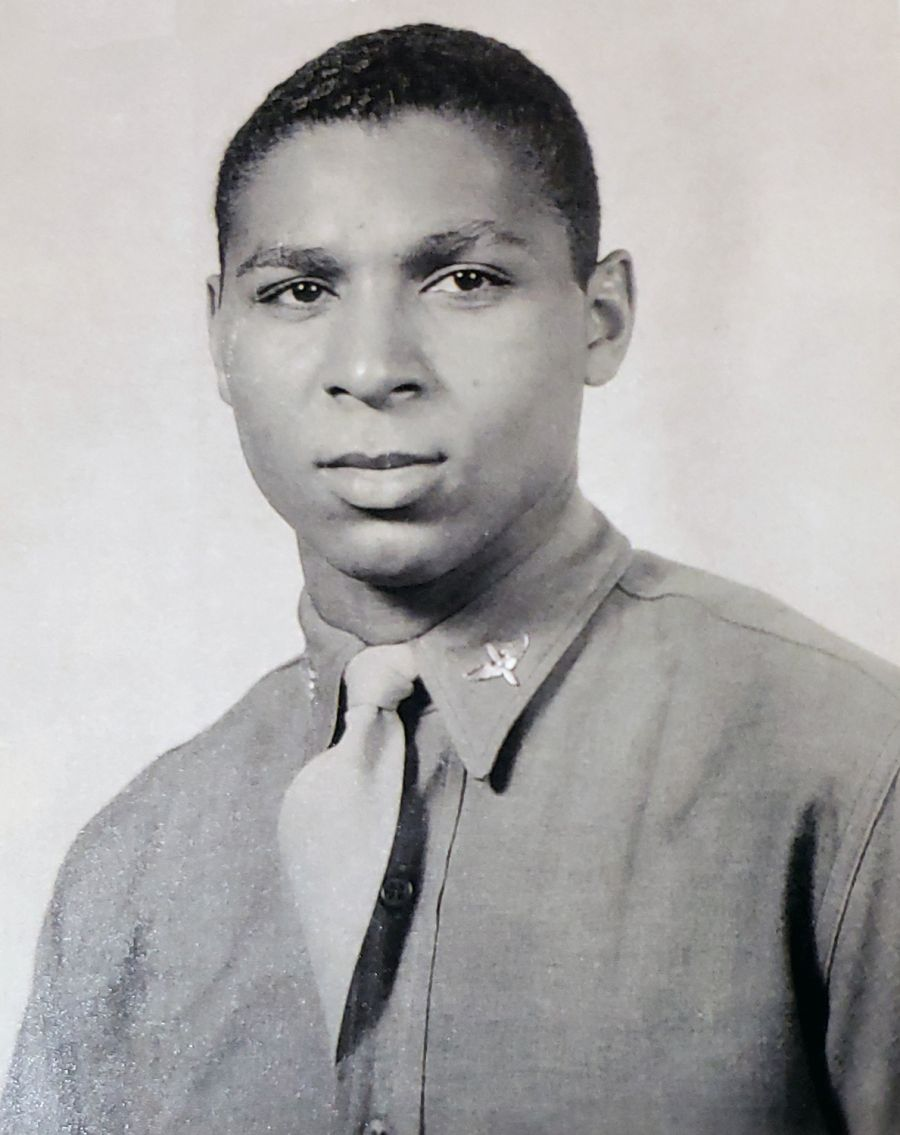
- Born: February 9, 1919; Dubuque, Iowa, U.S.
- Died: July 26, 2018 (aged 99); Olympia Fields, Illinois, U.S.
- Spouse: Odette Ewell Martin
- Military career
- Allegiance: American
- Branch: Air Force
- Rank: First Lieutenant
- Units: 100th Fighter Squadron and the 332nd Fighter Group
- Awards: Air Medal with six oak leaf clusters; Congressional Gold Medal awarded to the Tuskegee Airmen; Distinguished Flying Cross; Purple Heart

First Lieutenant Robert L. Martin (9 February 1919 – 26 July 2018) (WIA) was a Tuskegee Airman active during World War II. His aircraft was shot down after a raid on an airfield in Yugoslavia. He was a recipient of the Distinguished Flying Cross.

== Early life ==
Robert L. Martin was born in Dubuque, Iowa on 9 February 1919. His mother died shortly after his birth. His father, Henry Martin, was a chiropedis (now more widely known as a podiatrist) who moved to Dubuque prior to Robert's birth from Louisiana after visiting while working on a river boat. When he attended an air show as a 13-year-old Boy Scout, he was inspired to become a pilot. He graduated from Dubuque Senior High School, class of 1936. While still a student at Iowa State University, Martin learned to fly in a civilian pilot training program. In 1942, he graduated with a bachelor's degree in electrical engineering.

== Tuskegee ==
On 7 January 1944, at the age of 23, Martin graduated from flight training at the Tuskegee Army Air Field in Alabama. He was a member of the 100th Fighter Squadron and the 332nd Fighter Group. Martin explained that Tuskegee was "segregated where they wanted it," meaning students, ground crews, mechanics, medics and quartermasters were all black. Senior personnel instructors were all white, and acted almost like "gods." Shortly after completing his training Martin was deployed to Italy. He likes to say he flew "63 and a half" combat missions during World War II.

On 9 December 1944, Martin was returning to base from an escort mission when his P-51 Mustang suffered engine trouble. He was forced to land at a gunnery range Cuetelo, Italy. As the plane fell over the rough ground, the propeller was damaged. Martin was able to walk away from the crash landing.

In March 1945, in what would have been his 64th mission, Martin was "cut down by ground fire" after an attack mission on an enemy airfield in Zagreb, Yugoslavia. In his own words, Martin explained that seven other pilots and himself were attempting to shoot two airplanes parked a little bit off a field. They missed their target, and were blown off course by 100 mph (160 km/h). Martin felt a bump in his airplane and realized he had been hit. The engine caught on fire and Martin was forced to bail. When his parachute opened it cut him on the chin and knocked him out. Martin found shelter in a farmhouse. He was eventually rescued and taken into the headquarters of Marshal Josip Broz Tito's Partisans and hidden until he could safely return to his unit. He remained there for about five weeks.

Following the war, Martin received his military discharge at the rank of captain.

== Awards ==
- Air Medal with six oak leaf clusters
- Congressional Gold Medal awarded to the Tuskegee Airman in 2006.
- Distinguished Flying Cross
- Purple Heart

== After the war ==
In 1945, Martin returned to the U.S. after Victory in Europe Day. He looked for electrical engineering jobs but had a difficult time finding any; at the time, people weren't hiring black engineers. Martin held a variety of jobs including driving a taxi and working in factories. He was hired as a draftsman by the Chicago Park District, and went on to work as an electrical engineer for the city of Chicago. Martin retired after 37 years.

Martin was married for 68 years to the former Odette Ewell and settled in Olympia Fields, Illinois. They had four children, Gabrielle, Noelle, Dominique and Robert Martin Jr. and two grandchildren. Martin died of pneumonia on 26 July 2018, at the age of 99.

On 21 July 2020, the Dubuque Regional Airport Commission voted unanimously to name the only terminal after Captain Robert L. Martin. A fundraising campaign was underway to build a memorial monument and provide education on site about Captain Robert Martin and Tuskegee Airmen. Ribbon cutting unveiling of the Captain Robert L. Martin occurred on Tuesday, July 19, 2022.

In 2024, a biography that Martin was working on with author Karen Patterson prior to his death was published. It is titled Red Tail: A Tuskegee Airman’s Rendezvous with Destiny.

== See also ==
- Dogfights (TV series)
- Executive Order 9981
- Fly (2009 play about the 332d Fighter Group)
- Freeman Field Mutiny
- List of Tuskegee Airmen
- Military history of African Americans
- The Tuskegee Airmen (movie)
