= Dale Threlkeld =

American artist

Dale Threlkeld is an artist who has exhibited his oil paintings in galleries in New York City as well as competitions throughout the United States.

== Career ==
A solo exhibition of his paintings was featured at the Krasl Art Center in Michigan April 11 – May 18, 2008. His paintings were included in "The New Expressionists" at the Dubuque Museum of Art in 2002, and an invitational at the Mitchell Museum of Art, Mt. Vernon, Illinois in 2003. Paintings and drawings by the artist are represented in numerous collections including the Brooklyn Museum of Art, The Illinois State Museum, The Atlantic Richfield Collection, the State of Illinois Collections and The Mitchell Museum of Art. He participated in The Artist's Project, Art Chicago 2008 and Pool Art Fair, New York City in March 2010. The purchase of his work "Birth to Light" is now installed in the Hatheway Cultural Center Art Gallery at Lewis and Clark College. In 2016, a painting by Threlkeld was on the cover of ArtCover Magazine, Issue 1 as well as a feature in Issue 2 of the magazine.

== Collections ==
- Brooklyn Museum of Art, Brooklyn, NY
- Illinois State Museum, Springfield, IL
- Northern Illinois University, DeKalb, IL
- Arkansas Art Center, Little Rock, AR
- Atlantic Richfield Collection, Los Angeles, CA
- Dulin Gallery of Art, Knoxville, TN
- The Schmidt Art Center, (Belleville, IL)
- Mitchel Museum, Mount Vernon, IL
- Nation's Bank Collection, Illinois State Art Collection CDB,
- Northern Illinois University, Dekalb, IL
- Southern Illinois University, Edwardsville, IL
- Truman University, Kirksville, MO
- Wabash College, Wabash, IN
- The Schmidt Art Center, Belleville, IL

== Exhibitions ==
End of Illusions, Traveling Art Exhibition,
Sordoni Art Museum, Wilkes-Barre, PA, 2015

End of Illusions, Traveling Art Exhibition,
Castellani Art Museum, Niagara University, Buffalo, NY, 2014

Eye to Eye: Color and Form with Michael Dunbar,
The Schmidt Art Center, Belleville, IL, 2014

Birth to Light Exhibition,
Hatheway Cultural Center Art Gallery, Lewis and Clark College, 2012

Eye to Eye: Color and Form with Michael Dunbar,
Evan Lurie Gallery, Carmel, IN, 2012

The New Expressionists,
Dubuque Museum of Art Dubuque, IA 2002

One Person Painting Exhibition,
The Schmidt Art Center Belleville, IL 2002

Painting Exhibition, CedarHurst Gallery
Mitchel Museum of Art Mt. Vernon, IL 2001

One Person Exhibition,
Contemporary Art Center Peoria, IL 1996

Metropolitan St. Louis Figure Exhibition,
Southern Illinois University 1984

Fine Artists Invitational Exhibition
Evanston Art Center Evanston, IL 1982

Three Artists
Evanston Art Center Evanston, IL 1980

New Talent Exhibition, Gimple and Weizenhofer
New York, NY 1978

Midstates Traveling Arts Exhibition
Evansville Museum of Art 1974

9th Annual Prints and Drawing Exhibition,
The Dulin Gallery of Art Knoxville TN 1976
[purchase award]

Unique Works on Paper,
Van Straaten Gallery Chicago, IL 1975

6th Annual Prints and Drawings Exhibition,
The Arkansas Art Center 1976

8th Annual Mid-south Exhibition,
Brooks Memorial Gallery Memphis TN 1975

5th Annual Prints and Drawings Exhibition,
The Arkansas Art Center 1975
