= Lock and Dam No. 11 =

Dam in Iowa and Wisconsin, U.S.

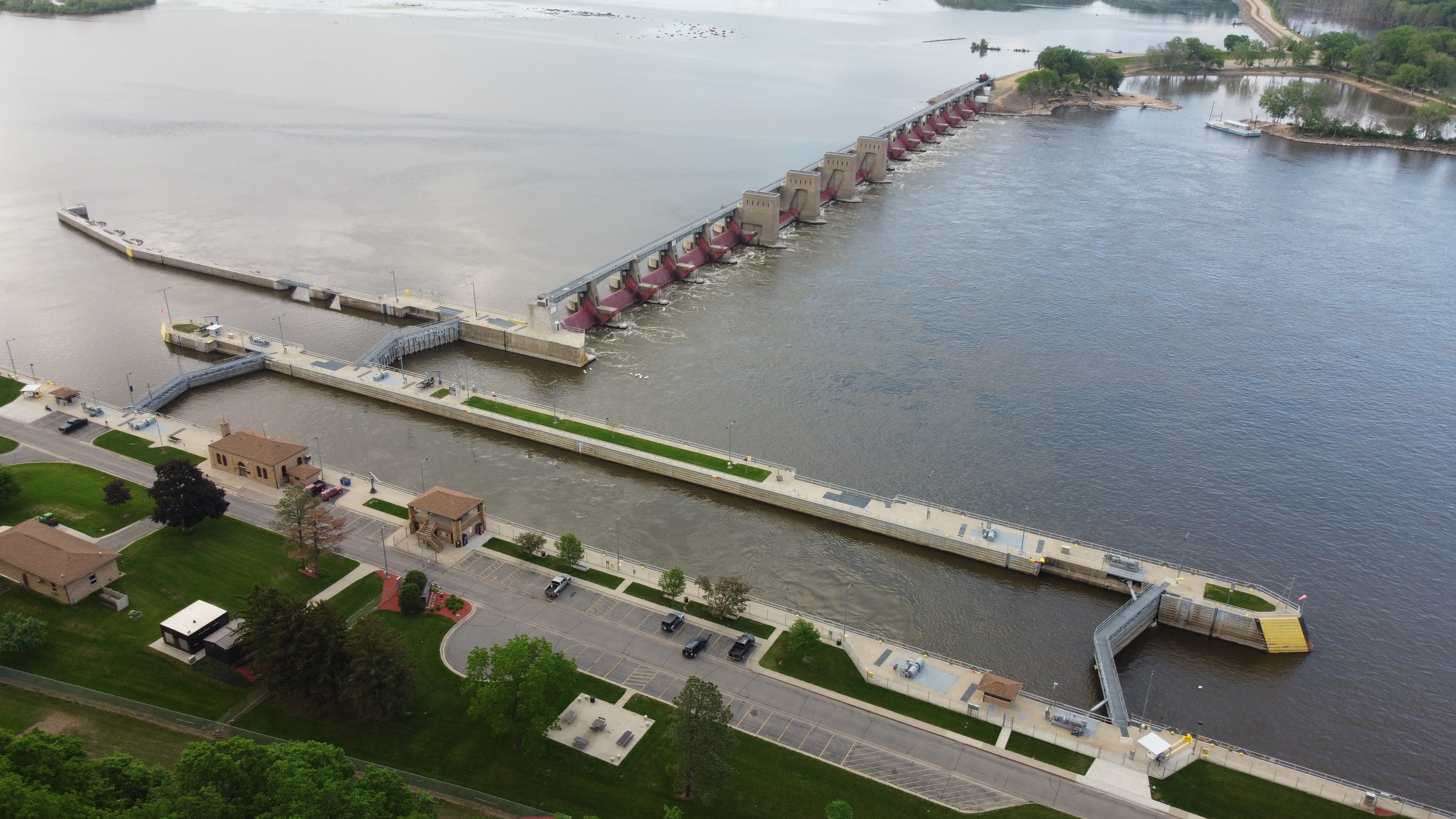
- Lock and Dam No. 11 as seen from a drone.
- Interactive map of Lock and Dam No. 11
- Official name: General Zebulon Pike Lock and Dam No. 11
- Location: Dubuque, Iowa / Jamestown, Grant County, Wisconsin
- Coordinates: 42°32′25″N 90°38′39″W
- Construction began: 1934
- Opening date: 14 September 1937
- Operators: U.S. Army Corps of Engineers, Rock Island District

Dam and spillways
- Impounds: Upper Mississippi River
- Length: 1,478 ft (450 m)

Reservoir
- Creates: Pool 11
- Total capacity: 170,000 acre⋅ft (0.21 km^{3})
- Catchment area: 81,600 mi^{2} (211,000 km^{2})
- Lock and Dam No. 11 Historic District
- U.S. National Register of Historic Places
- U.S. Historic district
- Location within Iowa Location within the United States
- Location: 11 Lime Street, Dubuque, Iowa
- Area: 114.2 acres (46.22 ha)
- Built: 1937
- Architect: Abbott, Edwin E.; multiple
- Architectural style: lock and dam
- MPS: Upper Mississippi River 9-Foot Navigation Project MPS
- NRHP reference No.: 04000171
- Added to NRHP: March 10, 2004

General Zebulon Pike Lock and Dam No. 11 is a lock and dam located between Dubuque, Iowa, and rural Grant County, Wisconsin, on the Upper Mississippi River.

It was opened to navigation September 14, 1937.

== Description ==
The movable portion of the dam is 1,478 feet (450.5 m) long and consists of 13 tainter gates and three roller gates. The non-movable part is a 3,340 feet (1,018.0 m) long non-overflow earthen dam that connects to the Wisconsin shore.

The main lock is 110 feet (33.5 m) wide by 600 feet (182.9 m) long. There is also an incomplete auxiliary lock.

The lock and dam are listed on the National Register of Historic Places.

== History ==
Construction the lock began in February 1934 while the dam was started to be built September 1935. They were completed August 1936 and May 1937 respectively. The system was put into operation on September 14, 1937.

In December 2015, 200 coots died near the dam and O'Leary Lake. In March 2018, several barges got loose and hit the dam.

== Gallery ==
Lock and Dam No. 11

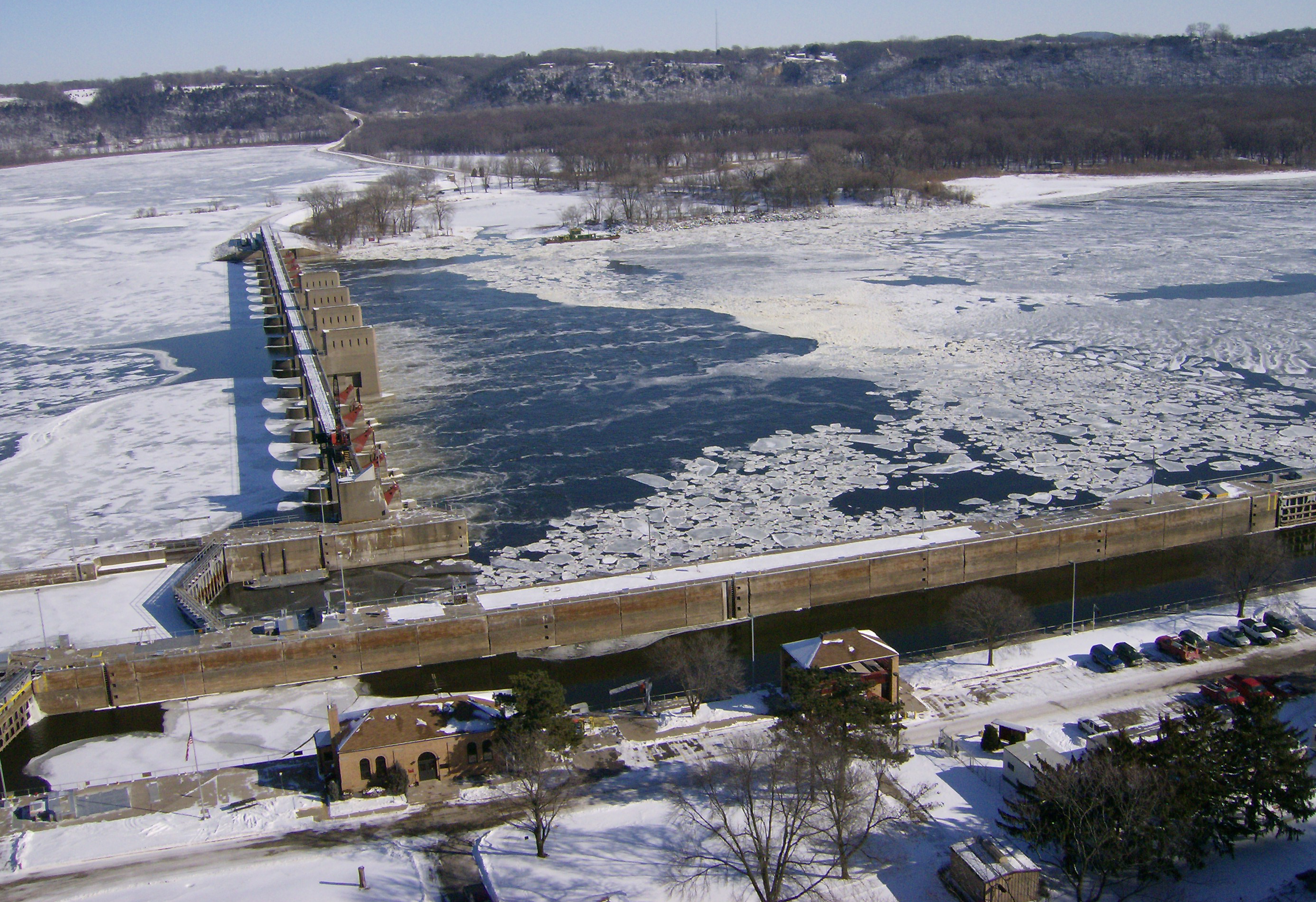

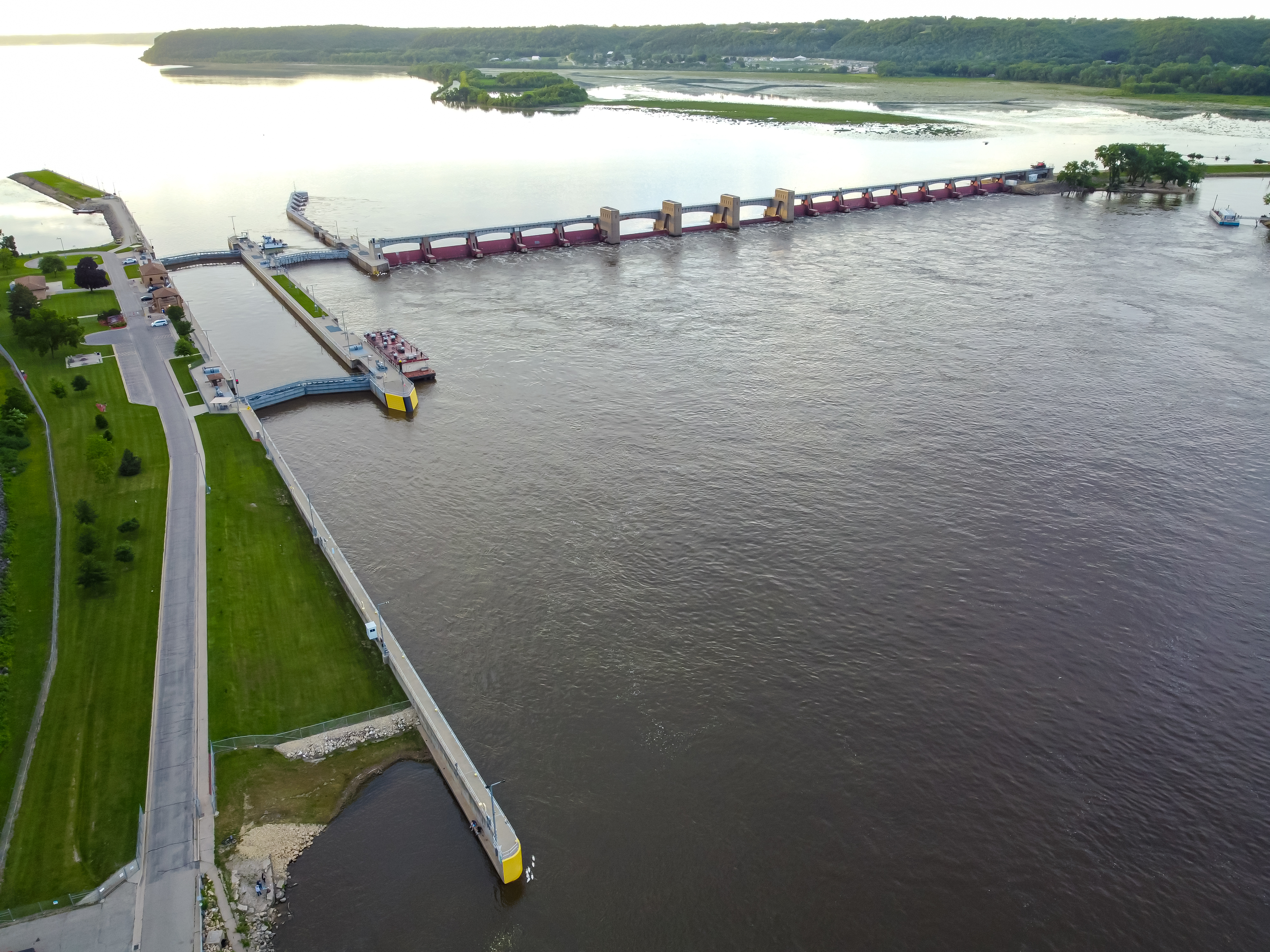

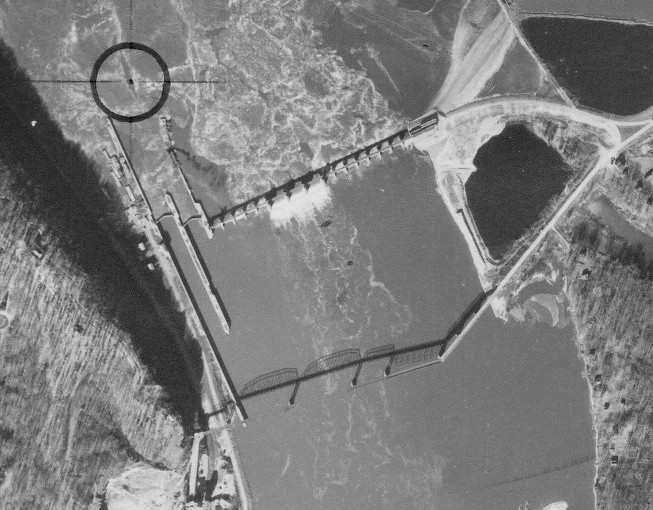
Aerial view, with Eagle Point Bridge (1940)

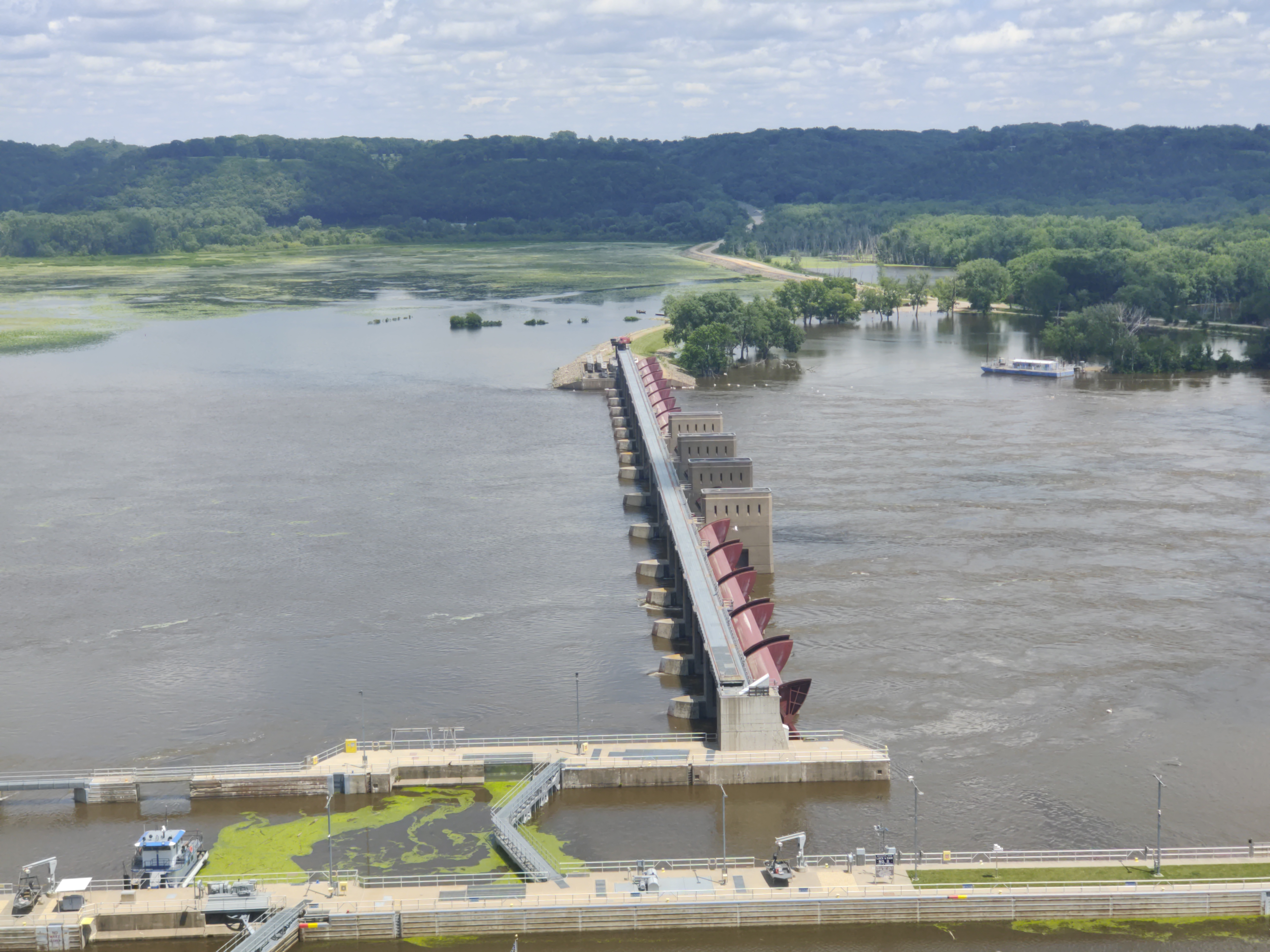
View from atop nearby Eagle Point Park.

https://web.archive.org/web/20161226221158/http://www.mvr.usace.army.mil/Portals/48/docs/CC/FactSheets/MISS/UMR%20Locks%20%26%20Dams%20-%202016%20%28MVD%29.pdf

== See also ==
- Mississippi River locks
- Upper Mississippi River National Wildlife and Fish Refuge
- Eagle Point Bridge
- Sinnipee, Wisconsin
- Public Works Administration dams dist
