= O'Leary Lake =

Lake in Grant County, Wisconsin

Coordinates: 42.54°N 90.635°W

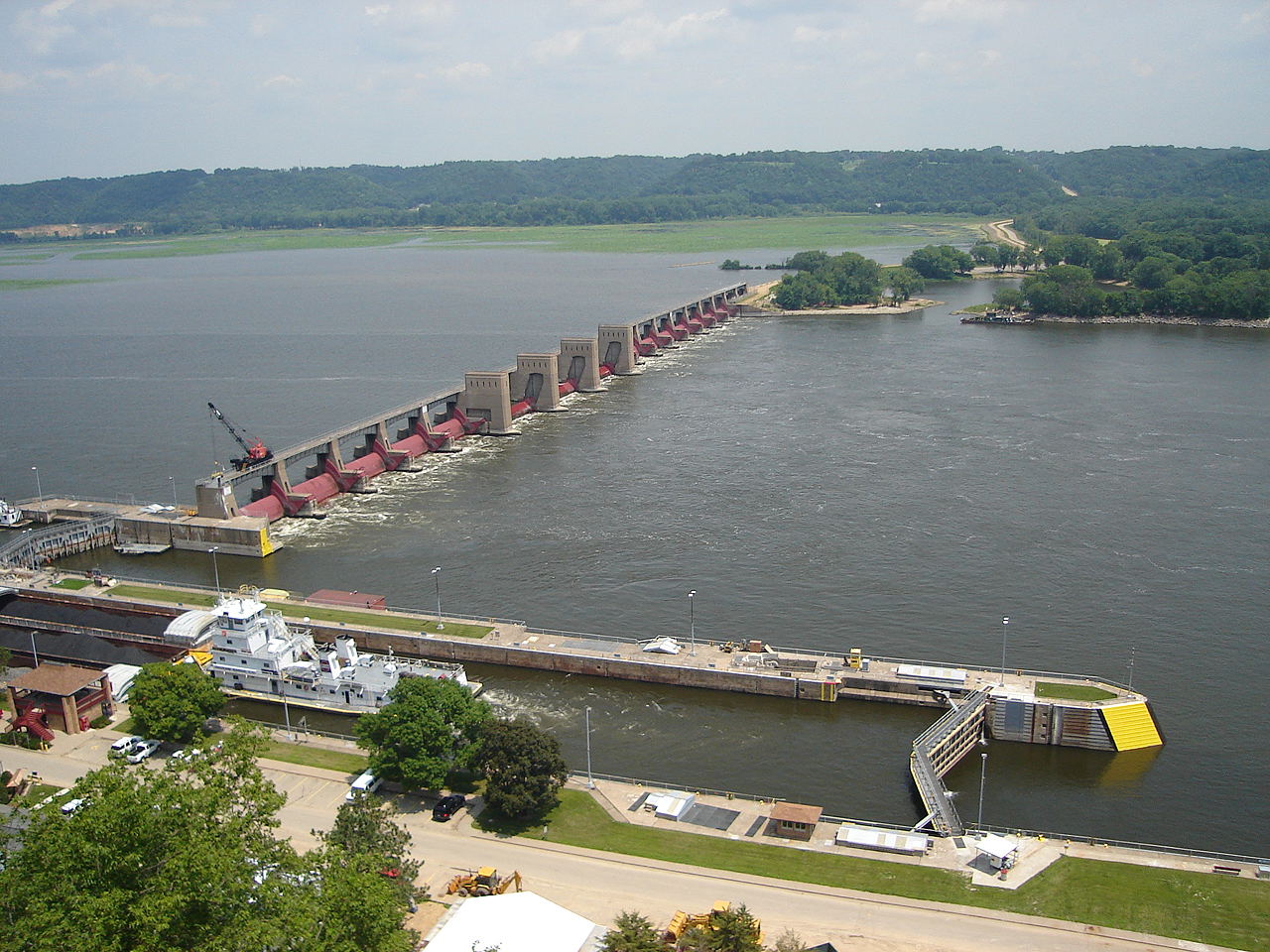
- An image of the Mississippi River with O'Leary Lake in the upper right of the image.
- Interactive map of O'Leary Lake
- Part of: Mississippi River
- Basin countries: United States
- Surface area: 7 acres (2.8 ha)
- Max. depth: 14 feet (4.3 m)

O'Leary Lake is a lake near the Mississippi River in Grant County, Wisconsin. It is a popular fishing spot for the Dubuque Metropolitan Area. The lake contains panfish, largemouth bass, and smallmouth bass.

== History ==
In 2015, 200 coots died near O'Leary Lake and Lock and Dam No. 11.

== Geography ==
O'Leary Lake has an area of 7 acres (2.8 ha). It is 14 feet (4.3 m) deep. The lake is located near Lock and Dam No. 11.
