= Dubuque Intermodal Transportation Center =

Intermodel passenger station in Dubuque, Iowa

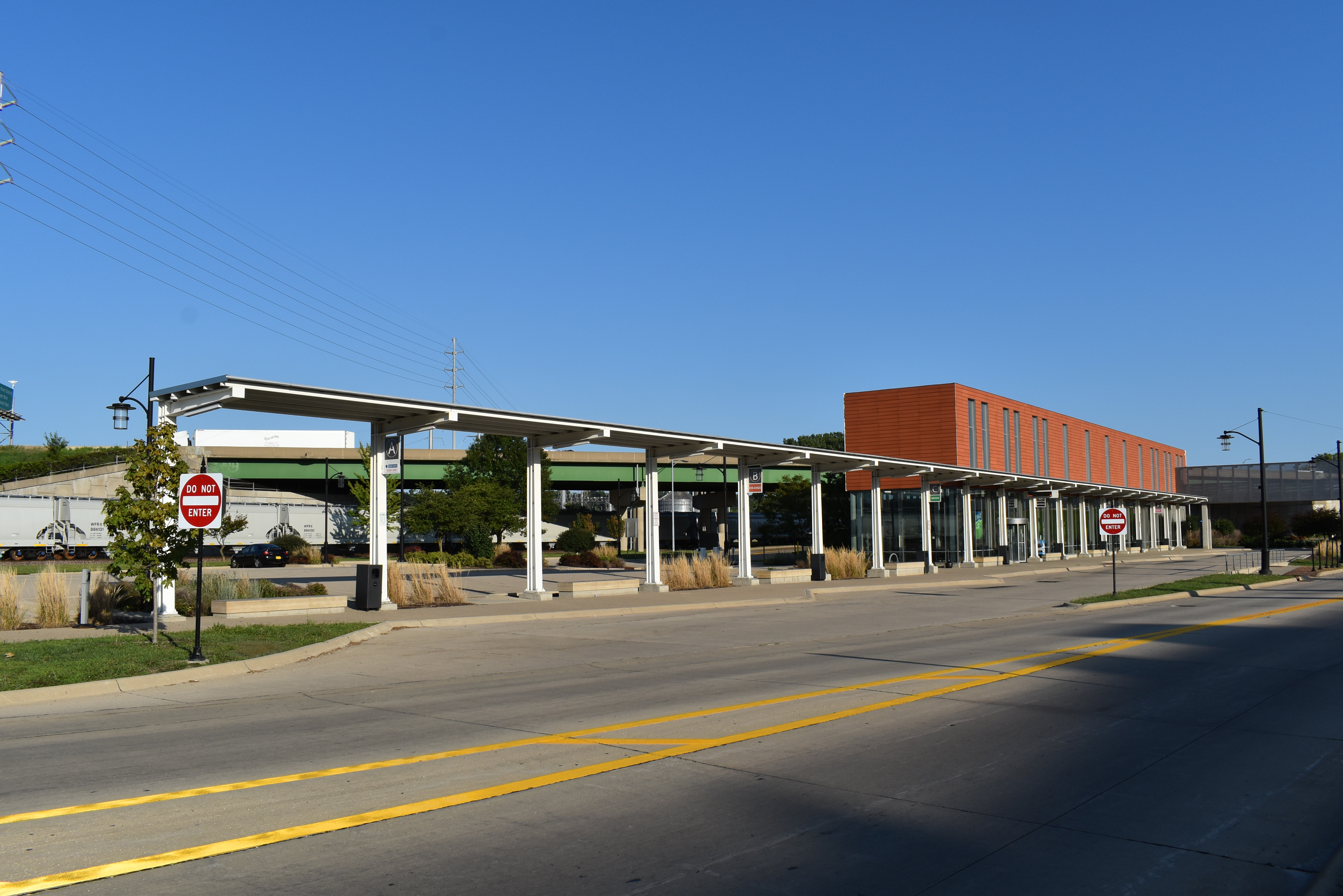
- The Dubuque Intermodal Transportation Center in 2021

General information
- Location: 950 Elm Street; Dubuque, Iowa
- Coordinates: 42°30′20″N 90°39′44″W
- Owner: City of Dubuque
- Line: Canadian National Railway

Construction
- Parking: Yes
- Cycle facilities: Yes
- Accessible: Yes

History
- Opened: August 17, 2015
Location

The Dubuque Intermodal Transportation Center (DITC) is a transit facility in Dubuque, Iowa. It functions as the central transfer point for Dubuque's local bus system and serves as the city's primary intercity bus station. The site also includes facilities intended for future passenger rail services. The center opened in 2015 and is located near downtown Dubuque.

== History ==
The center was originally planned as the western terminal of the Black Hawk, a proposed Amtrak route from Chicago through Rockford to Dubuque. The city received an $8 million FTA State of Good Repair grant and additional local funding for phase 1 of construction. A TIGER V application for phase 2 was not approved, and the city identified other sources to continue the project. In 2014, Illinois announced that Amtrak service would end in Rockford after it was unable to reach an agreement with the Canadian National Railway on track access. Rail portions of the project where placed on hold while negotiations with the railroad continued. The city continued with the proposal after earlier complications and began construction in May 2014.
