= Frentress Lake =

Lake in Illinois, United States

- Location within Illinois Location within the United States
- Location: Jo Daviess County
- Coordinates: 42°27′48″N 90°36′39″W
- Primary inflows: Mississippi River
- Primary outflows: Mississippi River
- Basin countries: United States
- Max. length: 1.5 mi (2.4 km)
- Max. width: 0.25 mi (0.40 km)
- Surface area: 160 acres (65 ha)
- Average depth: 5–20 ft (1.5–6.1 m)
- Max. depth: 46 ft (14 m)
- Surface elevation: 591 ft (180 m)

Frentress Lake is a backwater lake located on the eastern side of the Mississippi River in Jo Daviess County in northern Illinois, to the southeast of East Dubuque.

== History ==
Homes on Frentress Lake experienced flooding in April 2011.

In 2017, a plane crashed near the marina in Frentress Lake.

In 2025, work began on U.S. Route 20 which made access to Frentress Lake easier.
