= The Jule =

Mass transit operator in Dubuque, Iowa

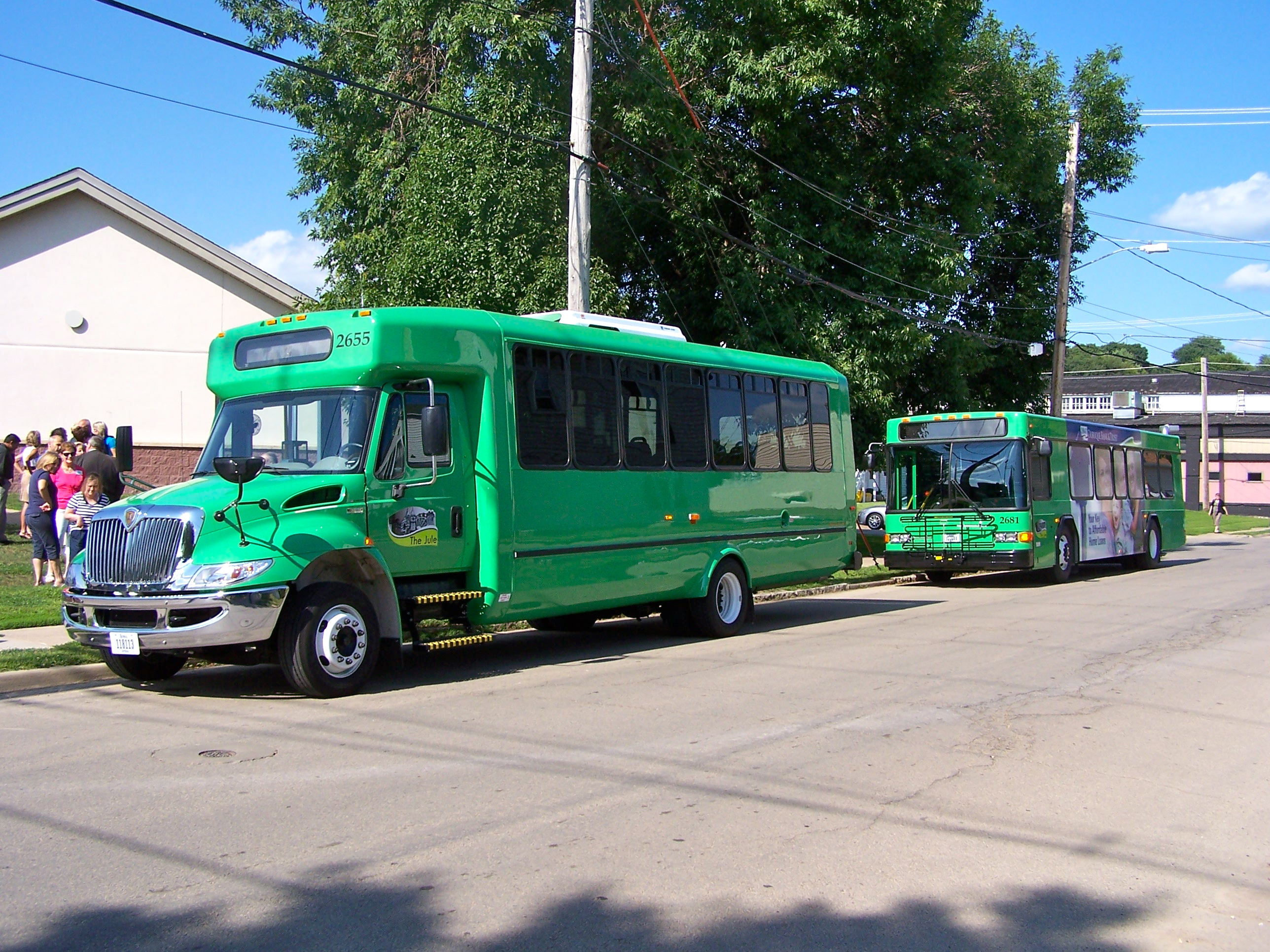
- Parent: City of Dubuque
- Headquarters: 950 Elm St.
- Locale: Dubuque, Iowa
- Service area: Dubuque County
- Service type: Bus service, Paratransit
- Alliance: Delaware, Dubuque, & Jackson County Regional Transit Authority
- Routes: 9
- Hubs: 3 (Dubuque Intermodal Transportation Center & 2 transfer points)
- Fleet: 32
- Daily ridership: 390,427 (2024)
- Fuel type: Clean diesel
- Director: Ryan Knuckey
- Website: Official Site

The Jule, formerly KeyLine Transit, is a public transit operator in Dubuque, Iowa. The system's name is derived from Julien Dubuque, the city's namesake. The Dubuque Intermodal Transportation Center, which opened in 2015, serves as the primary transfer facility for local and intercity bus travel.

Since 2020, the network has been adjusted several times to respond to shifting travel patterns following the COVID-19 pandemic. These changes have reflected the long-term shifts in travel demand and commuting patterns.

== History ==
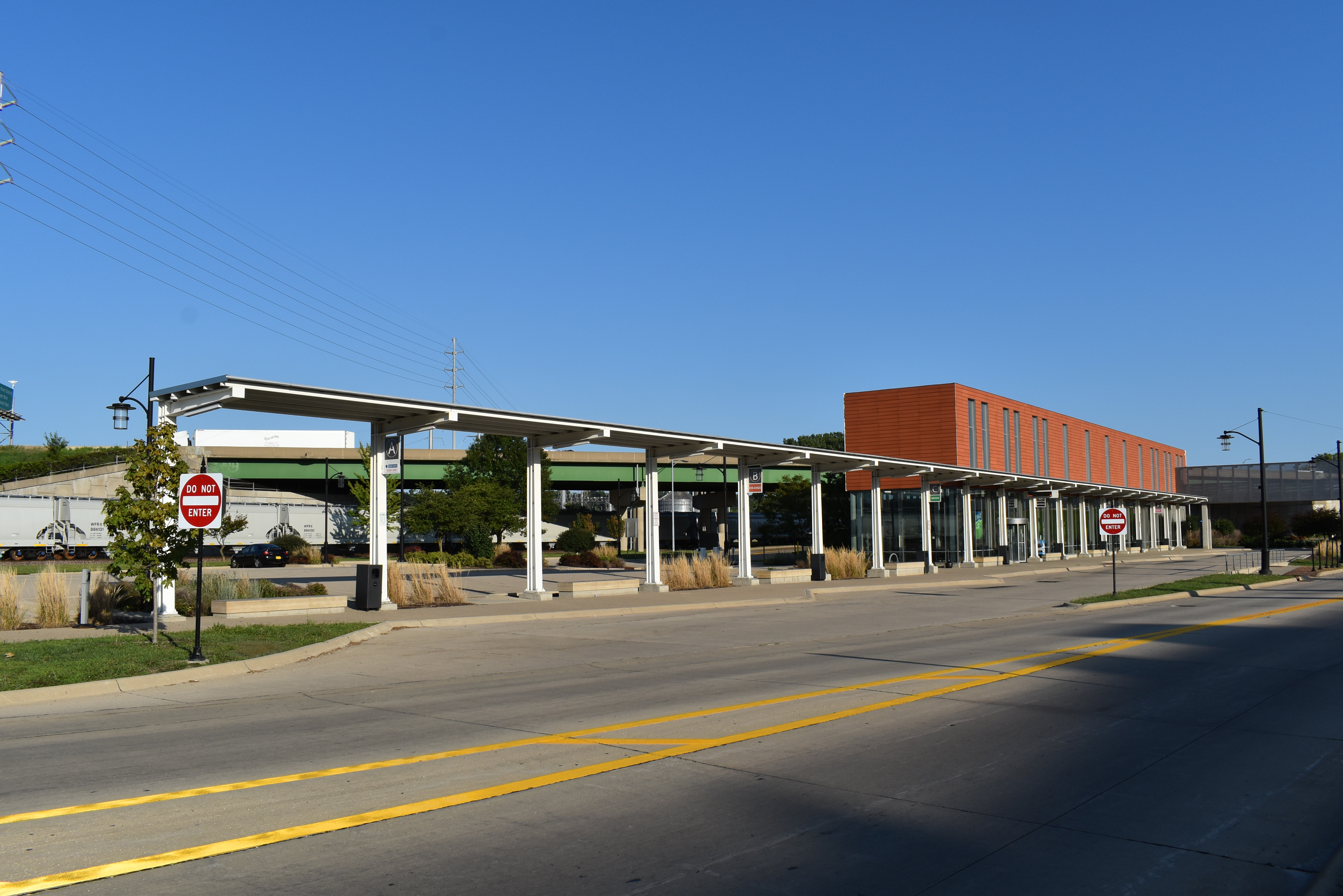
Dubuque Intermodal Transportation Center

Public transit in Dubuque was consolidated in the early 1970s, when the city assumed control of the Interstate Power and Light Company's bus operations. Under city ownership, the system was renamed KeyLine and used a decentralized transfer model centered on the intersection of Ninth and Main Streets in the downtown core.

In 2011, the system adopted the name The Jule as part of a broader effort to improve marketability and support downtown revitalization. The network fully completed the rebranding in 2015, coinciding with the opening of the centralized Dubuque Intermodal Transportation Center. The name is a reference to city founder Julien Dubuque. In 2018, The Jule's fleet operations and training center moved to a new $6.2 million facility in Dubuque.

Similar to many other transit systems, ridership declined sharply during the early stages of COVID‑19, prompting temporary service reductions. The city conducted a systemwide study to improve efficiency and better serve major destinations. Initial changes were implemented in 2022, with further refinements in 2023. Fleet modernization has been a parallel priority. State and federal funding supported the replacement of aging buses with hybrid and electric vehicles, along with upgrades to passenger information and fare systems.

== Services ==
A network redesign beginning in 2021 simplified routes and aimed to make travel more intuitive. Most routes operate to or from JFK Circle or the Intermodal Transportation Center. JFK Circle functions as the secondary transfer point focused on allowing access between routes on the city's west side. Seasonal trolley service operates during the summer, connecting the Mississippi River riverfront and historic districts. The city also offers fare-free services to local colleges during the academic year. The program is partially funded and coordinated with the University of Dubuque, Loras College, and Clarke University. Saturday service operates on a reduced schedule, with several weekday routes consolidated into combined all-day patterns. There is no service on Sundays or evenings.

=== Weekday fixed routes ===
Route	Service area
Blue	Downtown and near south side
Brown	JFK Circle and northwest side
Express	Limited stop service between the Intermodal Center and JFK Circle
Green	Downtown and northern neighborhoods
Grey	JFK Circle and near west side areas
Orange	Downtown, universities, and far southern neighborhoods
Pink	Downtown and north end areas
Purple	Southwest side retail circulator via JFK Circle

=== Peak hour service ===
The Jule operates several commuter services during peak periods mainly using deviations or extensions of existing routes, providing timed connections to major employment centers.

=== Paratransit ===
Paratransit service is offered through The Jule's on-demand program, providing curb-to-curb transportation for eligible riders.

== Fleet ==
In 2011, The Jule renewed its fleet with new vehicles for fixed route and paratransit service, including buses from Gillig and ElDorado National, paratransit vehicles based on the Mercedes-Benz Sprinter, and seasonal tourist trolley buses aimed at visitors. As of 2023, its year-round fixed-route fleet consisted of 18 Gillig Low Floor buses.

Fleet number(s)	Photo	Year	Manufacturer	Model	Notes
2500-2504		2022	Gillig	Low Floor 29'	
2680-2683		2011	Gillig	Low Floor 35'	
2690-2691		2002	Gillig	Low Floor 35'	Originally Park City Transit buses, purchased in 2017.; Contingency fleet.
2692-2694		2003	Gillig	Low Floor 29'	Originally Butler County Regional Transit Authority buses, purchased in 2017.
2695-2698		2020	Gillig	Low Floor 29'	

== Fixed route ridership ==
The ridership and service statistics shown here are of fixed route services only and do not include demand response. Per capita statistics are based on the Dubuque urbanized area as reported in NTD data.

Year	Ridership	Change over previous year
2014	409,144	▲8.38%
2015	479,185	▲17.12%
2016	486,691	▲1.57%
2017	455,959	▼6.31%
2018	445,817	▼2.22%
2019	421,693	▼5.41%
2020	333,244	▼20.97%
2021	319,697	▼4.07%
2022	333,187	▲4.13%
2023	331,709	▼4.44%
2024	390,427	▲17.71%

== Gallery ==
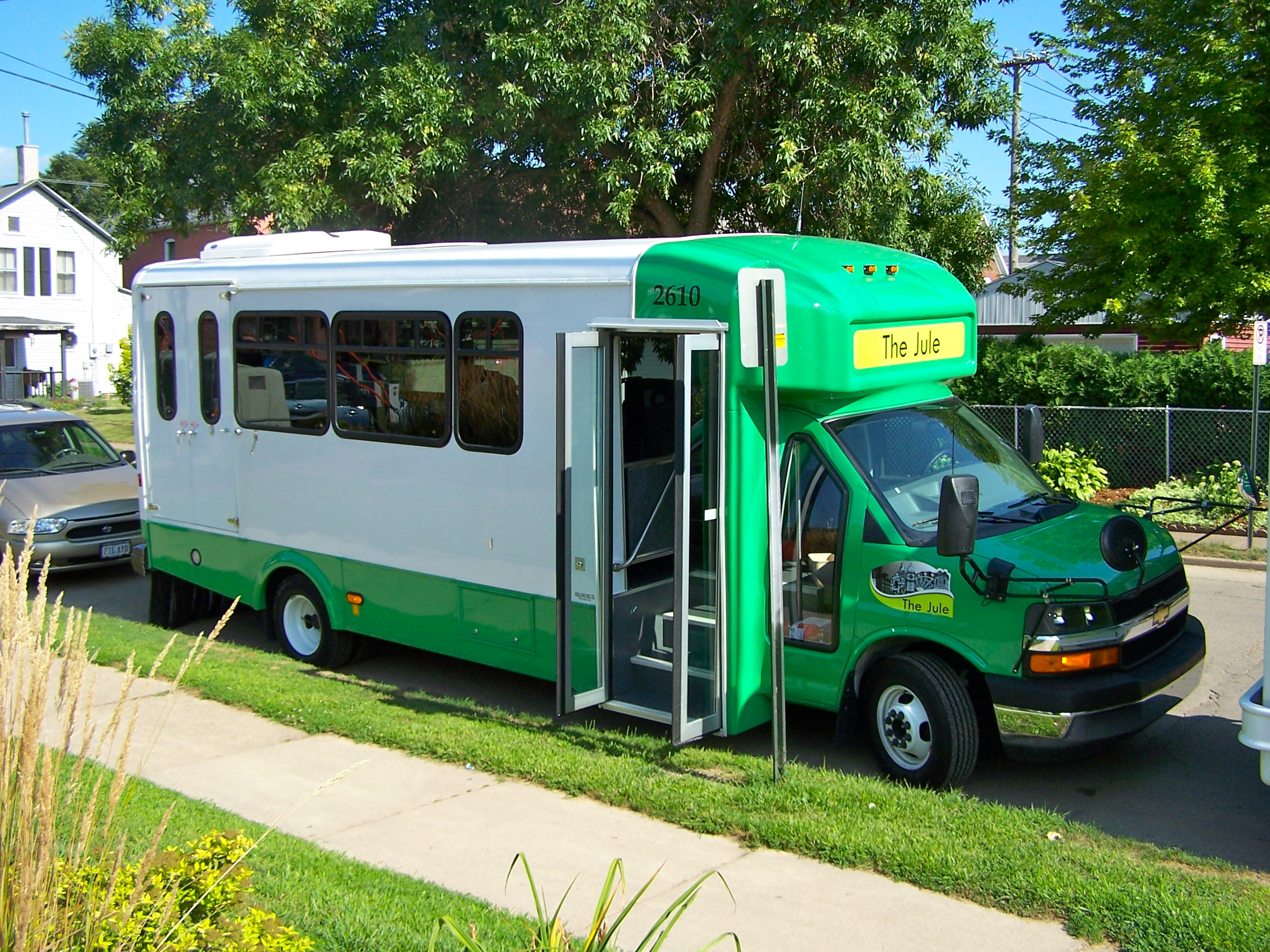
GMC safari light duty bus

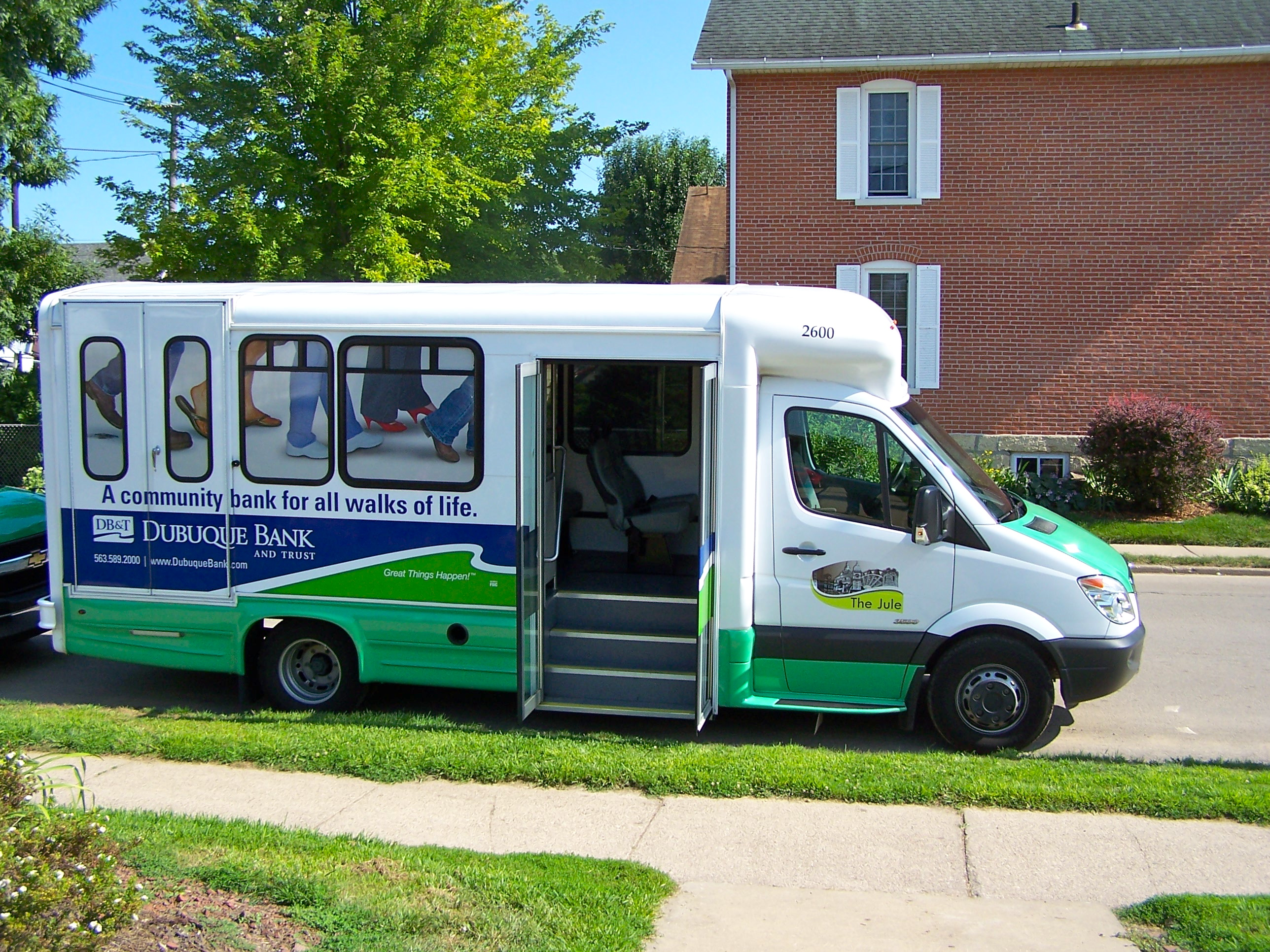
Sprinter mini-bus

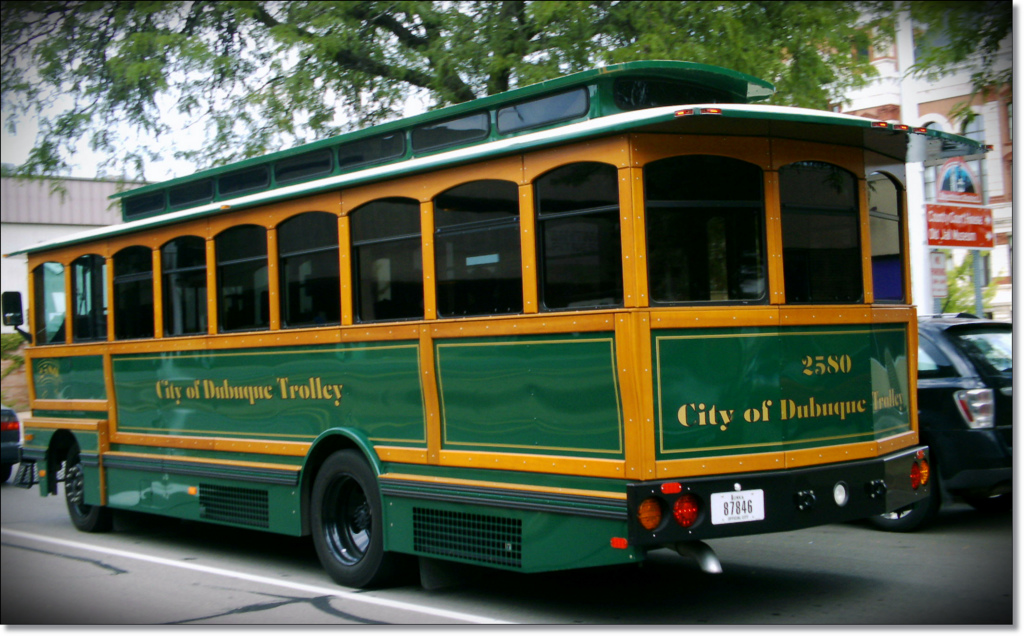
Trolley bus

== See also ==
- MET Transit
- Scenic Mississippi Regional Transit
- Cedar Rapids Transit
- Platteville Public Transportation
