= Saints Peter and Paul Church (Petersburg, Iowa) =

- U.S. National Register of Historic Places
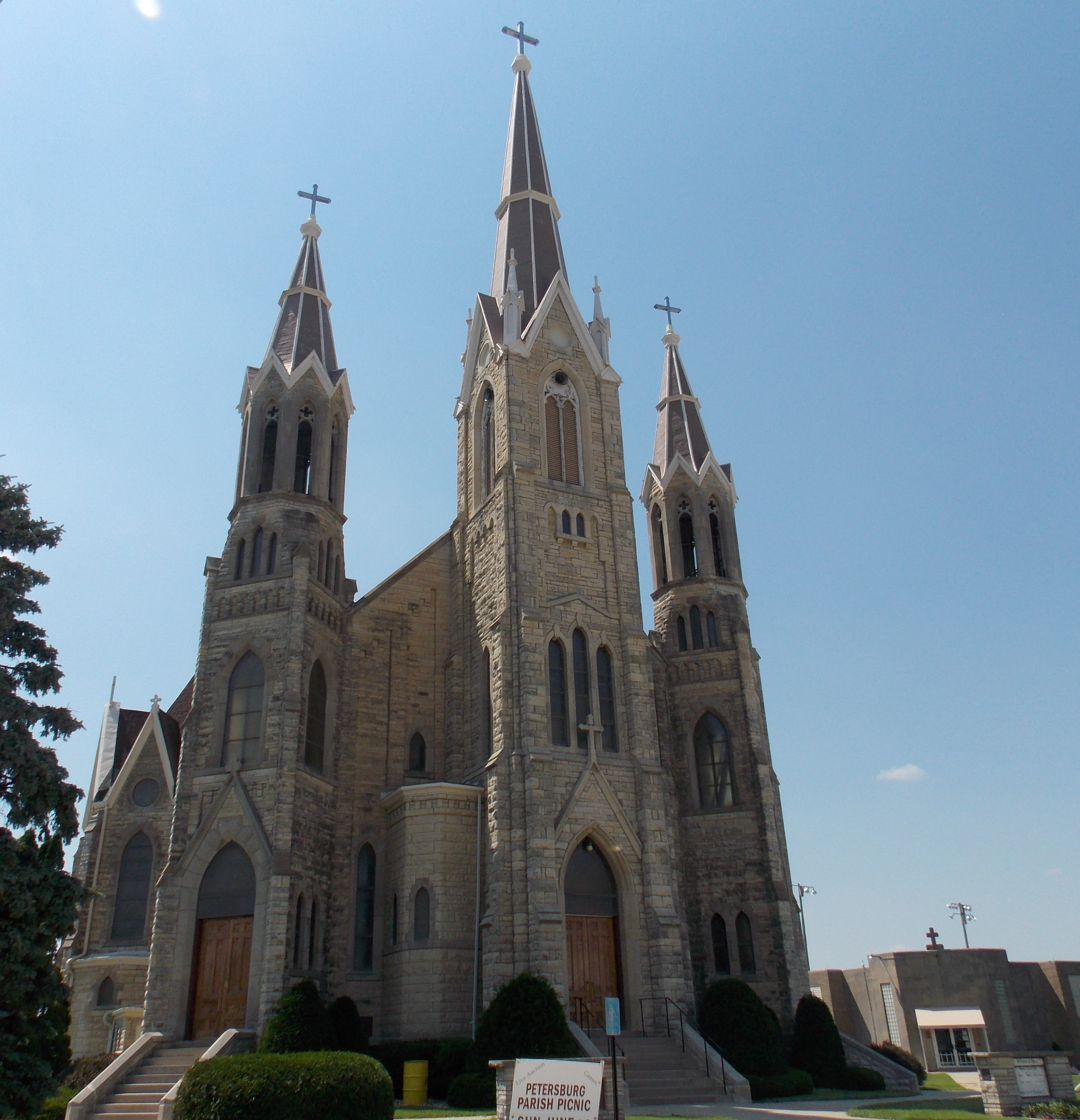

- Location within Iowa Location within the United States
- Location: Jct. of C64 and X47; Petersburg, Iowa
- Coordinates: 42°33′18″N 91°12′51″W
- Area: 2 acres (0.81 ha)
- Built: 1906
- Architect: Martin Heer
- Architectural style: Late Gothic Revival
- NRHP reference No.: 94001589
- Added to NRHP: January 24, 1995

Saints Peter and Paul Catholic Church is a parish church in the Archdiocese of Dubuque. The church is located in the unincorporated community of Petersburg, Iowa, United States. It was listed on the National Register of Historic Places in 1995.

== History ==
The first church building for Saints Peter and Paul parish was constructed of limestone in 1868. The present church was completed in 1906. It was constructed in cut-stone, quarried in Stone City, Iowa, in the Late Gothic Revival style. It was designed by Dubuque architect Martin Heer. The church was commissioned during the pastorate of the Rev. William B. Sassen in 1903. The foundation was laid by M.J. Mersch, and Dubuque contractor F.D. Schnak was responsible for the superstructure. The altars and the confessionals were created by the Hackner Altar Company of La Crosse, Wisconsin. The interior frescos were the work of Joseph Walters of Dubuque. The stained glass windows were designed and manufactured under the direction of Victor von der Frost in Munster, Germany. The church was completed for $85,000. The pipe organ in the rear gallery was built by the Tellers Organ Company of Erie, Pennsylvania, in 1939. In addition to the church, the rectory (1917) and an Art Deco school building are located on the parish grounds.

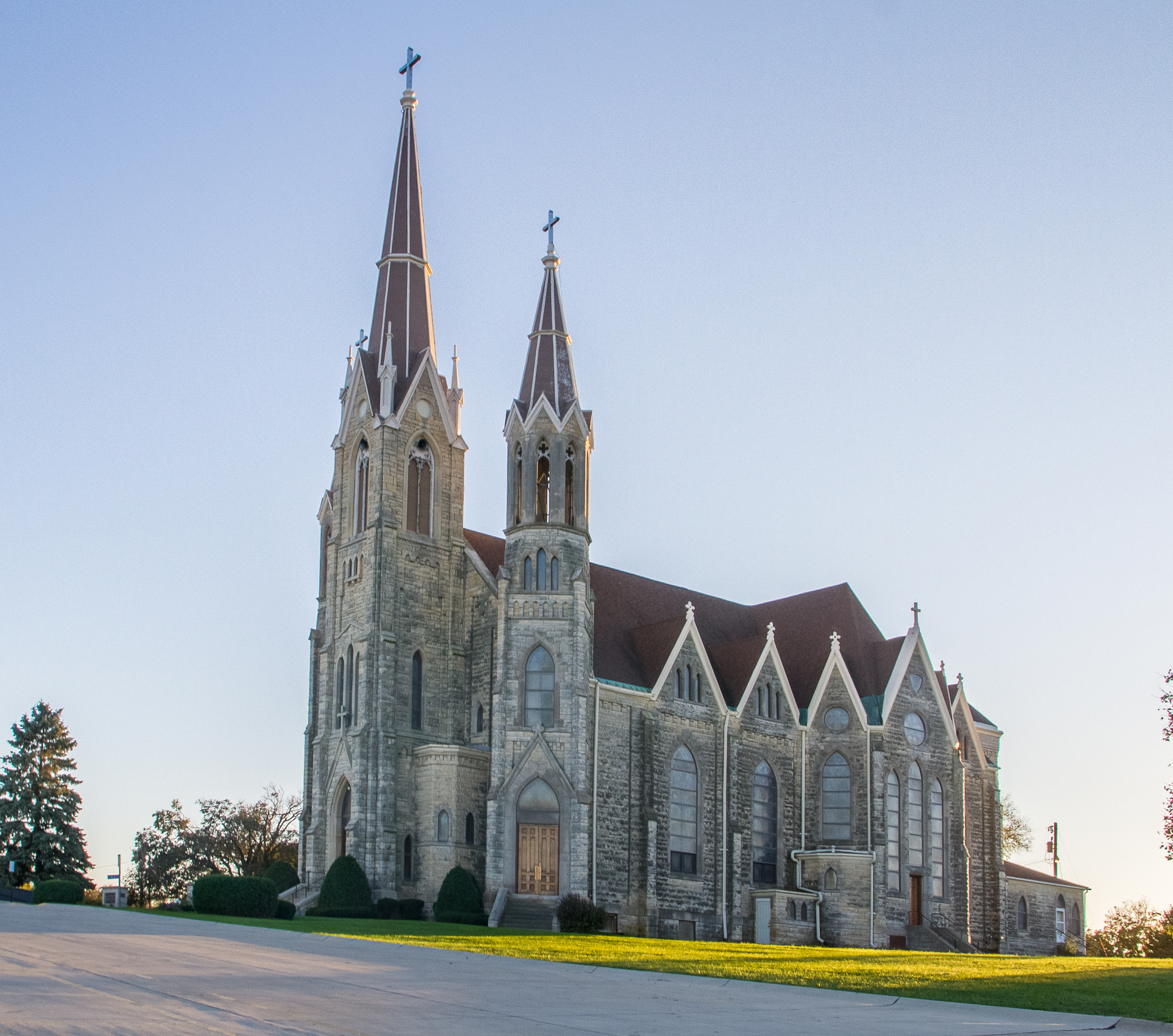
From the north

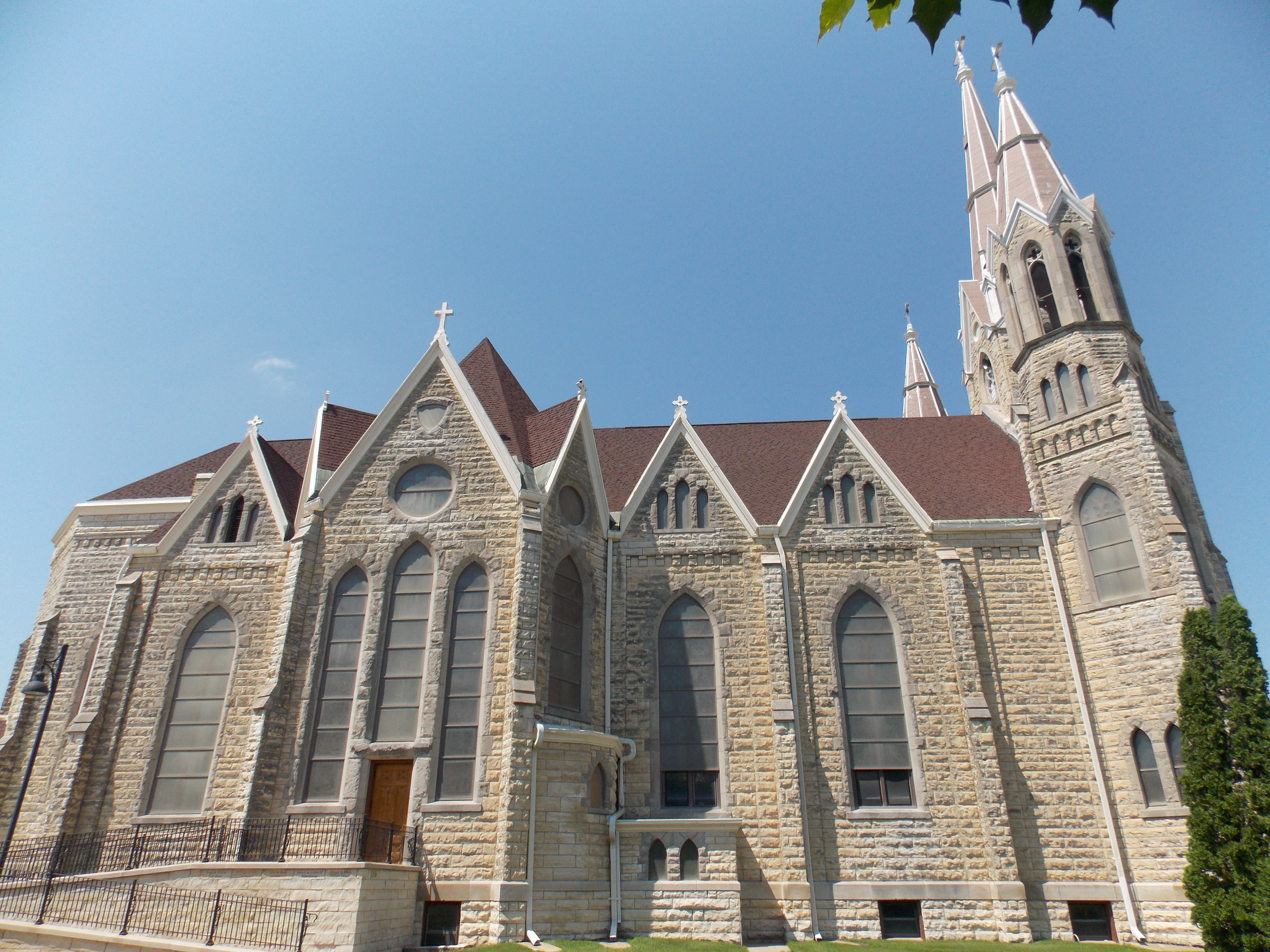
Side elevation

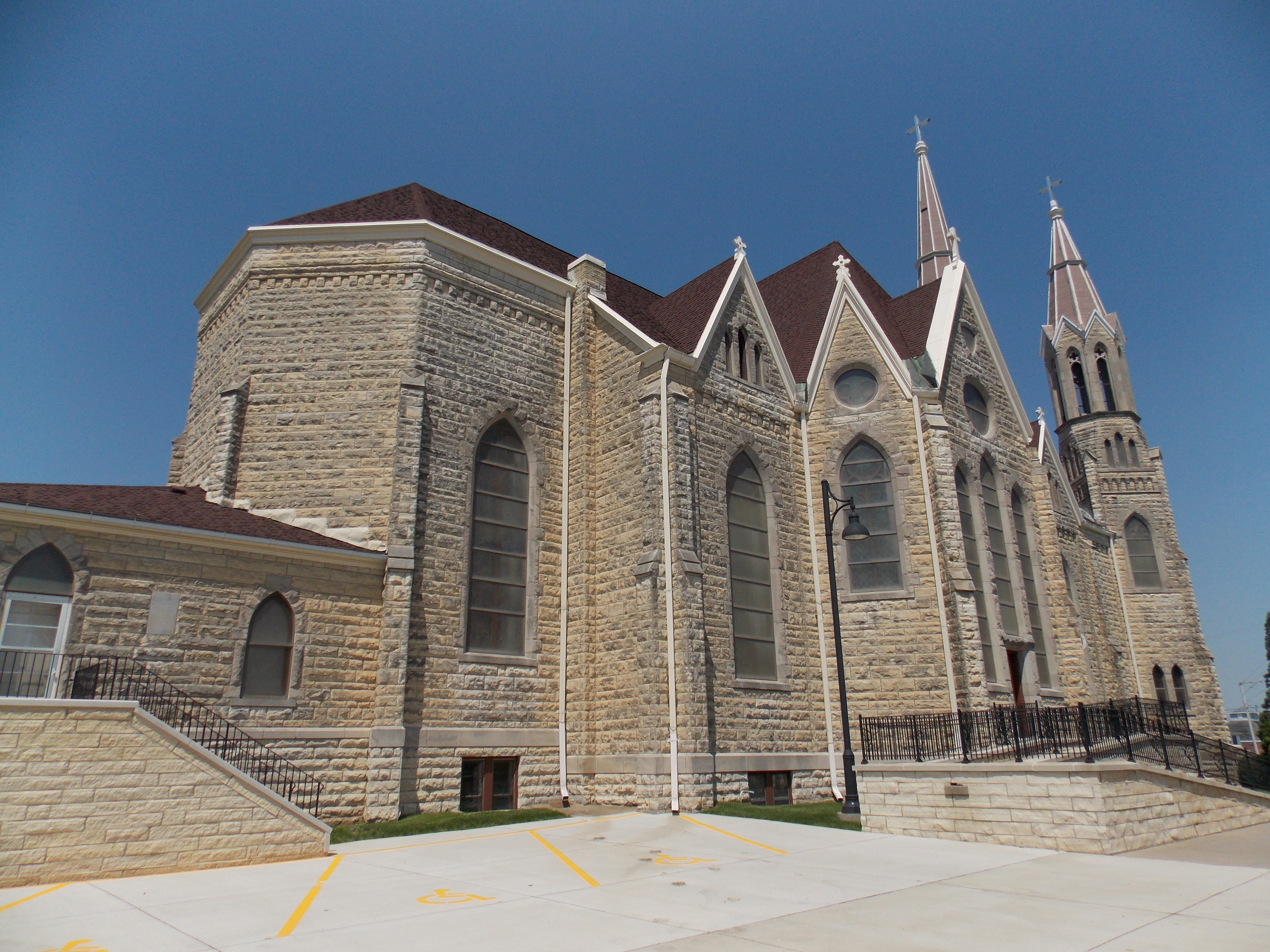
Rear elevation

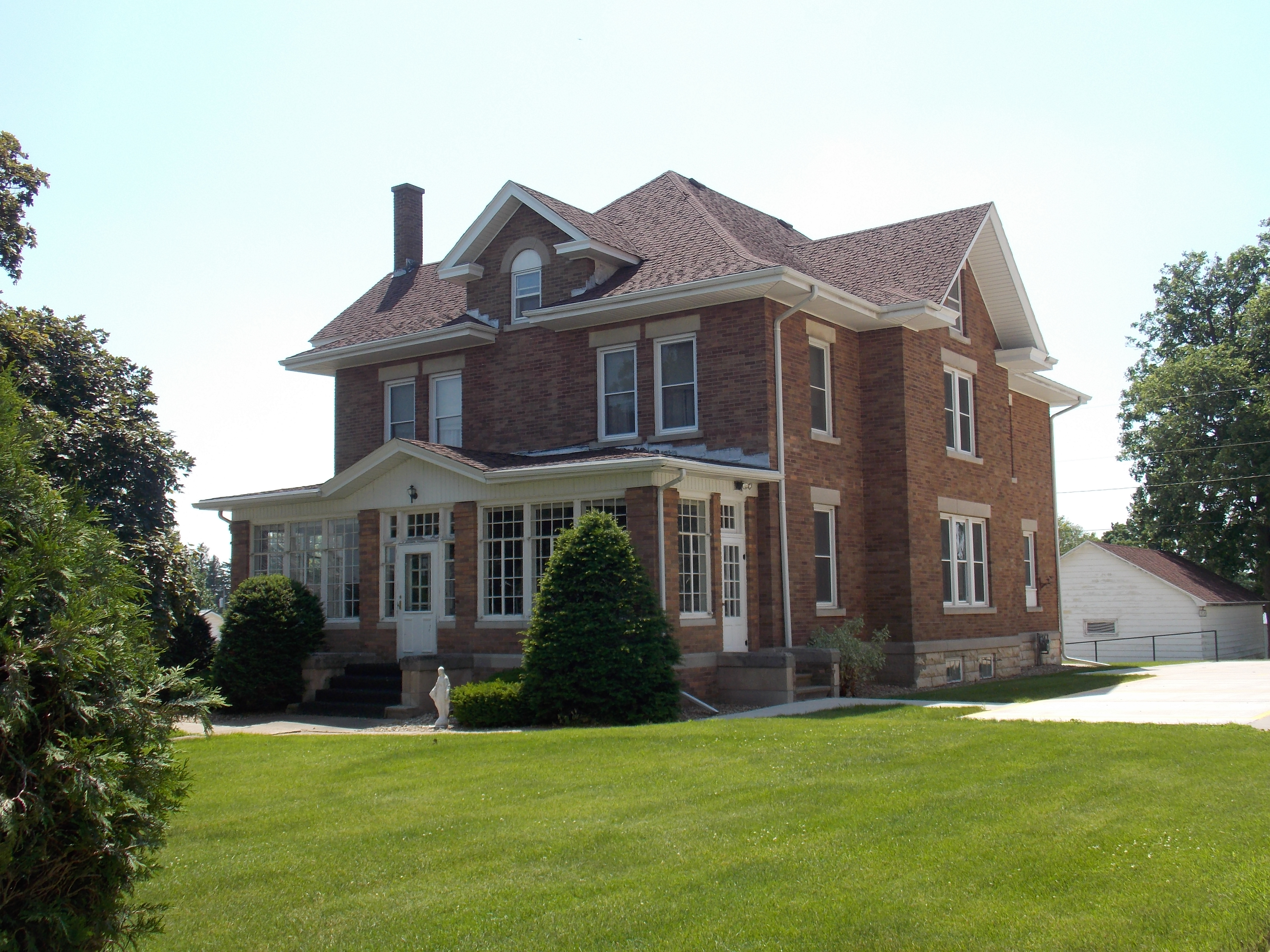
Rectory

== Architecture ==
The church is, by far, the dominant structure in the village of Petersburg. The cross-shaped structure is 150 by 54 feet (46 by 16 m), and 74 feet (23 m) wide at the transept. The tall central tower and spire on the main facade rises 145 feet (44 m). It is flanked by two 120 feet (37 m) towers on the corners of the facade. The side elevations are six bays long, including the corner tower and the transept. Each bay features a large lancet window below a grouping of three small lancet windows in a wall dormer above. Rose windows replace the window groups in the wall dormers on the transept. In the rear of the structure is a polygonal apse surrounded by a rectangular sacristy.

== School ==
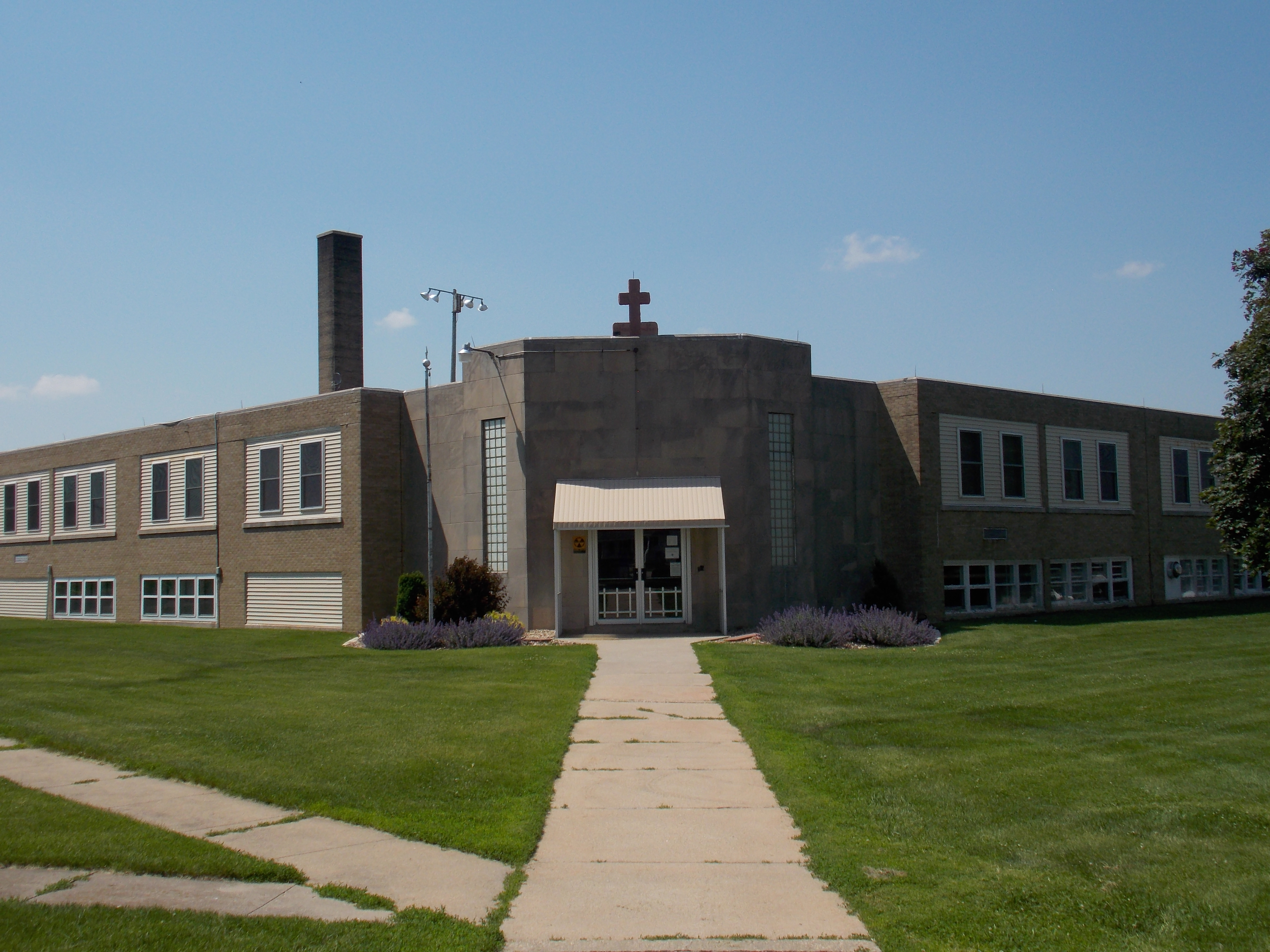
Saints Peter and Paul School, later the Petersburg campus of Archbishop Hennessy Catholic School

Prior to 1987 Saints Peter and Paul School served as the parish school.

Archbishop Hennessy Catholic School formed in 1987 as part of a consolidation, which had two locations: grades K-3 in New Vienna and preschool and 4-6 in Petersburg. It served as the joint parish school for Saints Peter and Paul as well as Saint Boniface Church in New Vienna. Enrollment was over 100 at that time. The school had a relationship with Beckman Catholic High School in Dyersville. In 2013 the school consolidated all grades into its Petersburg location. Its enrollment at that time was 60. Enrollments consistently decreased prior to 2017: by 2017 the school only had 45 students. Archbishop Hennessy closed in 2018.

The remaining Catholic grade school in the "Spires of Faith" Catholic church network is St. Francis Xavier Catholic School in Dyersville.
