= Frederick Velguth =

American architect (b. 1838, d. 1914)

- Born: March 13, 1838
- Died: April 19, 1914 (aged 76)
- Occupation: Architect
- Spouse: Sophia Junger

Frederick W. Velguth (March 13, 1838 – April 9, 1914) was an architect in Milwaukee, Wisconsin. Several buildings he designed are listed on the National Register of Historic Places.

He came to Milwaukee from Magdeburg, Germany, in 1858.

He began his career as a carpenter. He designed elaborate staircases.

He married Sophia Junger in 1862.

== Work ==
- Charles Abresch House, 2126 W. Juneau Avenue in Milwaukee, NRHP listed
- Christ Evangelical Lutheran Church (1901) at 2235 W. Greenfield Avenue in Milwaukee, NRHP listed
- Trinity Evangelical Lutheran Church (1878) at 1046 N. 9th Street in Milwaukee, NRHP listed; suffered a major fire in 2018.
- Trinity Evangelical Lutheran Church (1884) at 10729 West Freistadt Road in Mequon, Wisconsin
- Zion Lutheran Church at 912 N. Oneida Street in Appleton, Wisconsin, NRHP listed
- Republican House
- Arcadia Lutheran Church (1888) in Arcadia, Michigan
- Adolph Schoenleber Building
- German Theater
- Skating rink
