= Saint Boniface Church (New Vienna, Iowa) =

- St. Boniface of New Vienna Historic District
- U.S. National Register of Historic Places
- U.S. Historic district
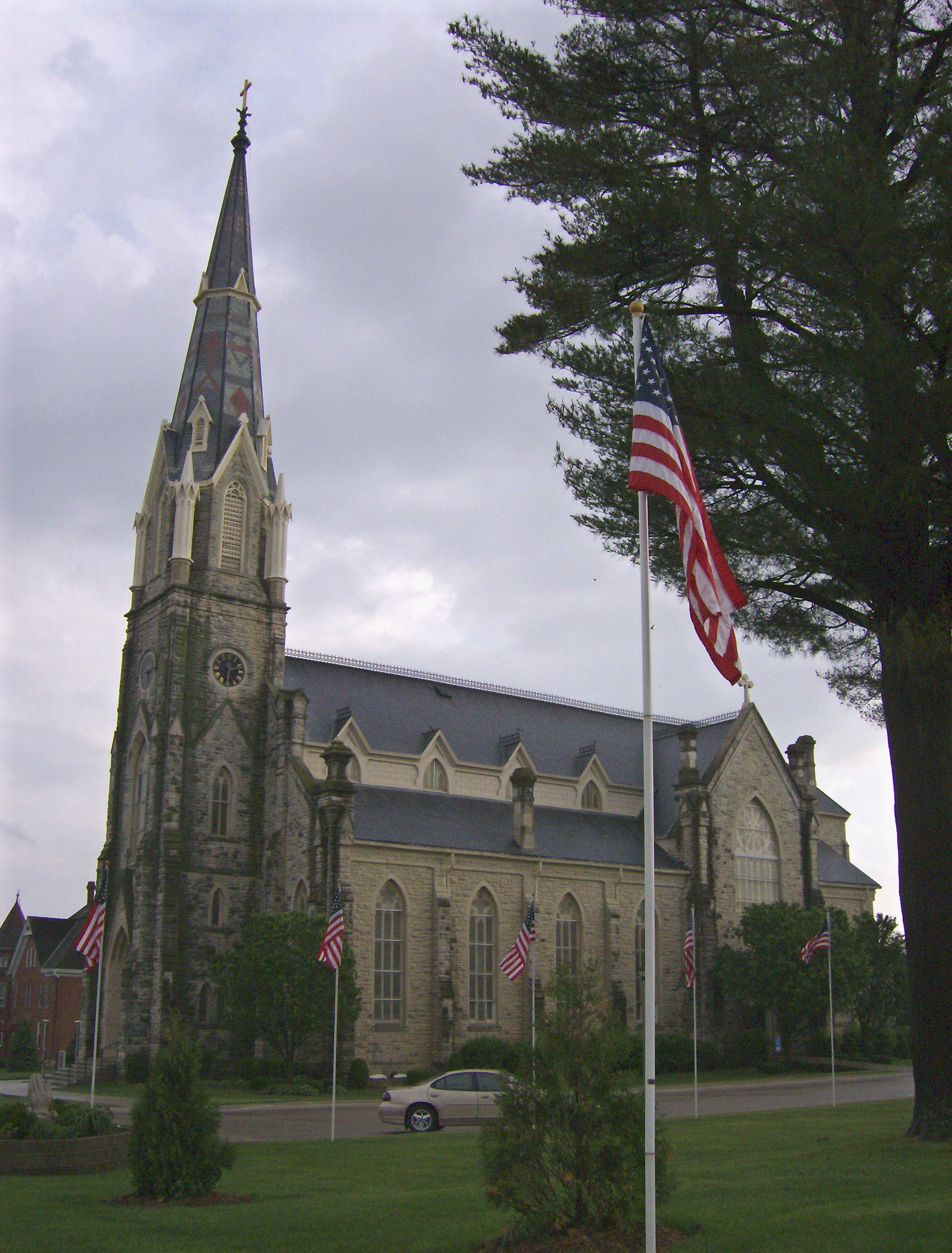

- Location within Iowa Location within the United States
- Location: 7401 Columbus St. New Vienna, Iowa
- Coordinates: 42°33′3″N 91°6′54″W
- Area: 10 acres (4.0 ha)
- Architect: Schnell Architects; Byrne & Soul
- Architectural style: Queen Anne
- NRHP reference No.: 99001207
- Added to NRHP: September 29, 1999

Saint Boniface Church is the Catholic parish church for the city of New Vienna, Iowa and the surrounding area. It is a Gothic-style church, with stained glass windows, a handcarved main altar, and a striking 200-foot (61 m) spire The parish, part of the Archdiocese of Dubuque, is partnered with Ss. Peter and Paul Parish, Petersburg, Iowa - the two parishes share a pastor.

== History ==
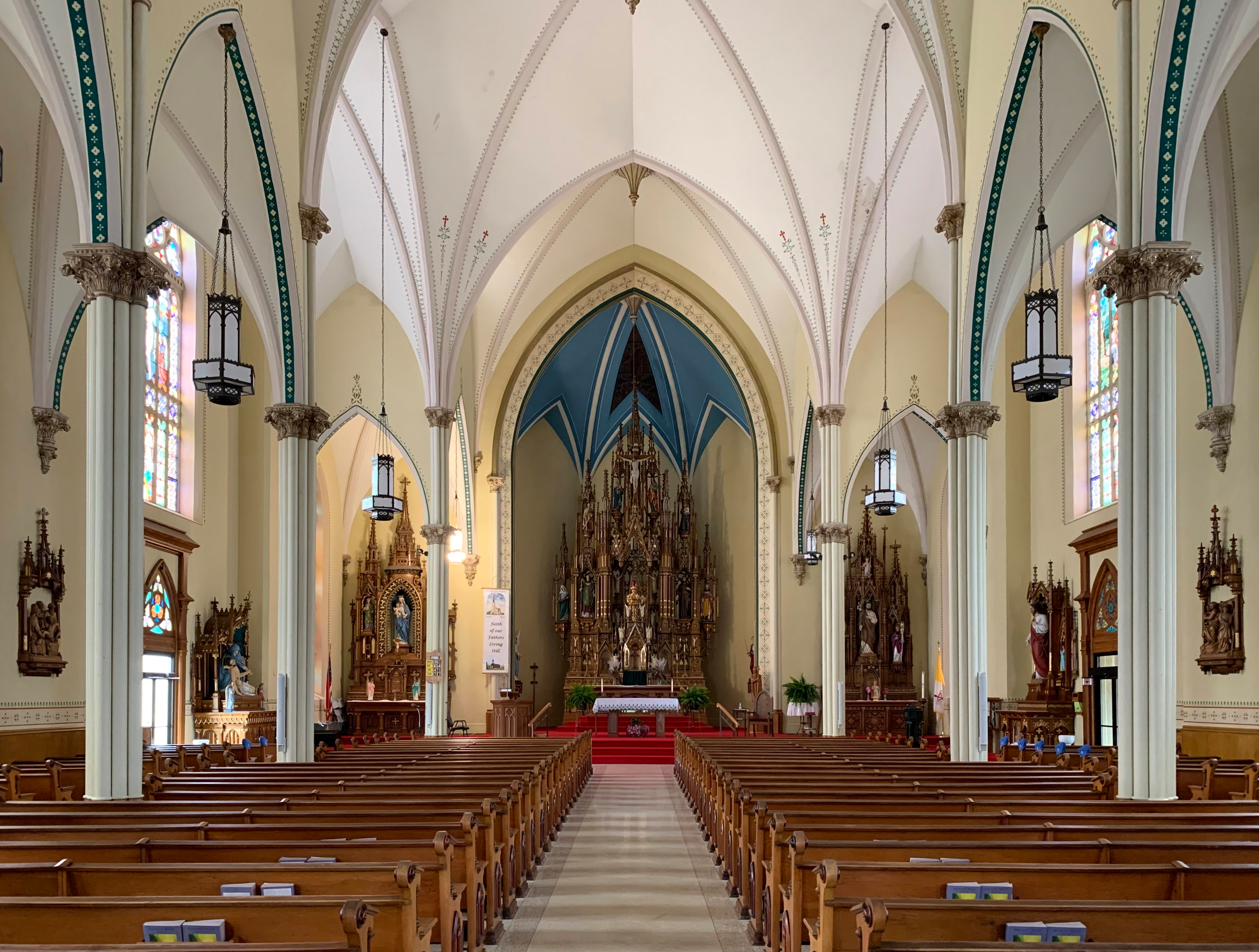
Church interior

The history of the parish can be traced back to the 1840s when a number of German American families came to the area from Ohio in search of farmland. On January 6, 1846, Bishop Mathias Loras of Dubuque celebrated Mass at the home of Hermann Wiechmann, the first Mass celebrated in the New Vienna area. For the next two years, Mass was celebrated at the Wiechmann home.

In 1848, the first permanent structure was built. This wood building measured 24 feet (7.3 m) by 30 feet (9.1 m) and had walls that were 10 feet (3.0 m) high.

By 1853, the population had increased to the point that a new structure was needed. Construction of this new church was completed in 1855. The church was 64 by 100 feet (30 m) with 22-foot (6.7 m)-high walls. A local resident, William Steffen Sr., was sent with two teams of horses to get three bells for the church. He arrived back in New Vienna just before Easter; the bells were raised in time to chime for the first time on Easter Sunday. This second structure was used until 1887.

In 1887, the third and present building was completed. This building is 172 feet (52 m) long by 62 feet (19 m) wide. The walls are 35 feet (11 m) high. The stained glass windows are 14 feet (4.3 m) wide by 30 feet (9.1 m) high. The steeple is 200 feet (61 m) high.

The church has five altars made of carved wood which are still present in the church today. The old high altar was built by E. Hackner of La Crosse, Wisconsin. This altar cost $5,000.

The organ was built in 1891 by the Schuelke Organ Company. The organ at St. Boniface is one of the few intact Schuelke organs that still exist today. Aside from regular maintenance, the organ has remained basically unaltered over the years. One of the few alterations made to the organ was the addition of an electric blower in the 20th century.

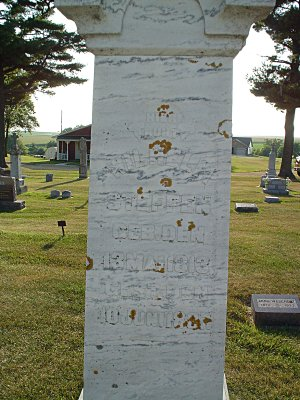
The final resting place of William Steffen Sr. As with many of the stones from that time period in the cemetery, the inscription on his monument is in German.

In 2010 workers began constructing a new entryway on the north side of the church when a sinkhole that was 12 feet wide and 8 feet deep was discovered in the basement. It is not known when the sinkhole formed, but if it had taken out a nearby pillar it could have caused the church building to collapse.

== School ==
Saint Boniface previously had its own parish school, Saint Boniface School, which started operations in 1847. Classes were initially held in private residences before being held inside the church facility. It received a permanent school building in 1870. The school moved into the church in 1922, and a new school building opened in 1924.

In 1987 it consolidated into Archbishop Hennessy Catholic School, which had two locations: grades K-3 in New Vienna, and preschool and 4-6 in Petersburg. It served as the joint parish school for Saint Boniface as well as Saints Peter and Paul Church in Petersburg. Enrollment was over 100 at that time. The school had a relationship with Beckman Catholic High School in Dyersville. In 2013 the school consolidated all grades into its Petersburg location. Its enrollment at that time was 60. Enrollments consistently decreased prior to 2017: by 2017 the school only had 45 students. Archbishop Hennessy closed in 2018.

The remaining Catholic grade school in the "Spires of Faith" Catholic church network is St. Francis Xavier Catholic School in Dyersville.
