= Christ Evangelical Lutheran Church =

Historic church in Wisconsin, United States

- U.S. National Register of Historic Places
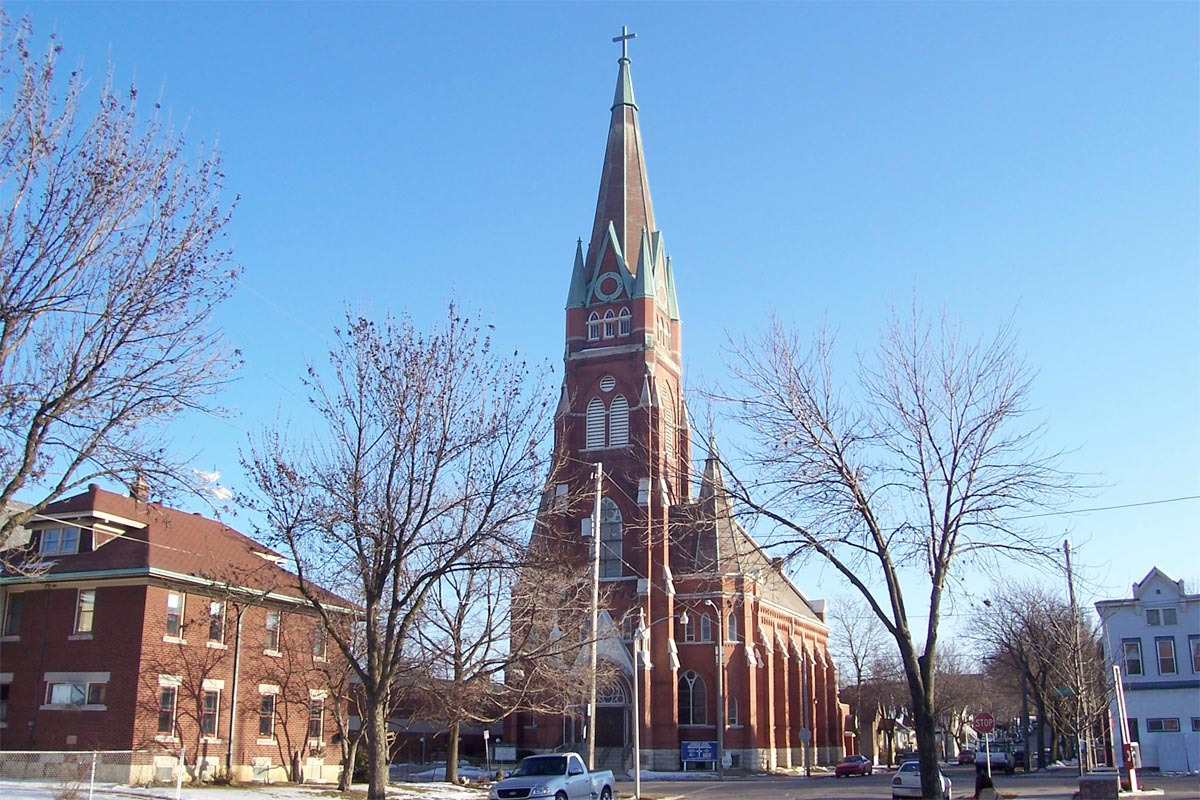
- Christ Evangelical Lutheran Church
- Location: 2235 W. Greenfield Ave. Milwaukee, Wisconsin
- Nearest city: Milwaukee
- Coordinates: 43°1′1.19″N 87°56′30.50″W
- Built: 1901
- Architect: Frederick Velguth
- Architectural style: Gothic Revival
- NRHP reference No.: 87001735
- Added to NRHP: September 25, 1987

Christ Evangelical Lutheran Church is a historic church built in 1901 by a German Lutheran congregation southwest of the Walker's Point neighborhood of Milwaukee, Wisconsin. It is listed on the National Register of Historic Places.

== History ==
Christ Evangelical Lutheran Church was founded in 1884 by thirteen families who were peacefully released from St. Peter's Evangelical Lutheran Church. Services were initially conducted in a private home. Later in 1884, Christ Evangelical Lutheran Church erected a wooden building east of the present church. This structure housed both church and school until 1901 and the school until the early 1970s.

The church was designed by architect Frederick Velguth in the German Gothic Revival style and built in 1901. Akin to Trinity Evangelical Lutheran Church across the Menomonee River, it features a landmark spire and sandstone details on the façade. Construction of the church started early in 1901 and was almost complete for the December 1, 1901 dedication, although the heating system was not finished and the trumpets froze in the cold church.

In 1884, the church called the Rev. Heinrich Bergmann, then 25, as pastor. He served until his death in 1923. Bergmann's son, the Rev. Paul Bergmann, then served until his death in 1941.

The interior of the large, red-brick church is a century of art. Pews from the 1884 church are in the balcony. The 1901 pews are on the main floor, next to the large stained-glass windows from the same era. The altar, pulpit, lectern and a false door, as well as the roof and the cross atop the steeple are from the late 1940s.

The ceiling of the church, which contains gold leafing, is from 1984, as are the crosses painted on the walls behind the altar and many of the light fixtures.

One unique feature of the church is the basement windows, cut in the west wall at an angle to maximize afternoon sun.

The congregation conducted its final worship service on November 24, 2024, with the Rev. Joel Jaeger, a retired pastor of Christ, as guest pastor.
