= Energy Manufacturing Co. Inc =

Energy Manufacturing Co., Inc.
- Founded: Established in 1944
- Founder: Jerry Pasker
- Headquarters: Monticello, Iowa, United States
- Area served: Worldwide
- Products: Hydraulic cylinders, pumps, valves and power systems

Energy Manufacturing Co., Inc. is an American manufacturing company based in Monticello, Iowa. Established in 1944, the company produces a variety of hydraulic cylinders, hydraulic pumps, valves, and power systems.

== History ==
In the early 1940s B.J. Pasker ran a blacksmith shop in New Vienna, Iowa. In this shop his son, Jerry, produced farm wagons made from discarded automobile spindles and rims. During this period, Pasker also developed a hydraulically powered front loader which mounted to farm tractors. In 1944 Jerry Pasker outgrew the blacksmith shop and sought a larger facility for his operations.

== Energy in Monticello Iowa ==
Jerry Pasker moved to South Cedar Street in Monticello, Iowa and was introduced to Harold Sovereign, who sold John Deere tractors and equipment. Pasker and Sovereign formed a partnership known as Industrious Farmer Equipment Company, and moved the business to the vacant second floor of Sovereign's dealership on South Cedar Street. In 1946 the business again outgrew its facility. To accommodate the expansion, Pasker purchased the property of an auto dealership on Main Street. During that time the company manufactured hydraulic components, wagon hoists, truck hoists, valves and hydraulic cylinders. In 1948 the company's name was changed to Energy Farm Equipment Company. In 1962 the business incorporated to become Energy Manufacturing Company, Inc., by which it is still known.

Jerry Pasker was killed in a 22 July 1964 airplane crash in Winnipeg, Manitoba, Canada; the company presidency then passed to LaVon Pasker.

== Energy Manufacturing after Jerry Pasker ==
In 1976 Energy completed construction of a new plant on 11 acres (45,000 m^{2}) in the Monticello Industrial park. In 1985 Energy Manufacturing Company was sold to CGF Industries of Topeka, Kansas. CGF also purchased an Omaha Nebraska company called "Williams Machine and Tool". In 1997 Energy was purchased by Lincolnshire Partners and in 1999 Energy was purchased by Textron, Inc. Textron ran the company for 5 years until Energy was acquired by an investment group. On November 15, 2005 Energy added to the facility office space for administrative and manufacturing support.

== Energy 2005 - 2013 ==
Energy designs and manufactures custom welded hydraulic cylinders. It also designs and manufactures hydraulic valves, pumps, powerpacks and power systems. Energy's cylinders are used in construction, road machinery, forestry, man lift and hoist, industrial bailer, waste compacting, and agricultural industries. Energy manufactures a wide variety of hydraulic cylinders; welded, tie-rod, ram-type, rephasing, telescopic, and position-sensing. Energy has designed and manufactured hydraulic cylinders with bores from less than one inch (2.5 cm), up to 11 inches (28 cm). Cylinders have been manufactured with strokes up to 15 feet (4.5 cm). Energy has designed cylinders with working pressures as high as 10,000 psig (690 bar).

== Energy Manufacturing sold ==
On May 30, 2013 Ligon Industries LLC acquired Energy Manufacturing Co. Inc.,. Ligon Industries, LLC was founded in 1999, and is located in Birmingham, Alabama. In addition to Energy Manufacturing, Ligon holds 13 other manufacturing companies, seven of which are in the fluid power industry. Ligon is the largest independent manufacturer of hydraulic cylinders in North America.

== See also ==
- Hydraulic cylinder
- Telescopic cylinder
- Tie Rod Cylinder
