= Organ Supply Industries =

Organ Supply Industries, Incorporated is a pipe organ parts manufacturer founded in 1924 as the Organ Supply Corporation in Erie, Pennsylvania. With over 46,000 square feet (4,300 m^{2}) of manufacturing floor, it is the largest organ parts supplier in North America.

== History ==
Burdett Organ Co of Erie attends first U.S. World's Fair in Philadelphia for centennial in 1876

Organ Supply Industries has its origins in two organ builders whom Erie investors encouraged to move their operations to Erie in the late 19th century. They include the Burdett Reed Organ Company, of Chicago, a reed organ manufacturer whose operation was destroyed in the Great Chicago Fire of 1871; and the A. B. Felgemaker Organ Company, originally of Buffalo, New York. The Tellers-Kent Organ Company, sprang from two Felgemaker employees in 1906.

A. B. Felgemaker sent Anton Gottfried and his colleague Henry Kugel from Philadelphia, Pennsylvania to Erie, where they set up shop in the Felgemaker plant. The A. Gottfried Organ Company relocated to its own Erie facilities in 1905. Gottfried and Kugel had previously worked for the Haskell Company, a prominent organ manufacturer in Philadelphia. Fred Durst, of Hinners Organ Company of Pekin, Illinois, joined as superintendent of A. Gottfried Organ Company in 1917. Harry Auch and John Hallas, of the Haskell Company, came to Erie in 1920 to join Gottfried, Kugel, and Kugel's son Harry Kugel in the formation of a metal organ pipe manufacturer called National Organ Supply. Durst and Henry Kugel's sons Harry and Ruben Kugel formed Organ Supply Corporation in 1924. The pipe manufacturing company was purchased by Organ Supply Corporation in 1958. Fred Gluck purchased the Organ Supply Corporation in the early 1970s and merged it with Durst and Company (Note: Durst & Co. was formed in 1926 and acquired the Erie Reed Pipe Company in 1933.) to form Durst Organ Supply Company, Incorporated. The name was changed to Organ Supply Industries, Incorporated in 1978.
