= Schuelke Organ Company =

Milwaukee, Wisconsin-based pipe organ builder

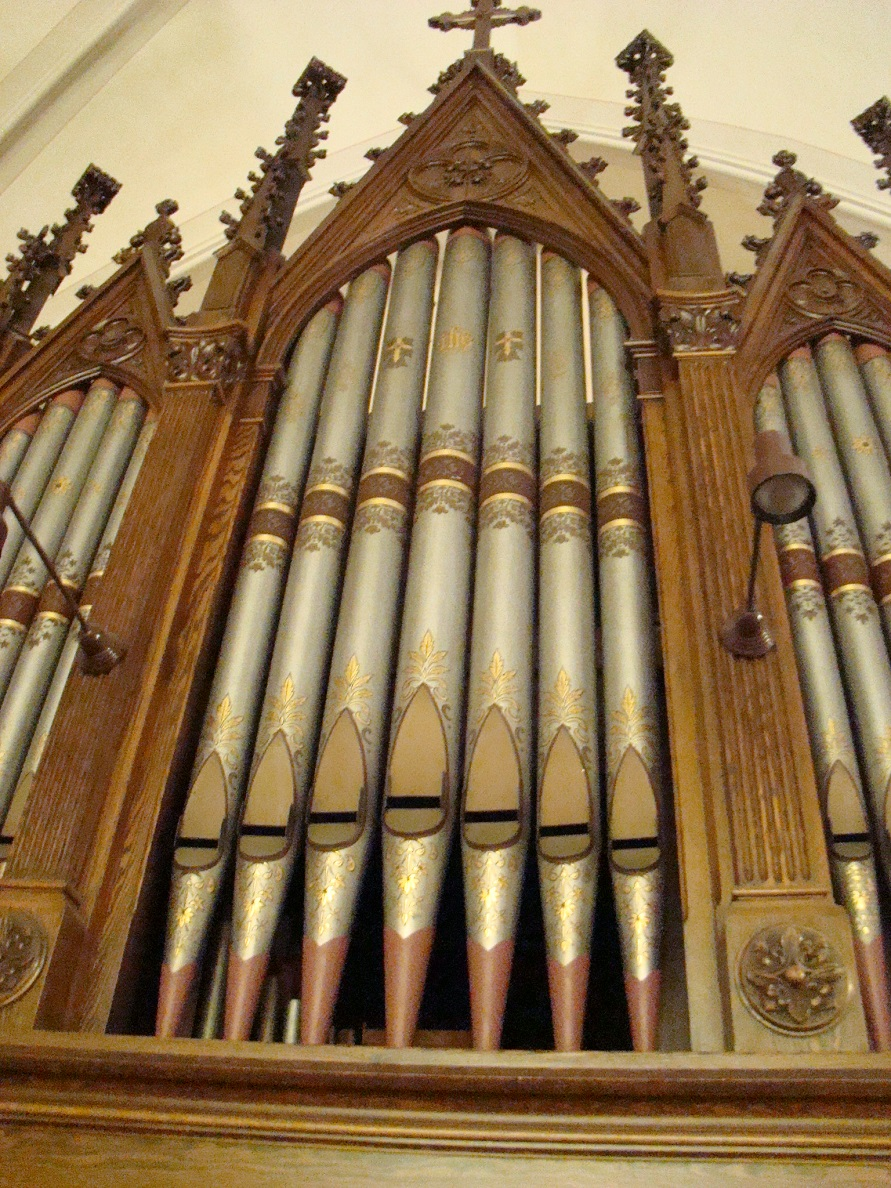
Pipework of the Schuelke Organ at Our Lady of the Lake Catholic Church, Ashland, Wisconsin. The organ was installed in 1904 and remains mostly original.

The Schuelke Organ Company was a Milwaukee, Wisconsin-based pipe organ builder. Schuelke Organs operated in the later 19th and early 20th centuries.

William Schuelke (born April 13, 1849 in Konitz, West Prussia as Wilhelm Schülke; died 1902) was a Prussian immigrant who came to the United States in 1866. Schuelke's contributions to organ building included inventing the electric motor powered bellows crank, for which he received a patent. This was a major improvement over existing hand-cranked bellows.

The Schuelke Organ Company ceased operations in the early 20th century. Today, few of the organs his company produced exist intact.

A yearly free organ recital is held at Saint Francis of Assisi Catholic Church, Milwaukee on the first Sunday of November to showcase its 1885 Schuelke pipe organ.

== Locations with a Schuelke organ ==
- First Presbyterian Church, Leadville, Colorado
- John Paul II Roman Catholic Church, Carroll, Iowa
- Saint Boniface Church, New Vienna, Iowa
- Saint Mary's Catholic Church, Remsen, Iowa
- Bethany Lutheran Church, Ishpeming, Michigan
- Saint Anthony of Padua Church, St. Louis, Missouri
- St. Mary's in the Mountains Catholic Church, Virginia City, Nevada
- Fourteen Holy Helpers Church, Gardenville, West Seneca, New York
- Saint Mary's Catholic Church, Columbus, Ohio
- First Baptist Church, Vermillion, South Dakota
- Our Lady of the Lake Catholic Church, Ashland, Wisconsin
- Ozaukee Congregational Church, Grafton, Wisconsin
- Emmanuel Lutheran Church, Mecan, Wisconsin
- First Lutheran Church, Middleton, Wisconsin
- Saint Anthony of Padua Catholic Church, Milwaukee, Wisconsin
- Saint Francis of Assisi Catholic Church, Milwaukee, Wisconsin
- Trinity Evangelical Lutheran Church, Milwaukee, Wisconsin destroyed by fire, May 15, 2018
- First Presbyterian Church, Waunakee, Wisconsin
