= Charles Abresch Company =

American vehicle manufacturer

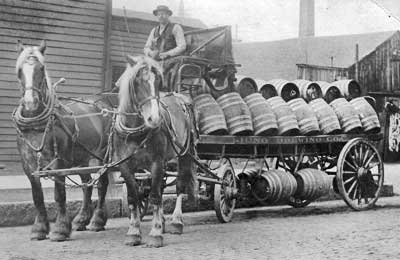
A Charles Abresch Company brewery wagon loaded with beer kegs

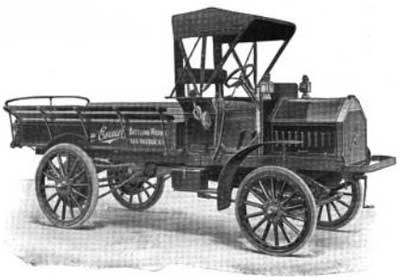
A 1911 Abresch-Cramer Auto Truck Company truck, with Model A 1.5-2 tn express coachwork

The Charles Abresch Company was a carriage and wagon factory and an automotive, commercial vehicle and body manufacturer based in Milwaukee, Wisconsin. Brand names were Abresch and, for trucks, the Abresch-Cramer Auto Truck Company.

The company was founded in 1871 by Charles Abresch, a German immigrant who initially specialized in building beer wagons.

In 1884 it was reorganized as a public company. Charles Abresch continued to lead, Andrew Hofherr, a cigar manufacturer, became Vice President and Harry P. Ellis became CFO and Secretary. Louis Schneller and H. Paul were active business partners in the company.

In 1892 Abresch invested US $35,000 in the expansion of the plant. A change of name to Charles Abresch Company, Incorporated took place circa 1893, but it is unclear whether the entry in the commercial register was made at that time or earlier and was now replenished. By 1894 the company had over 800 employees.

The company later transitioned to build car and truck bodies, beginning in 1899. This business grew quickly as customers switched from horse-drawn wagons to motor vehicles.

In the mid 1960s, the company ended its manufacturing activities after losing its contract with Harley-Davidson, which involved a partnership in which the company manufactured motorcycle sidecars. After this, the company exclusively performed auto body work.

== Charles Abresch House ==
The Charles Abresch House is a 2 1/2-story Queen Anne home with 3-story tower, designed by Frederick Velguth and built in 1890. It is located at 2126 W. Juneau Avenue in Milwaukee, Wisconsin and is listed on the National Register of Historic Places.

== Gallery ==
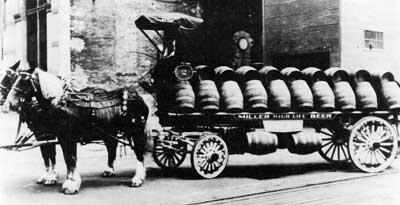
A Charles Abresch Company brewery wagon for Miller brewery, Milwaukee, 1888

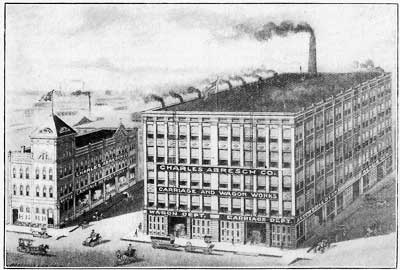
The Charles Abresch Company plant in Milwaukee, 1903

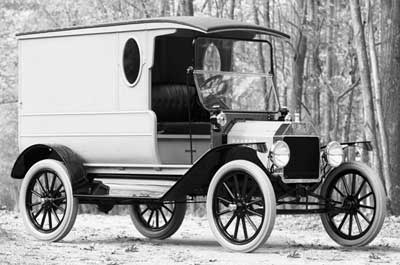
A 1916 Ford Model T delivery van with coachwork by the Charles Abresch Co.

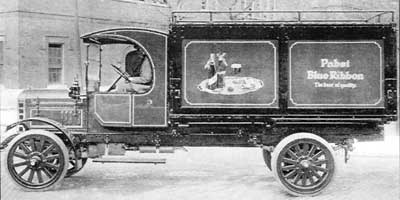
1918 Sterling Beer Wagon Abresch body for Pabst Brewing Company
