= Matt Tobin =

American football player (born 1990)

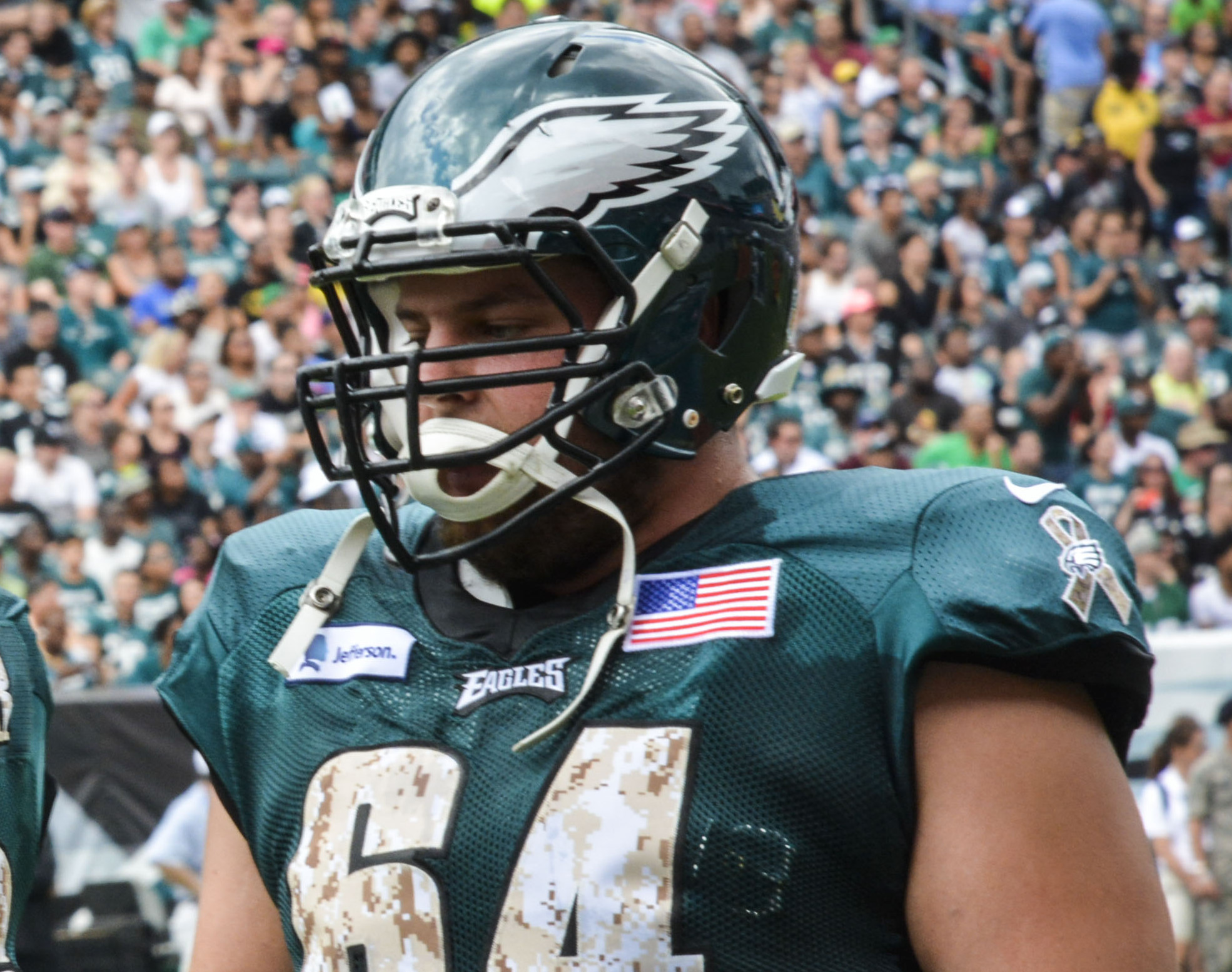
- Tobin with the Philadelphia Eagles in 2015

No. 64, 73
- Position: Offensive tackle

Personal information
- Born: June 5, 1990 (age 36); Worthington, Iowa, U.S.
- Listed height: 6 ft 6 in (1.98 m)
- Listed weight: 310 lb (141 kg)

Career information
- High school: Beckman Catholic (Dyersville, Iowa)
- College: Iowa
- NFL draft: 2013: undrafted

Career history
- Philadelphia Eagles (2013–2016); Seattle Seahawks (2017); New England Patriots (2018)*; San Francisco 49ers (2018); New England Patriots (2018)
- * Offseason or practice squad member only

Career NFL statistics
- Games played: 57
- Games started: 21
- Stats at Pro Football Reference

Matt Tobin (born June 5, 1990) is an American former professional football player who was an offensive tackle in the National Football League (NFL). He played college football for the Iowa Hawkeyes, and was signed by the Philadelphia Eagles as an undrafted free agent in 2013.

== Early life ==
Matt Tobin went to school at St. Paul's elementary school in Worthington, IA. After graduating in 6th grade, he attended Beckman Catholic High School in Dyersville, IA. Tobin did not start a game until his senior season in high school, in which he was selected to the second-team all-state. He was named to the first-team all-District and all-Area also in his senior season, in which he was named captain of all-Area squad.

== College career ==
Tobin played college football as a walk on at the University of Iowa, where he started his final 22 games.

== Professional career ==
=== Philadelphia Eagles ===
On April 29, 2013, he signed with the Philadelphia Eagles as an undrafted free agent.

On December 12, 2016, Tobin was placed on injured reserve after suffering a knee injury in Week 14.

=== Seattle Seahawks ===
On August 21, 2017, Tobin was traded, along with the Eagles' 2018 seventh round pick, to the Seattle Seahawks in exchange for their 2018 fifth round pick.

=== New England Patriots ===
On March 17, 2018, Tobin signed with the New England Patriots. On September 1, Tobin was released as part of the roster cutdown.

=== San Francisco 49ers ===
On September 3, 2018, Tobin signed a one-year deal with the San Francisco 49ers. He was released on September 19, 2018.

=== New England Patriots (second stint) ===
On November 7, 2018, Tobin was re-signed by the New England Patriots. On November 26, 2018, the Patriots waived Tobin.
