= Beckman Catholic High School =

Private secondary school in Dyersville, Iowa, United States

Location
- 1325 9th Street SE; Dyersville, (Dubuque County), Iowa 52040; United States; 42°28′22″N 91°6′51″W

Information
- Type: Private, Coeducational
- Religious affiliation: Roman Catholic
- Established: 1966
- Principal: Marcel Kielkucki
- Faculty: 55
- Grades: 7–12
  - Grade 9: 59
  - Grade 10: 65
  - Grade 11: 101
  - Grade 12: 68
- Colors: Green and Gold
- Athletics conference: River Valley East
- Nickname: Zers
- Team name: Trailblazers
- Newspaper: Outpost
- Dean of Students/Athletic Director: Todd Troutman
- Website: School Website

Beckman Catholic High School is a private, Roman Catholic high school in Dyersville, Iowa. It is located in the Roman Catholic Archdiocese of Dubuque.

== Background ==
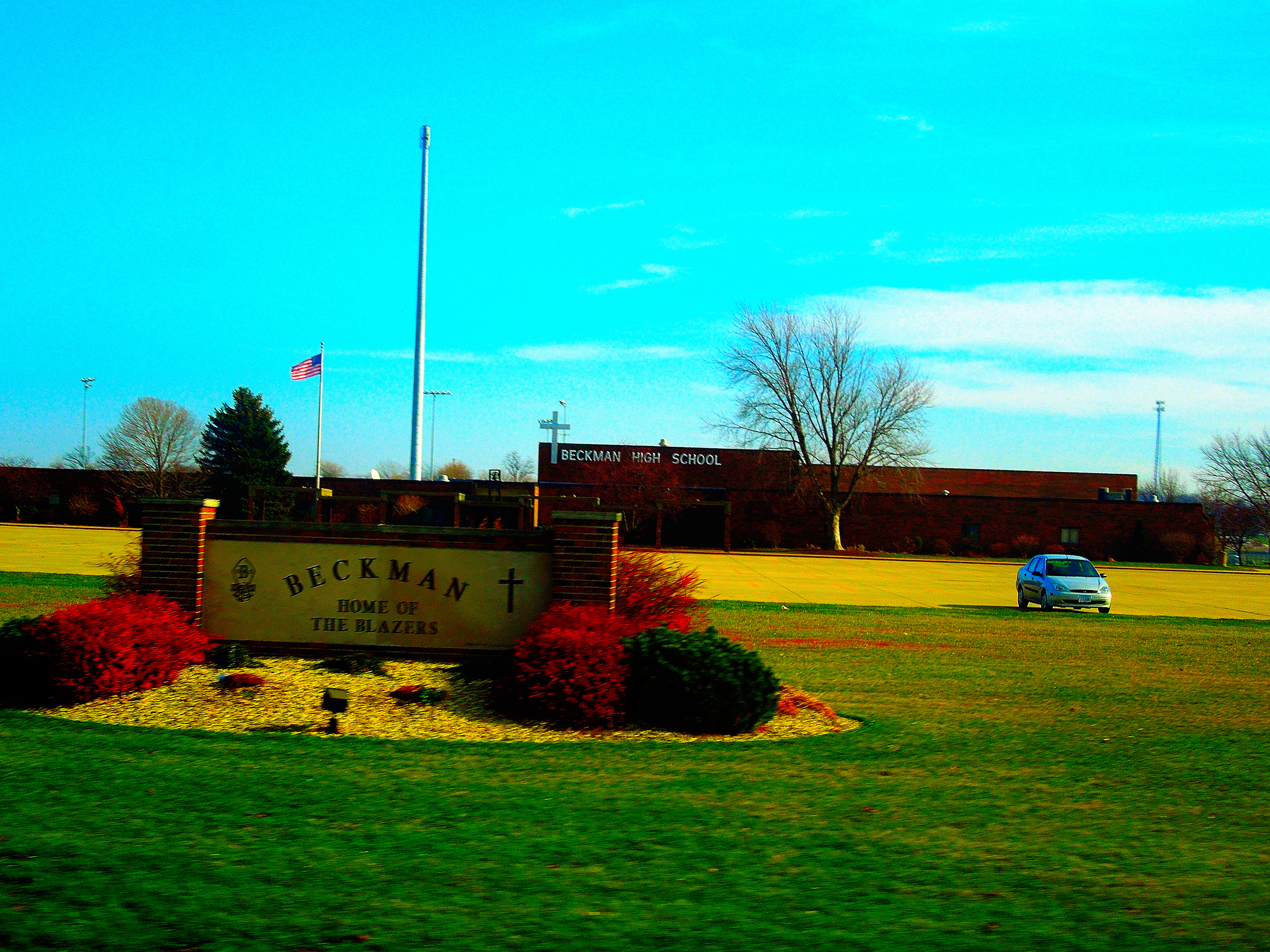
Exterior of the building

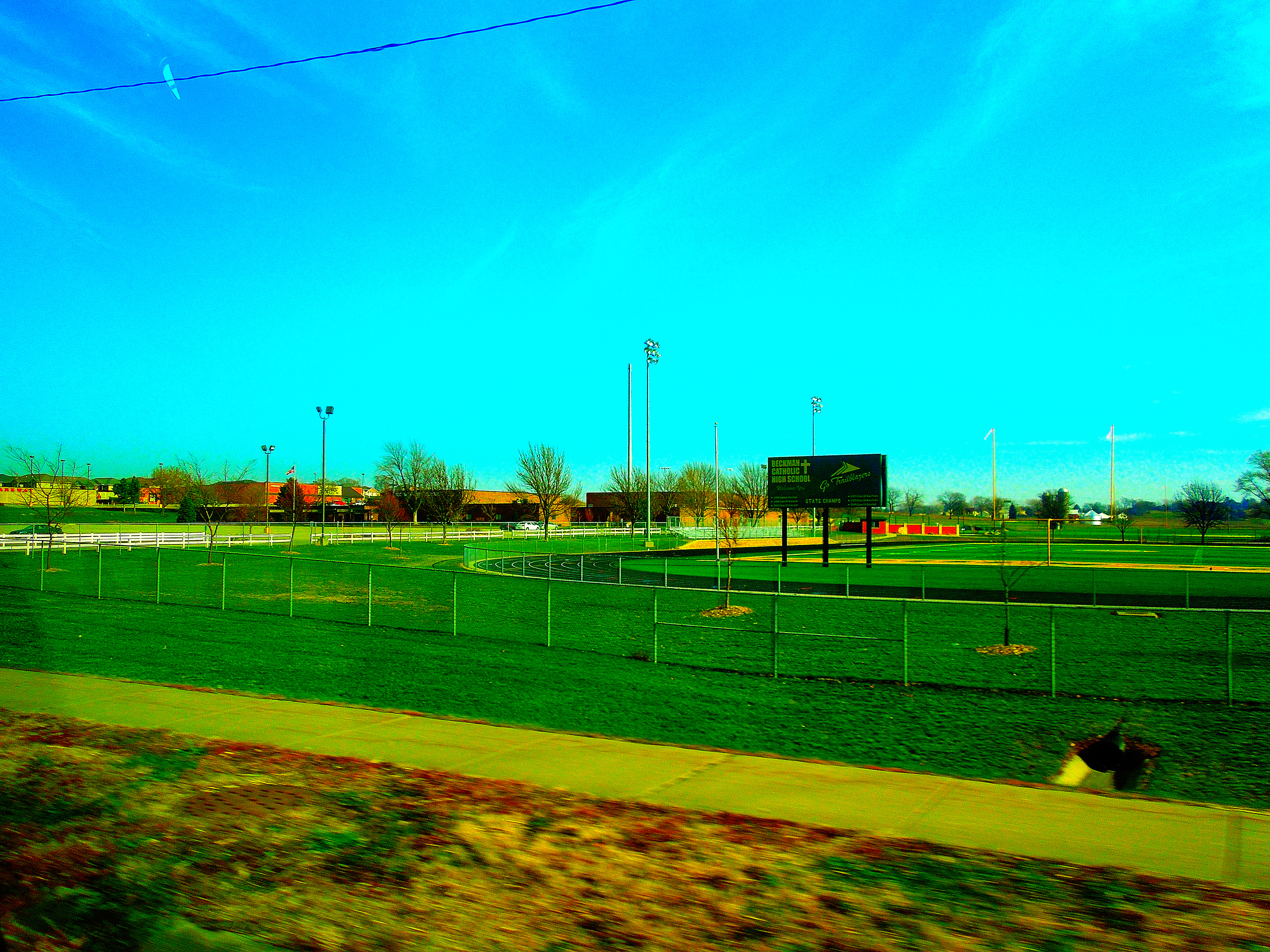
Athletic fields

Beckman Catholic High School was founded in 1966 as a consolidated Catholic high school serving several Catholic parishes in and around Dubuque and Delaware County. The school is named after Archbishop Francis J. L. Beckman, sixth bishop of the Dubuque Archdiocese (1930–1946). In recent years, Beckman has been nationally ranked as a top 20 academic U.S. Catholic high school, a top 50 U.S. Catholic high school, and a top 50 Iowa AP high school.

== Feeder schools ==
Previously Beckman Catholic had a relationship with Archbishop Hennessy Catholic School, the joint parish school of Saints Peter and Paul Church in Petersburg and Saint Boniface Church in New Vienna.

== Athletics ==
Beckman Catholic High School is a member of the Iowa High School Athletic Association. They have won the following IHSAA State Championships:

- Boys Baseball - 1968, 1986, 2000, 2012, 2013, 2017, 2023
- Boys Soccer - 2015, 2016
- Boys Track and Field - 1997, 1999
- Boys Golf - Class 2A
- Girls Golf - 1992, 2012, 2015

== Academics ==
- Co-ed Speech - 2007 State Champions

== Notable alumni ==
- Dave Haight, Former All-American and Big Ten Defensive Lineman of the Year for the Iowa Hawkeyes
- Mike Haight, Former NFL player (New York Jets, Washington Redskins)
- Matt Tobin, Former NFL player (Philadelphia Eagles, Seattle Seahawks)

== See also ==
- List of high schools in Iowa
