= Felgemaker Organ Company =

The Felgemaker Organ Company was a manufacturer of pipe organs based out of Erie, Pennsylvania, in the late 19th and early 20th centuries.

== History ==
It was founded in Buffalo, New York in 1865 but relocated to Erie, Pennsylvania. In 1872, the company was known as the Derrick and Felgemaker Pipe Organ Company. During the 1870s, the company employed over 55 workers and had $75,000 worth of capital. Specialties of the company included church organs and portable pipe organs for small churches, schools and residential parlors. By 1878 the company was renamed as the A.B. Felgemaker Company, relocating the factory to larger facilities in 1888 and 1890.

At the invitation of Mr. Felgemaker, German organ maker Anton Gottfried moved to Erie in 1894, where he leased space from the Felgemaker plant. In 1911, amid booming business, the Erie factory underwent major renovations, adding open two-story factory floor space, renovating the offices, electrifying, and adding an electric travelling crane. The A.B. Felgemaker Company remained in business until 1917. Several workers from the Felgemaker Company, including Gottfried, joined to form the Organ Supply Industries in Erie, which is today North America's largest pipe organ manufacturer and supply house.

The company produced organs until 1918, when it ceased operations. The company's service agreements and pending contracts were then assumed by the Tellers-Kent Organ Company.

== Surviving organs ==
Organs produced by the company are still in use at Lawrence University, Appleton Wisconsin, St. John's Lutheran Church, Erie, Pennsylvania, Crawford Memorial United Methodist Church, Bronx, New York, Trinity Episcopal Church, Iowa City, Iowa, St. John's Episcopal Church, Canandaigua, New York, First Congregational Church, St. Johns, Michigan, First Christian Church (Disciples of Christ), Elizabeth City, North Carolina, Sacred Heart Music Center, Duluth, Minnesota, Spencerport United Methodist Church, Spencerport, New York, and Prince of Peace Evangelical Lutheran Church, Bangor, Pennsylvania, Zion Evangelical Lutheran Church, Minersville, Pennsylvania has a A.B. Felgemaker that was installed in 1906, Zion Lutheran Church, Everett, Pennsylvania has a A.B. Felgemaker Organ that was installed in 1903.

A Felgemaker tracker pipe organ is played each week at First Baptist Church, Madison, Indiana, which was installed in 1900. In 2010, the Bradley Rule Company of Knoxville, Tennessee removed the organ from the church and completely refurbished it. It cost the church $93,000 and took about ten months to finish.

An additional organ exists at Emmanuel Lutheran in Pottstown, Pennsylvania, however, the organ has been rebuilt four times since Felgemaker's presence and its remaining extent is indeterminant.

Capitol Hill Seventh-day Adventist Church in Washington, DC maintains one of the original Felgemaker pipe organs, produced before 1917. Two still exist in Buffalo at the former St. Agnes RC Church (relocated from Sacred Heart RC in Buffalo) and Emmanual Temple SDA, originally St. Stephen's Evangelical. Trinity Evangelical Lutheran Church in Taneytown, Maryland, has a Felgemaker pipe organ built in 1897. It was completely restored in 1987 by the Columbia Organ Works and is still in weekly Sunday service.

Emmanuel Catholic Church in Dayton, Ohio originally dedicated its three-division Felgemaker pipe organ in 1887. Since then, the organ has undergone multiple major renovations and additions, most recently in 2015. Formal re-dedication of the Emmanuel Felgemaker organ is scheduled for November 11, 2016.

Freemasons' Hall in Indianapolis has 6 matching Felgamaker Pipe Organs installed in 1908. They are all in unrestored, playable condition.

The pipe organ at Holy Cross Catholic Church in Santa Cruz, CA is based on an A. B. Felgemaker Co. organ (Opus 506, 1889) with additional pipes and Zimbelstern added by Stuart Goodwin & Co. (Opus 10, 1988) after moving it from its previous home in Ohio. The organ is in active use at the 5:00 Saturday and 7:00 and 8:30 Sunday Masses. An A.B. Felgemaker still exists in working order at the former M.E. Richmond Ave. Church at West Ferry Street & Olmsted Circle and will be cleaned and remain in working order.

A.B. Felgemaker Organ Co. built an organ in 1882 for a Lutheran church in Manitowoc, Wisconsin. After 1905 the organ was moved to St. Cecilia's Catholic Church, Hubbell, Michigan. In 2011 the organ was rebuilt and moved to St. Albert the Great Catholic University Parish, Houghton, Michigan, where it is in regular use for mass, organ instruction, and recitals.

St. Mary Parish in Taylor, Texas founded in 1886, has a rare one of only two-of-its-kind in the state of Texas. In 1902, William Kielihar donated an A. B. Felgemaker Pipe Organ Opus 770 to St. Mary; its value then was $3,600. It's ivory keys, pulls, and stops played full melodic sounds every Sunday, wedding, and funeral until the church was torn down in November 1954. Otto Hoffman, an organ builder from Austin, Texas, disassembled the organ for storage until the new church was built. When the new St. Mary of the Assumption Catholic church was completed in 1955, Hoffman cleaned and re-built the organ in the present church, where it is still used today. Oddly, when the organ was reassembled in the present church, it was placed in a room to the right of the altar instead of upstairs in the balcony. If it had been placed in the balcony, the acoustics of the current church would make the organ's music even more heavenly. In 2020, St. Mary of the Assumption reviewed renovation options to relocate the historic organ to the balcony.

All Souls Unitarian Universalist Church of Bellville, Ohio is home to a historic organ that dates back to 1873. Originally crafted by the A. B. Felgemaker Organ Company in Erie, Pennsylvania, the organ was initially installed in a church in Pennsylvania before making its way to Bellville in 1910. The organ's journey involved transport via Lake Erie to Port Clinton and then by wagon to its new home at All Souls. The organ served the congregation faithfully for many years before undergoing a comprehensive renovation to restore it to its original splendor. Thanks to a dedicated fundraising effort that included rummage sales, concerts, memorial gifts, and a pledge drive, the church successfully raised $30,000 to fund the restoration. The James Leek Organ Company in Oberlin, Ohio, was selected to handle the intricate restoration process, which began in January 2001. This included replacing worn leather components, thoroughly cleaning the instrument, and restoring the hand pump mechanism, which had been inactive since 1935 when an electric blower was installed. In addition, a dedicated church member painstakingly repainted the intricately decorated front pipes. By the first Sunday of June 2002, the organ was fully reassembled and once again ready to fill the church with its beautiful music. To maintain its optimal performance, the organ is tuned annually. The historic organ at All Souls features 396 pipes and includes stops such as the Open Diapason 8', Melodia 8', Dulciana 8', Octave 4', Flute D'Amour 4', Fifteenth 2', Bourdon 16', and a Manual to Pedal Coupler. This remarkable instrument continues to be a cornerstone of the church's rich musical legacy.
