= Zion Lutheran Church (Appleton, Wisconsin) =

Historic church in Wisconsin, United States

- U.S. National Register of Historic Places
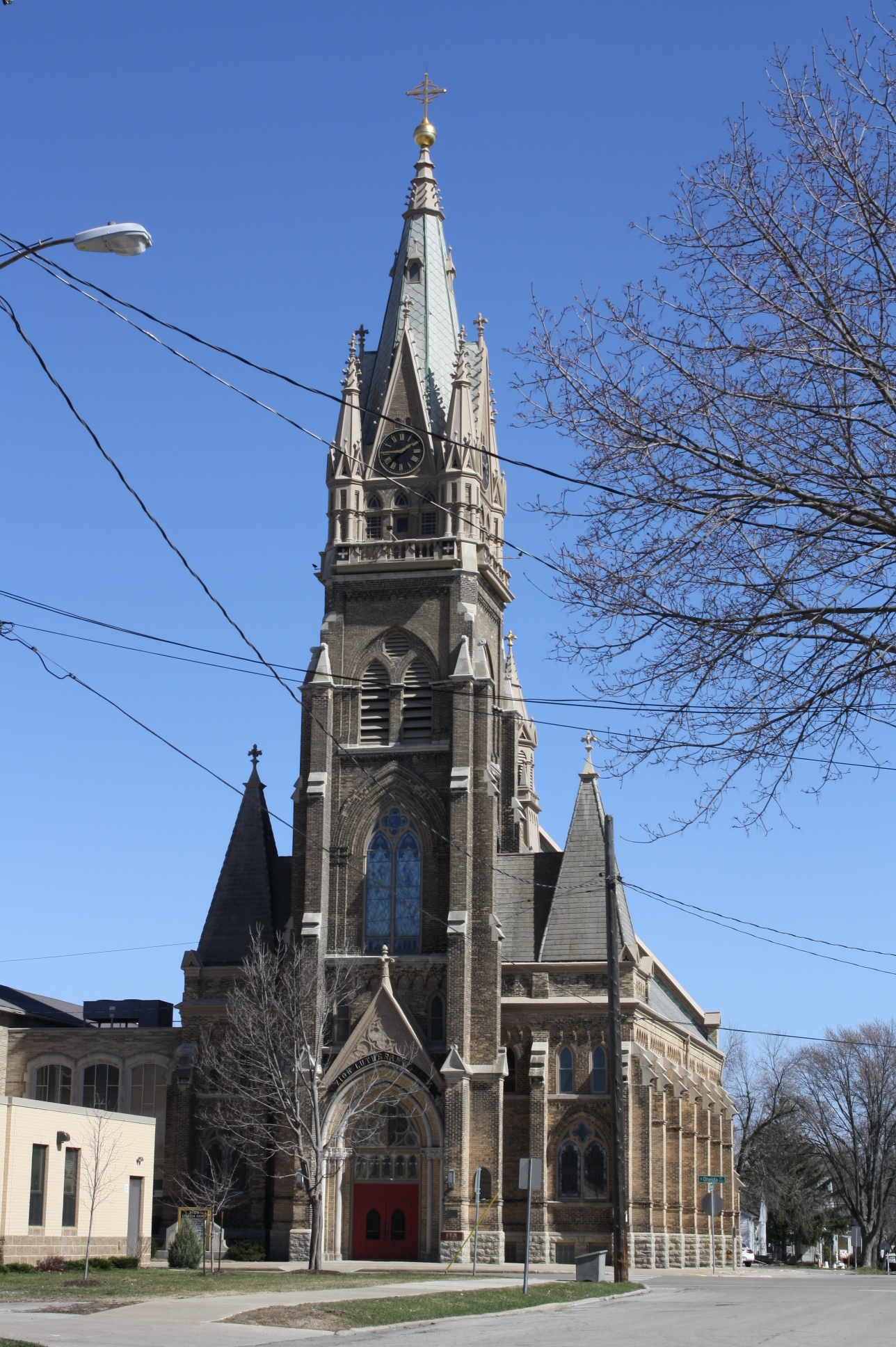
- Zion Lutheran Church
- Location: 912 N. Oneida St. Appleton, Wisconsin
- Coordinates: 44.26981°N 88.40565°W
- Built: 1902
- Architectural style: Victorian Gothic
- NRHP reference No.: 86001309
- Added to NRHP: June 13, 1986

Zion Lutheran Church is a church in Appleton, Wisconsin affiliated with the Evangelical Lutheran Church in America. It was added to the National Register of Historic Places in 1986 for its architectural significance.
