= Tellers Organ Company =

Pipe organ manufacturer in Pennsylvania, United States

Tellers Organ Company logo

Tellers Organ Company was a manufacturer of pipe organs in Erie, Pennsylvania. From 1906 to 1973, the company produced over 1,100 organs throughout the United States and Puerto Rico.

== History ==
The company was founded by two brothers, Henry and Ignatius Tellers, and William Sommerhof. Prior to this, the two Tellers brothers worked at Milwaukee, Wisconsin based Schuelke Organ Company until 1892. They moved to Erie and went to work for the Felgemaker Organ Company for the next 14 years, where they met Sommerhof.

In 1906, the three men established Tellers Organ Company. In 1911, the company changed its name to Tellers-Sommerhof Organ Company. Sommerhof would sell his interest in the company to A. E. Kent, another former Felgemaker employee, in 1918. The company's name was then changed to Tellers-Kent Organ Company. Felgemaker also ceased operations that year. Tellers-Kent assumed all the open contracts and service agreement work from Felgemaker. The company was known as Tellers-Kent for a number of years until the name changed back to Tellers Organ Company.

The company would eventually become a pioneer in the combination pipe/electronic organ fields and would come to produce the Conn-Tellers Electro-Pipe Combination Organ. The company later became an authorized Rodgers Instruments dealer.

Lawrence Phelps purchased the Tellers factory in 1973 and established the Lawrence Phelps & Associates organ building firm. Phelps would produce organs in Erie until the company went out of business in 1981.

== Places that have installed Tellers' organs ==
- St. Alban's Episcopal Chapel, Salisbury, Maryland, installed 1969
- St. John's United Church of Christ, Jonestown, Pennsylvania, installed 1961
- Ninth Street Christian Church, Logansport, Indiana, installed 1952
- St. Boniface Church, Rochester, New York, installed 1961
- St. Paul Lutheran Church, Millington, Michigan, purchased 1965
- St. Patrick Church, Jaffrey, New Hampshire, purchased/installed 1930. Opus 549 9 ranks, 2 manuals
- Temple Society Of Concord, Syracuse, New York. Opus 993 installed 1965
- Cathedral Church of Saint Luke, Orlando, Florida. 88-rank electro-pneumatic organ installed pre-1974, restored 1999
- Saint Leo Oratory, Columbus, Ohio, 1927, 2,700 pipes, restored 2009.
