= Trinity Evangelical Lutheran Church =

Historic church in Wisconsin, United States

- U.S. National Register of Historic Places
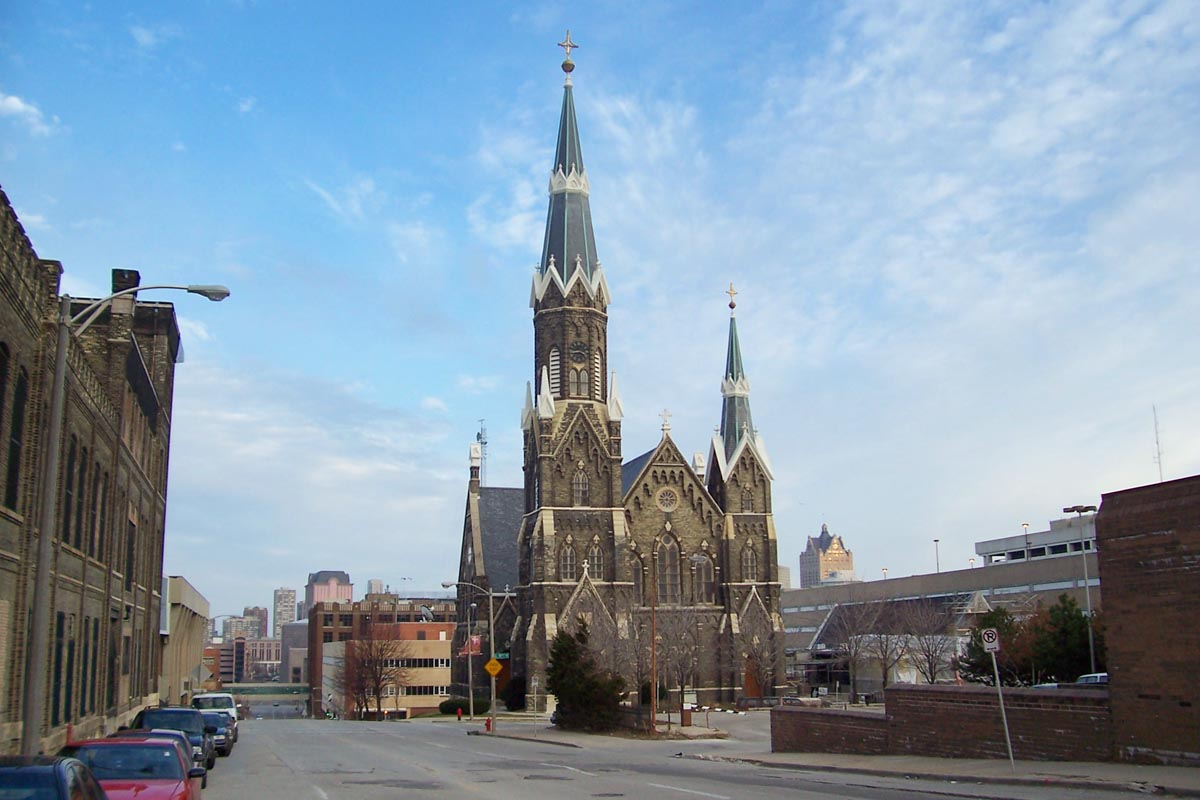
- Trinity Evangelical Lutheran Church

- Location within Wisconsin Location within the United States
- Location: 1046 N. 9th St. Milwaukee, Wisconsin
- Coordinates: 43°2′39″N 87°55′21″W
- Built: 1878
- Architect: Frederick Velguth
- Architectural style: Gothic
- NRHP reference No.: 79000099
- Added to NRHP: May 8, 1979

Trinity Evangelical Lutheran Church is a Victorian Gothic-style Lutheran church built in Milwaukee, Wisconsin in 1878 - then claimed to be "the finest church edifice within the Missouri Synod." Today it is listed on the National Register of Historic Places and is a designated State Historic Site. The building was also declared a Milwaukee Landmark in 1967, and today is the oldest church associated with the Lutheran Church–Missouri Synod in the city.

== Description ==
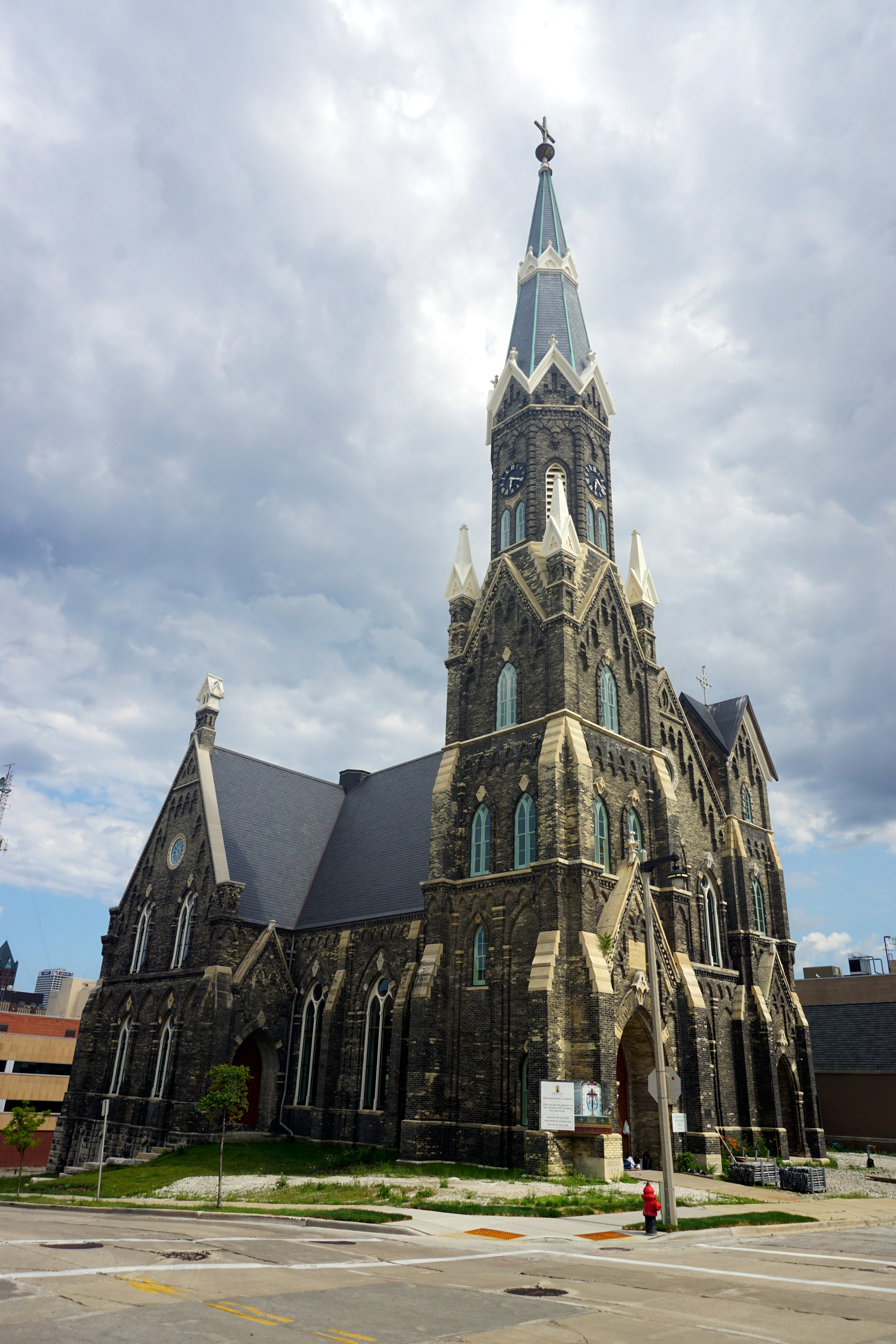
Trinity Evangelical Lutheran Church in 2023

Trinity's congregation was founded by German immigrants from Pomerania who began to arrive in Milwaukee in the late 1830s, looking for freedom to practice their traditional Lutheranism without the interference of the Prussian state. They initially followed a pastor from the Buffalo Synod (chiefly fellow Prussian immigrants), but a controversy in 1847 triggered the formation of Trinity congregation, which requested a pastor from the Missouri Synod, also with German roots and language. The Missouri Synod sent E.G.W. Keyl. He set up Trinity's parish structure and established admission policies that were a key factor in the dispute that produced the Wisconsin Synod. Members of the Trinity Church established St. Stephen Lutheran Church in 1853, in order to serve parishioners south of the Menomonee River. These two churches, along with members of St. John's Evangelical Lutheran Church, helped to seed a number of other Lutheran churches in the area.

Trinity's first building was on 4th Street between Wells and Kilbourn starting in 1847. In 1851 they built a larger frame church at 4th and Wells. In 1869 they moved that church to the site of the current church and built a school. Concordia College began in the school in 1881.

By 1878 the congregation needed a larger building. Architect Frederick Velguth designed the building in a combination of High Victorian Gothic with German Gothic styles, with its hallmark the emphasis on vertical, with towers, spires, and lancet windows all pointing toward heaven. Exterior walls are clad in Cream City brick, a distinct light colored brick manufactured locally, along with sandstone details on the façade. The cruciform structure is 145 feet (44 m) long, 89 feet (27 m) wide, and 54 feet (16 m) tall, with an apse on the east end. It features three towers, the tallest of which is a landmark 200-foot (61 m) spire. Notable of the church's interior is the historic Schuelke organ in the rear gallery, containing some 1,600 pipes. The total cost was $43,500, of which $3,500 was for the organ. The goblet-shaped pulpit is the highlight of the craftsmanship exhibited in the carved woodwork, which was produced by the Wollaeger Brothers woodworking company

German architecture of this type is typical of the historic structures found in and around downtown Milwaukee, including parts of the neighboring Pabst Brewery complex.

Construction of a new church office building and conference center began in September 2005, after the old office (the former parsonage) was razed the previous year. This addition to the grounds was completed in 2006.

== 2018 fire ==
On May 15, 2018, the church caught on fire while construction work was going on, spurring a four-alarm response from the Milwaukee Fire Department and causing $17 million worth of damage to the structure, including the collapse of the entire roof and the shorter southern steeple. No one was injured, but the damage was so catastrophic that it was initially unclear whether the structure was structurally sound to rebuild; an investigation concluded that there was "no structural damage to the brick at all" and rebuilding commenced. The church's 1879 Schuelke pipe organ, which is listed as a "historic organ" by the Organ Historical Society, sustained "extensive" damage. Worship was held at the Krause Funeral Home chapel during repairs.
