= New Vienna, Iowa =

- City
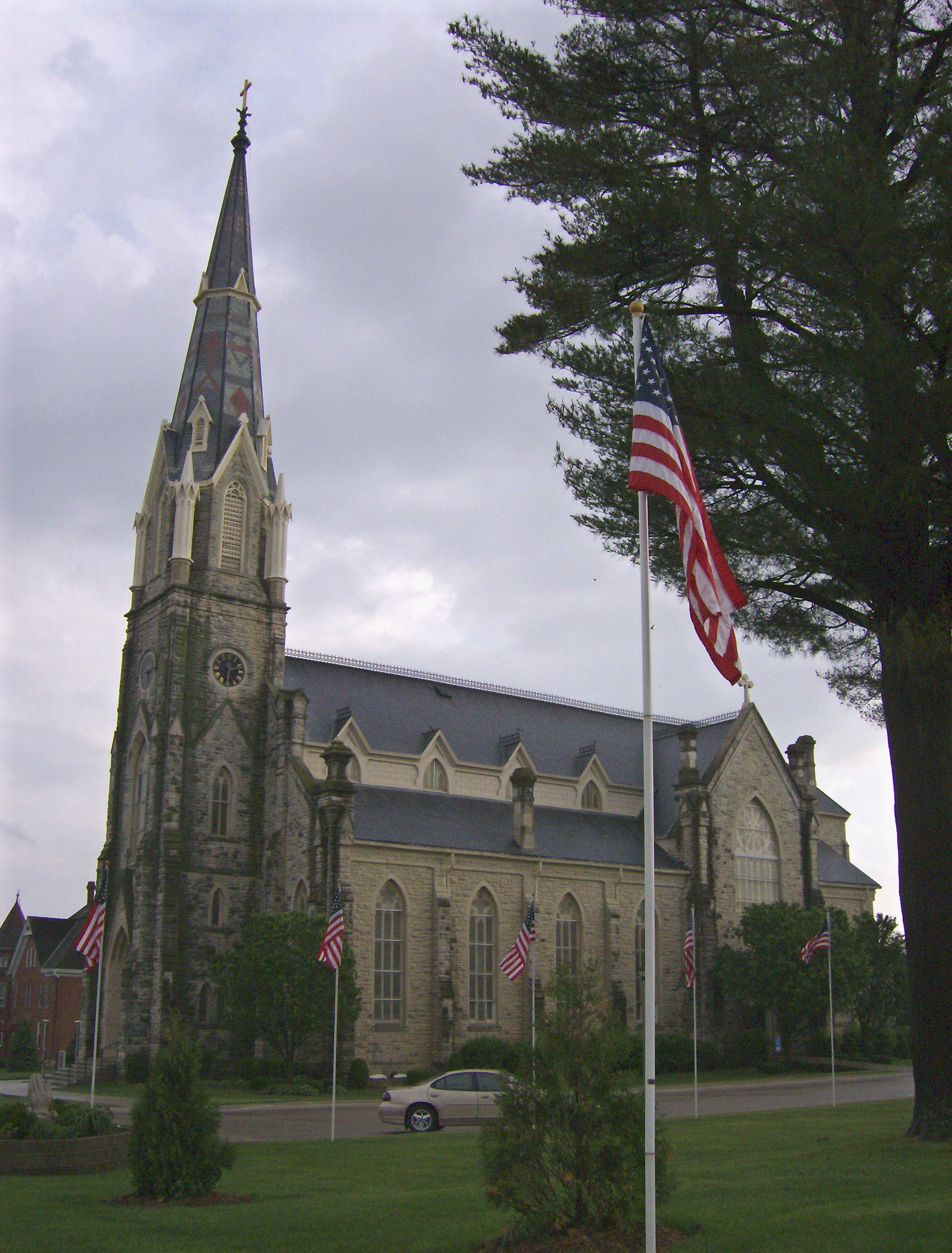
- St. Boniface
- Motto: The eNVy of Iowa
- Location of New Vienna, Iowa
- Coordinates: 42°32′52″N 91°06′50″W
- Country: United States
- State: Iowa
- County: Dubuque

Area
  - Total: 0.47 sq mi (1.21 km^{2})
  - Land: 0.47 sq mi (1.21 km^{2})
  - Water: 0 sq mi (0.00 km^{2})
- Elevation: 1,004 ft (306 m)

Population (2020)
  - Total: 382
  - Density: 819.6/sq mi (316.46/km^{2})
- Time zone: UTC-6 (Central (CST))
  - Summer (DST): UTC-5 (CDT)
- ZIP code: 52065
- Area code: 563
- FIPS code: 19-56550
- GNIS feature ID: 2395218
- Website: newviennaiowa.com

New Vienna is a city in Dubuque County, Iowa, United States. It is part of the Dubuque, Iowa Metropolitan Statistical Area. The population was 382 at the time of the 2020 census, down from 400 in 2000. New Vienna is the home to the Saint Boniface Catholic Church. The city promotes itself with the slogan The eNVy of Iowa.

== Geography ==
According to the United States Census Bureau, the city has a total area of 0.44 square miles (1.14 km^{2}), all land.

== History ==
New Vienna was settled by Germans with assistance from the Emperor of Austria. It was founded in 1843.

St. Boniface Catholic Church was established for the local families that established New Vienna. This church is notable for its late 19th-century William Schuelke pipe organ, one of the few original remaining Schuelke Organs. Except for an electric blower, it has been basically unaltered since installation.

== Demographics ==
Historical populations
| Year | Pop. | ±% |
|---|---|---|
| 1900 | 245 | — |
| 1910 | 188 | −23.3% |
| 1920 | 241 | +28.2% |
| 1930 | 229 | −5.0% |
| 1940 | 229 | +0.0% |
| 1950 | 204 | −10.9% |
| 1960 | 265 | +29.9% |
| 1970 | 392 | +47.9% |
| 1980 | 430 | +9.7% |
| 1990 | 376 | −12.6% |
| 2000 | 400 | +6.4% |
| 2010 | 407 | +1.8% |
| 2020 | 382 | −6.1% |
Source:"U.S. Census website". United States Census Bureau. and Iowa Data Center; Source: U.S. Decennial Census

=== 2020 census ===
As of the census of 2020, there were 382 people, 168 households, and 115 families residing in the city. The population density was 819.6 inhabitants per square mile (316.5/km^{2}). There were 178 housing units at an average density of 381.9 per square mile (147.5/km^{2}). The racial makeup of the city was 97.1% White, 1.3% Black or African American, 0.0% Native American, 0.0% Asian, 0.0% Pacific Islander, 1.3% from other races and 0.3% from two or more races. Hispanic or Latino persons of any race comprised 1.3% of the population.

Of the 168 households, 26.8% of which had children under the age of 18 living with them, 60.7% were married couples living together, 3.0% were cohabitating couples, 20.2% had a female householder with no spouse or partner present and 16.1% had a male householder with no spouse or partner present. 31.5% of all households were non-families. 27.4% of all households were made up of individuals, 12.5% had someone living alone who was 65 years old or older.

The median age in the city was 44.7 years. 20.7% of the residents were under the age of 20; 5.8% were between the ages of 20 and 24; 24.1% were from 25 and 44; 27.5% were from 45 and 64; and 22.0% were 65 years of age or older. The gender makeup of the city was 50.0% male and 50.0% female.

=== 2010 census ===
As of the census of 2010, there were 407 people, 173 households, and 118 families residing in the city. The population density was 925 inhabitants per square mile (357.1/km^{2}). There were 180 housing units at an average density of 409.1 per square mile (158.0/km^{2}). The racial makeup of the city was 98.8% White, 0.2% African American, 0.7% Asian, and 0.2% from two or more races. Hispanic or Latino of any race were 0.2% of the population.

There were 173 households, of which 29.5% had children under the age of 18 living with them, 59.5% were married couples living together, 6.4% had a female householder with no husband present, 2.3% had a male householder with no wife present, and 31.8% were non-families. 30.1% of all households were made up of individuals, and 16.1% had someone living alone who was 65 years of age or older. The average household size was 2.35 and the average family size was 2.93.

The median age in the city was 41.8 years. 23.8% of residents were under the age of 18; 5.4% were between the ages of 18 and 24; 25.8% were from 25 to 44; 25.5% were from 45 to 64; and 19.4% were 65 years of age or older. The gender makeup of the city was 50.4% male and 49.6% female.

=== 2000 census ===
As of the census of 2000, there were 400 people, 167 households, and 122 families residing in the city. The population density was 889.1 inhabitants per square mile (343.3/km^{2}). There were 176 housing units at an average density of 391.2 per square mile (151.0/km^{2}). The racial makeup of the city was 100.00% White. Hispanic or Latino of any race were 0.25% of the population.

There were 167 households, out of which 27.5% had children under the age of 18 living with them, 60.5% were married couples living together, 7.8% had a female householder with no husband present, and 26.9% were non-families. 25.7% of all households were made up of individuals, and 15.6% had someone living alone who was 65 years of age or older. The average household size was 2.40 and the average family size was 2.88.

21.8% are under the age of 18, 8.3% from 18 to 24, 25.3% from 25 to 44, 21.5% from 45 to 64, and 23.3% who were 65 years of age or older. The median age was 40 years. For every 100 females, there were 99.0 males. For every 100 females age 18 and over, there were 98.1 males.

The median income for a household in the city was $36,500, and the median income for a family was $46,875. Males had a median income of $31,375 versus $23,125 for females. The per capita income for the city was $25,285. About 7.0% of families and 6.8% of the population were below the poverty line, including 9.5% of those under age 18 and 7.8% of those age 65 or over.

== Education ==
Residents are within the Western Dubuque Community School District. Zoned schools include Drexler Elementary School in Farley, Drexler Middle School in Farley, and Western Dubuque High School in Epworth.

The remaining Catholic grade school in the "Spires of Faith" Catholic church network, which operates Catholic churches in the area, is St. Francis Xavier Catholic School in Dyersville, and the secondary school is Beckman Catholic High School.

The private Catholic primary school Archbishop Hennessy Catholic School previously had a location in New Vienna. The Hennessy School had been formed by the 1987 consolidation of the St. Boniface School in New Vienna and the SS. Peter & Paul School in Petersburg. In 2013 it consolidated into the Petersburg location, and Archbishop Hennessy closed entirely in 2018.

== See also ==
- Saint Boniface Catholic Church
