= Toy museum (disambiguation) =

Toy museum is a museum of toys.

Toy museum may also refer to:

- Arizona Doll & Toy Museum
- Toy Museum (Brussels)
- Historic Toy Museum, Freinsheim
- Hong Kong International Hobby and Toy Museum
- Ilkley Toy Museum
- Istanbul Toy Museum
- İzmir Toy Museum
- Toy Museum (Melaka)
- Mechelen Toy Museum
- National Transport & Toy Museum
- National Farm Toy Museum
- Toy Museum of NY
- Nuremberg Toy Museum
- Ore Mountain Toy Museum
- Penang Toy Museum
- Pollock's Toy Museum
- Saint Petersburg Toy Museum
- Toy Museum, Sant Feliu de Guíxols
- Soltau Toy Museum
- Toy Museum Stockholm
- Tartu Toy Museum
