= Toy museum =

Type of museum with a collection of toys

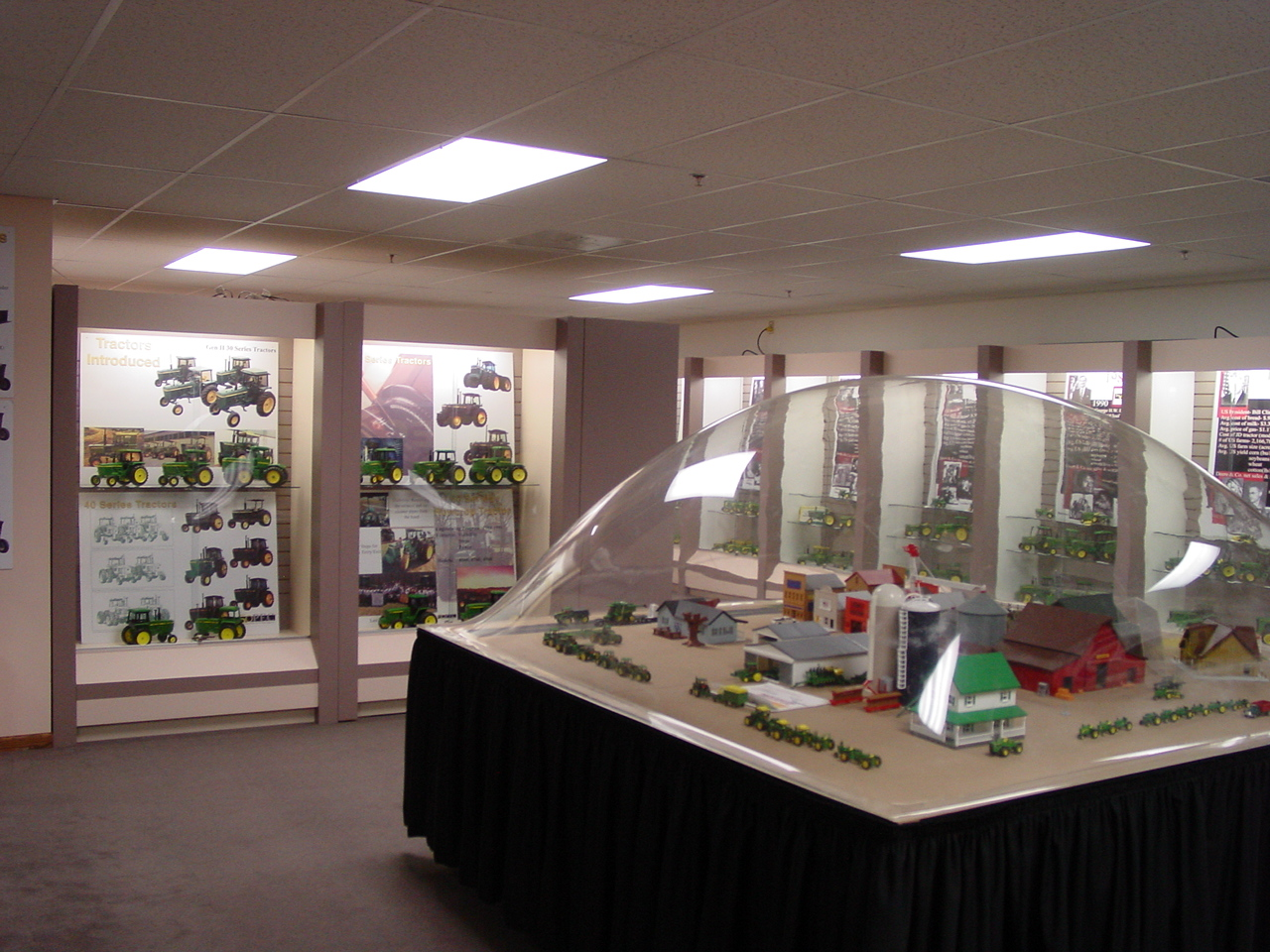
The National Farm Toy Museum in Dyersville, Iowa, United States

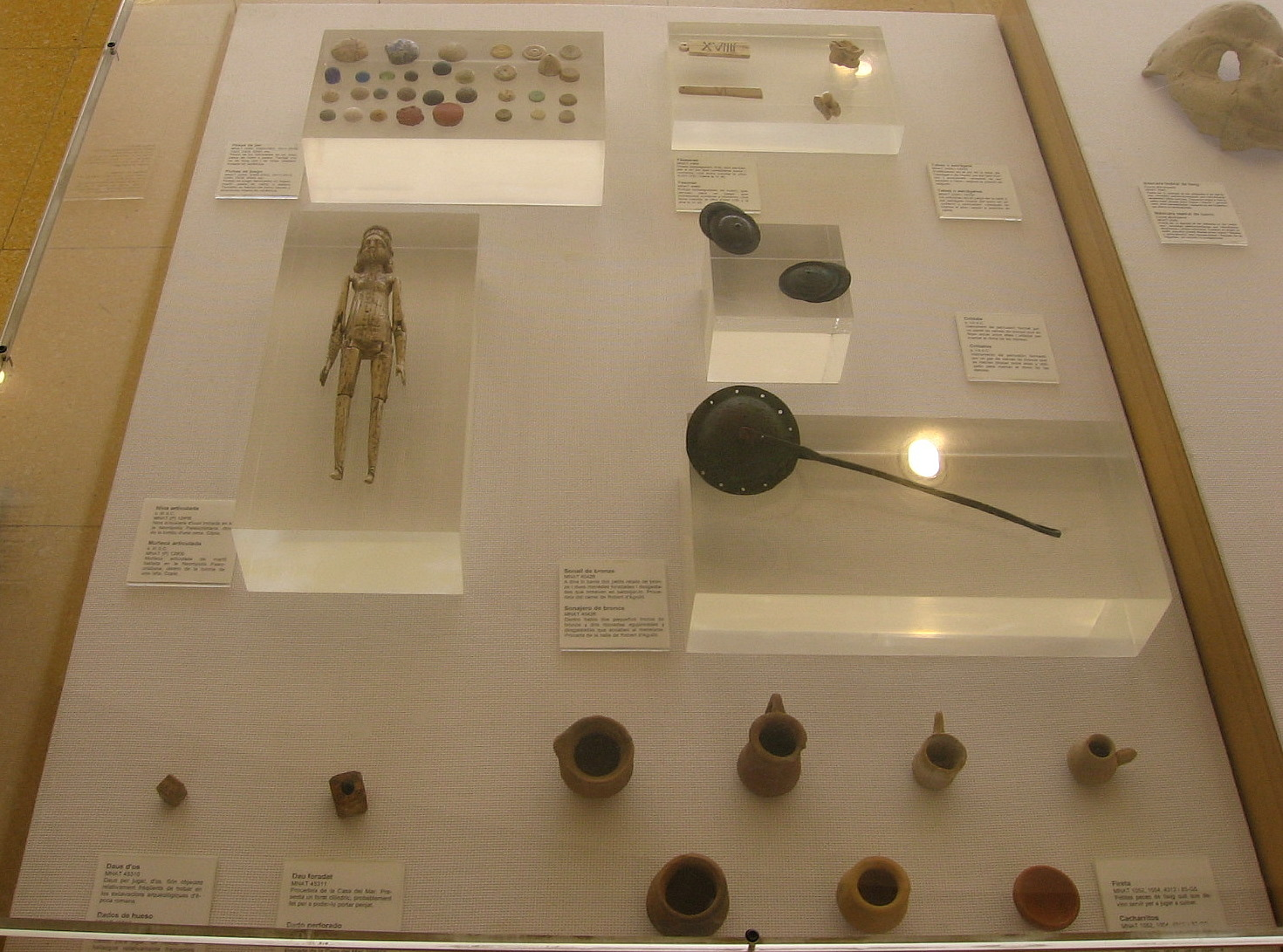
A display of Roman toys at the Museum of Archaeology in Tarragona, Spain

A toy museum is a museum for toys. They typically showcase toys from a particular culture or period with their history. These are distinct from children's museums, which are museums for children, and are often interactive – toy museums may be aimed at children or adults, and may have interactive exhibits or be exclusively for display.

== Notable toy museums ==
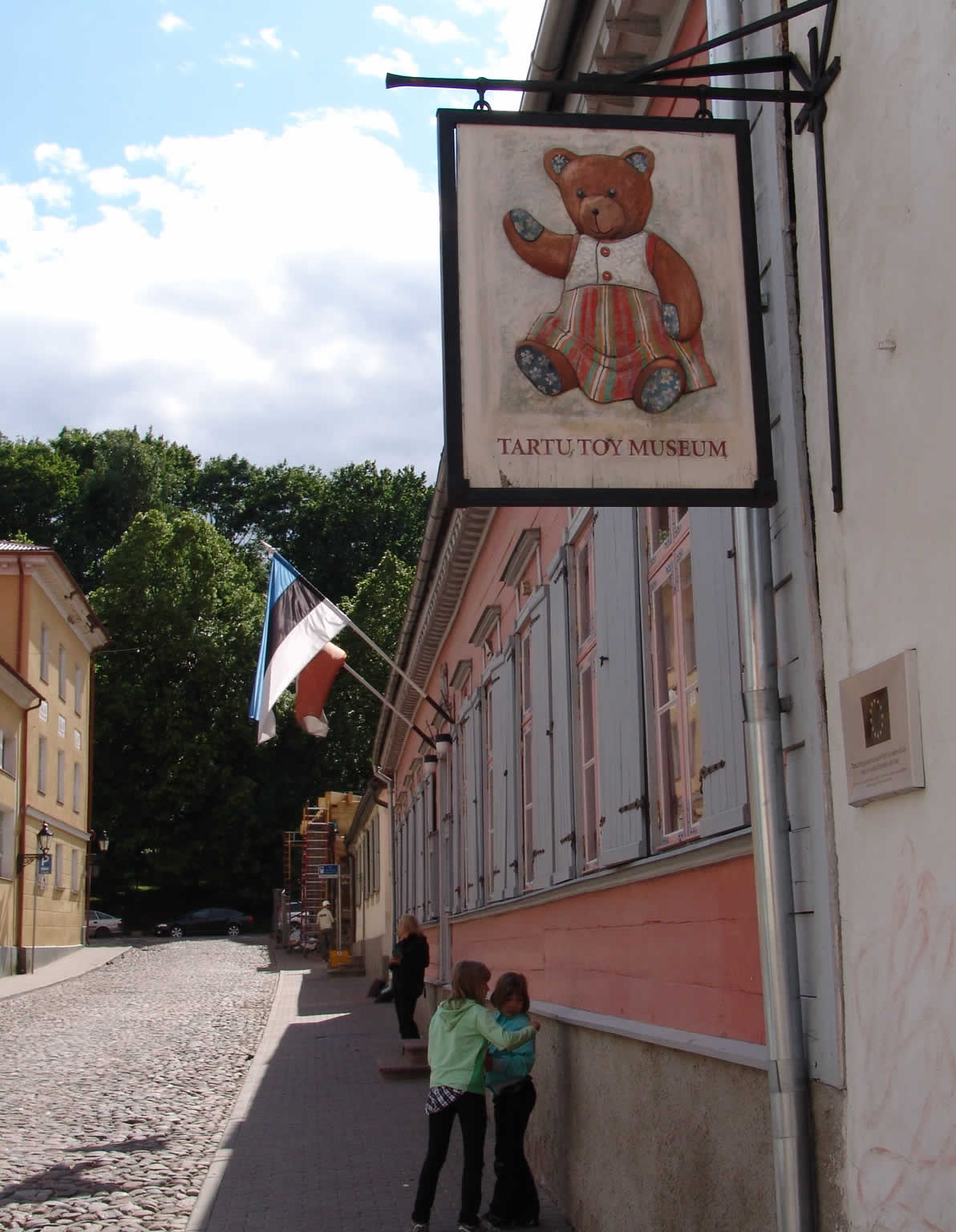
Tartu Toy Museum

The following lists only museums specializing in toys, whose collections are open for public viewing. Some museums such as the American Museum of Natural History have toys on display in their permanent collection, but are not full-fledged toy museums and as such are not listed here. Also, organizations. such as The Doll and Toy "Museum" of New York City that hold toy collections but are not open for public viewing are not listed here.

=== Africa ===
- Toy and Miniature Museum, Stellenbosch, Western Cape, South Africa

=== Americas ===
North

Canada

- National Toy Museum of Canada, Victoria, British Columbia

Mexico

- Antique Toy Museum (Museo del Juguete Antiguo), Mexico City

USA

- The National Farm Toy Museum, a museum located in Dyersville, Iowa that specializes in preserving and displaying scale models, replicas, and toys based on farm equipment.
- The Harold Bell Wright Museum/Toy Museum as known as The World's Largest Toy Museum displayed American toys from the 1800s to 1990s including Star Wars and 1950 Western toys in Branson, Missouri.
- The National Toy and Miniature Museum in Kansas City, Missouri boasts a collection of more than 300,000 items.
- Strong - National Museum of Play - in Rochester, New York, founded in 1982, that documents the history of play in American culture. It includes the National Toy Hall of Fame - a hall of fame for popular toys, opened in 1998.
- Spencer Doll and Toy Museum Spencer, North Carolina
- The Toy and Plastic Brick Museum in Bellaire, Ohio, USA. Founded in 2006.

South

- Museo El Juguetero, Montevideo, Uruguay. https://www.instagram.com/museoeljuguetero_uy/
- The Buenos Aires Toy Museum, Buenos Aires, Argentina.
- Toy Museum, Belo Horizonte, Minas Gerais, Brazil.

=== Asia ===
- MINT Museum of Toys, Singapore was opened in 2007 and remains the largest vintage toys and collectables museum in Asia with an ever-growing collection of 50,000 items, ranging specifically between the years of 1840s to 1980s.
- Hong Kong International Hobby and Toy Museum, China, was opened in 2011. Exhibits include toy cars, dolls, action figures, cartoon characters, science fiction collectibles, model rockets, Japanese anime, classic toys and more.
- Shankar's International Dolls Museum, a large collection of dolls in Delhi, India, opened in 1965.
- The Toy Museum of Ahmedabad, in Ahmedabad, INDIA World heritage city toy museum by Raheel Patel Toy Museum
- Penang Toy Museum in Penang, Malaysia displays more than 120,000 items of figures, dolls and 60 life size figures. It is the largest collection of toys in the world. It was founded in 2002 by a professional engineer.
- Malacca Toy Museum in Malacca, Malaysia.
- Japan Spinning Top Museum, Nagoya, Aichi
- Karuzawa Erz Toy Museum (エルツおもちゃ博物館・軽井沢), Karuizawa, Nagano, a sister museum of the Ore Mountain Toy Museum, Seiffen, Germany
- Tokyo Toy Museum (東京おもちゃ美術館), Tokyo, Japan
- Yokohama Doll Museum (横浜人形の家), Yokohama, Japan
- The Istanbul Toy Museum - a small museum founded in 2005, and located in the Göztepe district of Istanbul, Turkey.

=== Europe ===
Eastern

- The Tartu Toy Museum in Tartu, Estonia. Was opened in 1994 and now holds more than 20,000 items.
- The Vilnius Toy Museum in Vilnius, Lithuania, presents the history of Lithuanian toys. The space of the museum is divided into an archeological space, containing the oldest toys, an ethnographic space, showcasing 19th-20th century toys, and a third space introducing more modern toys.
- The Saint Petersburg Toy Museum - a non-state cultural establishment, Russia. Founded in 1997.
- The State Museum of Toys (Kyiv), Kyiv, Ukraine

Western

- The Mechelen Toy Museum in the Nekkerspoel hamlet of Mechelen, Belgium. Founded in 1982 and officialized in 1998.
- The Musée du jouet, in Poissy, France.
- The Suomenlinna Toy Museum, est. 1985, located in Suomenlinna Sea Fortress, Finland.
- The Nuremberg Toy Museum - a toy museum in Nuremberg, Germany. Founded in 1971.
- The Ore Mountain Toy Museum, Seiffen, in Germany is an internationally known toy museum with a collection of unique wooden toys typical of the Ore Mountains region.
- The Benaki Toy Museum, in Athens, Greece.
- Rhodes Toy Museum, the first toy museum in Greece with exclusive Greek toys.
- The Museo Valenciano del Juguete de Ibi (Alicante) Spain. Founded in 1986. Toys of XIX and XX centuries.
- The Museo Etnográfico del Soldadito Antiguo Spain. Founded in 2021. Tin and Plastic Toys of XX century.
- The Museu del Joguet de Catalunya (Girona) Spain. Opened in 1970. Regional toys.
- The Museo de los Soldaditos de Plomo (Valencia) Spain. Set in a historic palace. Tin soldiers..
- The Tidö Toy Museum, in Västerås, Sweden.
- The Swiss Museum of Games, in La Tour-de-Peilz, Switzerland.
- Pollock's Toy Museum - a small museum in Covent Garden, London, UK, first opened in 1956.
- The Museum of Childhood (Edinburgh), on the Royal Mile, in Edinburgh, Scotland.
- The Brighton Toy and Model Museum, in Brighton, Sussex, England, has an extensive collection of toy and model trains, as well as many other toys, dolls, and construction toys, such as Meccano.

=== Oceania ===
New Zealand

- National Transport & Toy Museum

== Former museums ==
- The Bear Museum, a teddy bear museum, founded in Petersfield, Hampshire in 1984. Closed in 2006.
- The Teddy Bear Museum of Naples, a teddy bear museum, which opened in 1990 in north Naples, Florida, and closed in 2005.
- The Toy Town Museum is located in East Aurora, New York, the home of Fisher-Price. It was located on the Fisher-Price campus although it operated as an independent entity. It is currently looking for a new location.
- The London Toy and Model Museum opened in 1982, in London, UK, and closed in 1999.
