= Top Fast-Food Toy Collections Museum =

Museum in Alor Setar, Malaysia

- Established: 2021
- Location: Lokasi 2521 Pekan Pumpong, Alor Setar, Kedah, Malaysia
- Coordinates: 6°09′15″N 100°22′08″E
- Type: Toy museum
- Collection size: c. 80,000 items
- Founder: Lee Choon Chiek

The Top Fast-Food Toy Collections Museum is a private toy museum in Alor Setar, Malaysia, dedicated to the collection and display of memorabilia from McDonald's, including primarily Happy Meal toys but also employee uniforms, signs, menus, packaging, and other items. As of 2025, the museum contained over 80,000 items.

== History ==
Lee Choon Chiek was introduced to collecting in 1978, when he was 17 years old and his friends discussed their collections. Lee attended the 1982 ceremonial opening of Malaysia's first McDonald's restaurant in Kuala Lumpur and received a commemorative metal pencil holder, which inspired him to begin collecting fast food memorabilia. He expanded his collection with some items from KFC until 1990, when a McDonald's location opened in Alor Setar, at which point he focused his collection on McDonald's memorabilia. Lee began to buy Happy Meal toys from Malaysia and from abroad, and his friends and family helped him acquire foreign items when they traveled to other countries.

In 2021, Lee's son Jian Wen had the idea to turn the collection into a museum. The museum went viral on social media in 2022, increasing visits. Since 2022, the museum has been the site of school field trips and busloads of tourists often stop by on their way to Thailand. Lee has received offers to purchase his collection, but he has declined them, as he says that the collection is more for his own pleasure than for financial investment. He has stated that he has no interest in appraising the collection.

The collection has over 80,000 items. Over 40,000 items remain in storage and are not displayed because Lee has a policy of only displaying toys when he has the complete set. Notable items in the collection include a set of plushies from 1999 depicting Hello Kitty and Dear Daniel in traditional wedding clothes from different cultures, an unused uniform and paper hat from the first McDonald's in the U.S., uniforms from the first McDonald's in Malaysia, mascot costumes, and a collection of exclusive condiment packets from locations around the world. Also included are menus, promotional boards, posters, and limited-edition packaging from promotional food items.
