= Toy Museum Stockholm =

Museum in Stockholm, Sweden

Toy Museum
- Leksaksmuseet
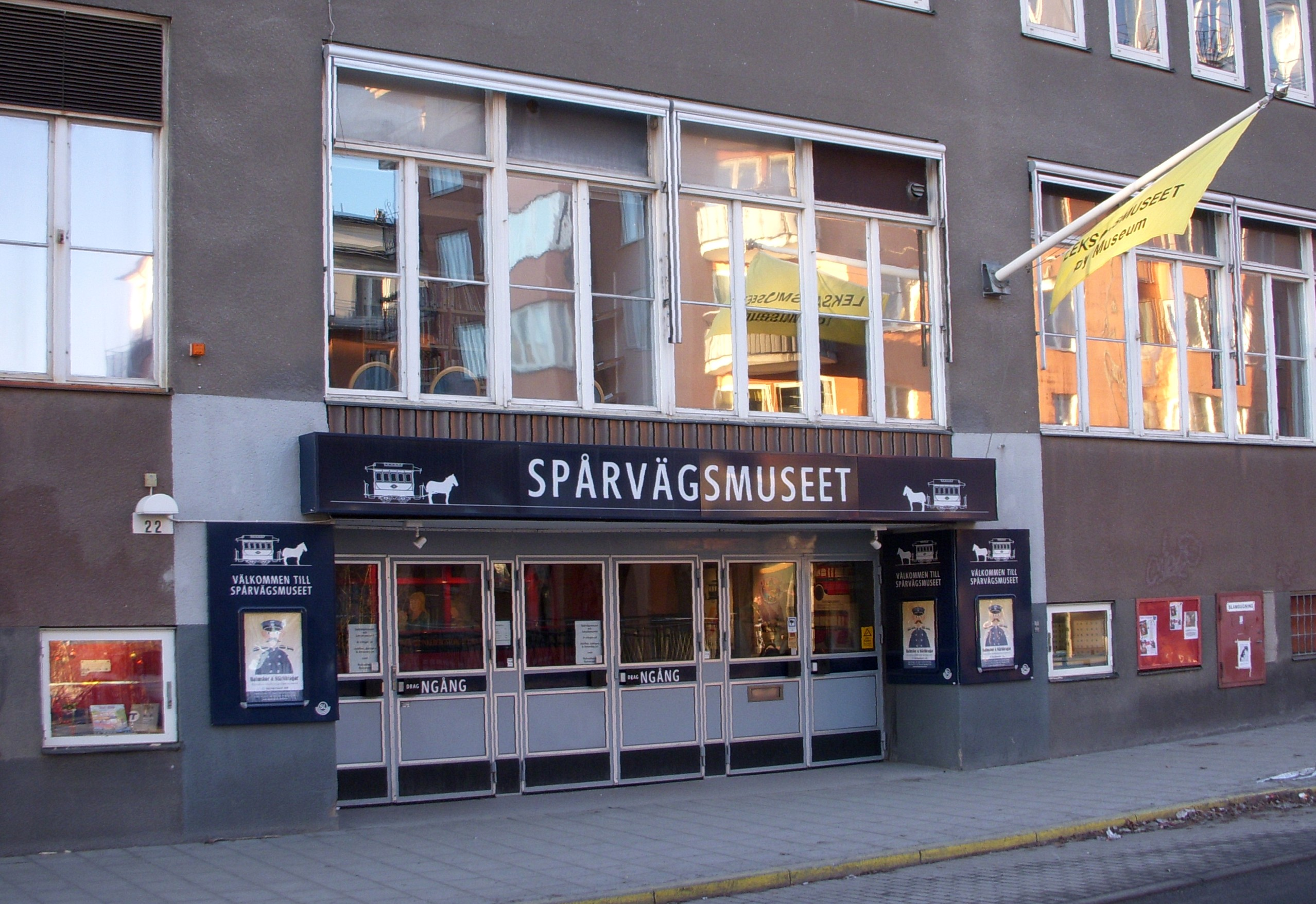
- The entrance of Leksaksmuseet and Spårvägsmuseet.
- Established: 30 August 1980
- Location: Södermalm, Stockholm
- Coordinates: 59°18′42″N 18°05′55″E

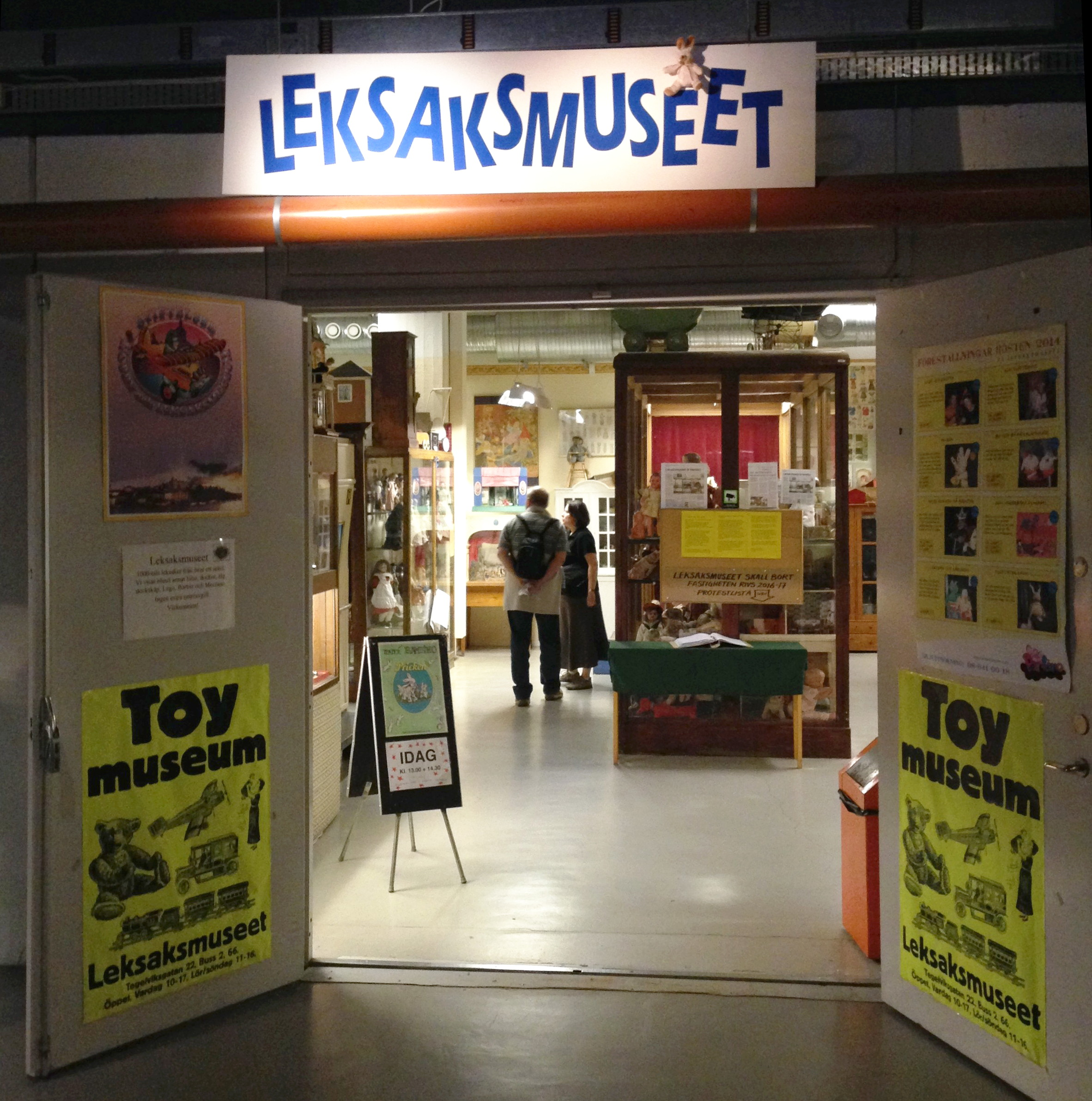
Interior entrance to Leksaksmuseet

The Toy Museum (Swedish: Leksaksmuseet) is a toy museum located (since 2005) in Spårvägsmuseet in Södermalm, Stockholm. It was originally located at Mariatorget, where it first opened on August 30, 1980. One notable attraction is the railway modelling collection of the Railway Society (Järnvägssällskapet). The focus is on "the 20th century, with emphasis on technical toys". Now Leksaksmuseet is located in Nacka at Saltsjö-Pir in brand new premises.
