= Burik =

Burik or Burick is a surname of Ukrainian origin. Notable people with the surname include:

- Jason Burik, American Lego artist
- Dick van Burik (born 1973), retired Dutch footballer
- Si Burick (1909–1986), sports editor

It can also refer to:

- Burik, Philippine tattoos of the Ilocano people
