= Puzzle Mansion =

- Museum logo

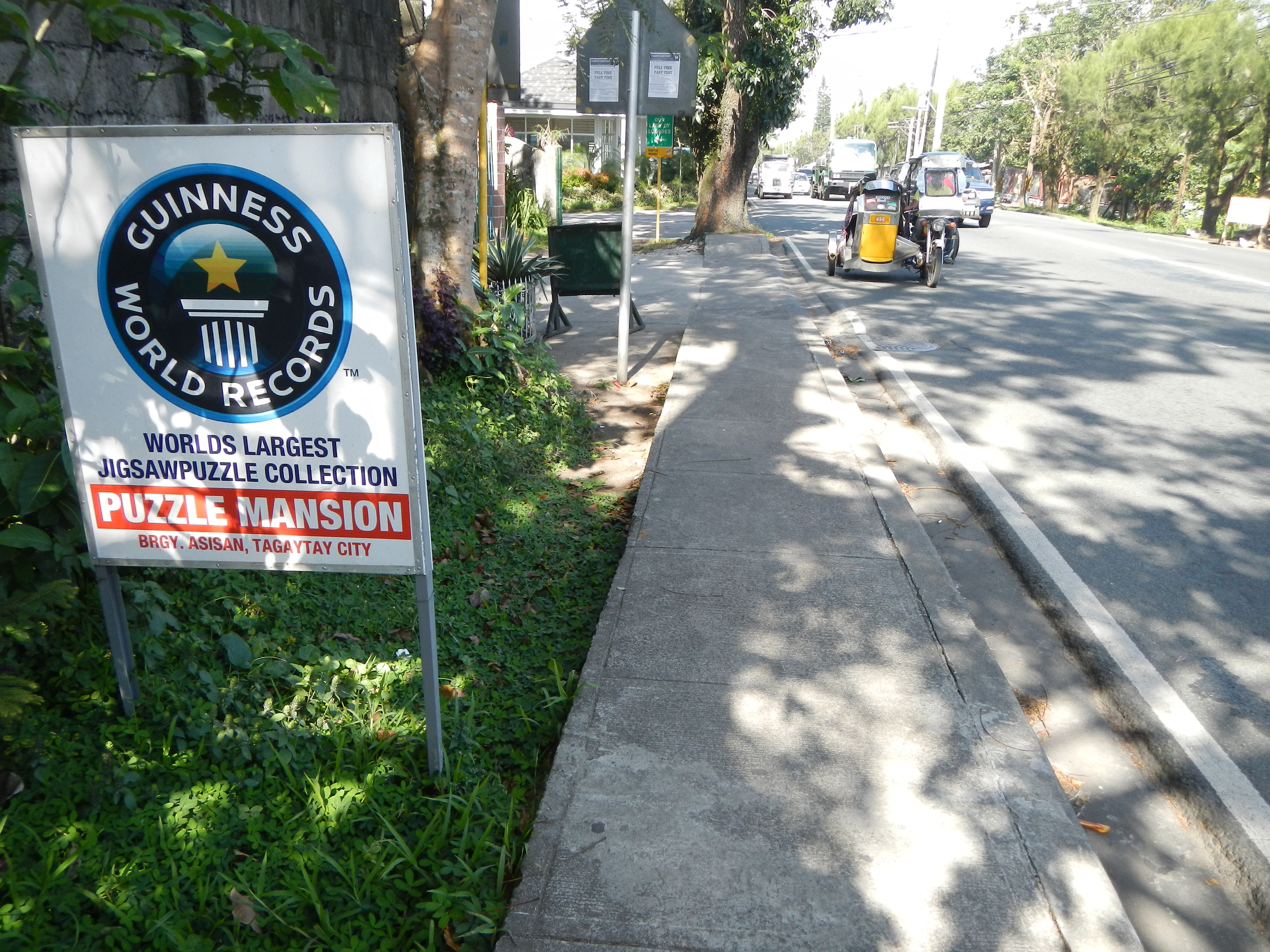
- Signage of the Puzzle Mansion
- Established: 2012
- Location: Tagaytay, Cavite, Philippines
- Coordinates: 14°5′52″N 120°54′15″E
- Type: Toy museum
- Collections: Jigsaw puzzles
- Collection size: 1,500 (2014)
- Founder: Georgina Gil-Lacuna

The Puzzle Mansion is a museum in Tagaytay, Cavite, Philippines which hosts a collection of jigsaw puzzle which from 2012 to 2017 was recognized to be the biggest in the world according to Guinness.

== History ==
The building occupied by the Puzzle Mansion started as a rest house for the family of puzzle collector, Georgina Gil-Lacuna and also as a private display site for Gil-Lacuna's finished puzzles.

The concept for the museum was first made in 2011 by puzzle collector Georgina Gil-Lacuna and her son Gino Orda who were concerned on where to store the puzzle collection of Gil-Lacuna. They learned through the internet that the biggest recognized collector of puzzles was a woman from Brazil who has over 230 puzzles. Gil-Lacuna at that time had 800 puzzles. On November 19, 2012, she was proclaimed by Guinness to be the new holder of the feat, with 1,030 puzzles finished at the time of the proclamation. The museum opened to the public in 2012. This surpassed the record of Luiza Figueiredo of São Paulo, Brazil.

Aside from a museum the place was also made into a bed-and-breakfast place. In October 2014, it was reported that the museum hosts about 1,500 puzzles. Gil-Lacuna died within the same year due to cardiac arrest. In 2017, Guinness would recognized Figueiredo's collection once again as the largest with 1,047 different jigsaw puzzles.

== Facilities ==
The museum building is situated within a 1 hectare lot.

== Collection ==
The collection of the museum dates back in the 1980s when its founder and puzzle collector Georgina Gil-Lacuna bought a 5,000-pieces Mickey Mouse jigsaw puzzle from Hong Kong for her then 2-year-old son Gino thinking it had only 500 pieces. She will then finish around a thousand puzzles in the next 30 years which will form part of the museum's collection. Puzzles of various materials form the collection such as wood, cardboard and plastic puzzles. In terms of form the museum hosts flat, spherical, 3D and "4D" puzzles. The puzzles in the collection also features various genres and subjects such as people, nature, historical event, religious figures, fictional characters, cartoons, corporate ads, as well as reproduction of paintings by artists such as Pierre-Auguste Renoir, Vincent van Gogh, Michelangelo, Leonardo da Vinci, Salvador Dalí, Claude Monet, Sandro Botticelli, Francisco Goya, Antoni Gaudí, Pablo Picasso, and Edgar Degas.

Among the most difficult to accomplish puzzles for Gil-Lacuna was the 10,000 piece puzzle which featured Diego Velázquez’s Las Hilanderas which took 300 hours over 7 months to finish due to most of the puzzle's pieces being solid black.
