= Sunay Akın =

Turkish poet, writer, TV host, journalist, and a philanthropist (born 1962)

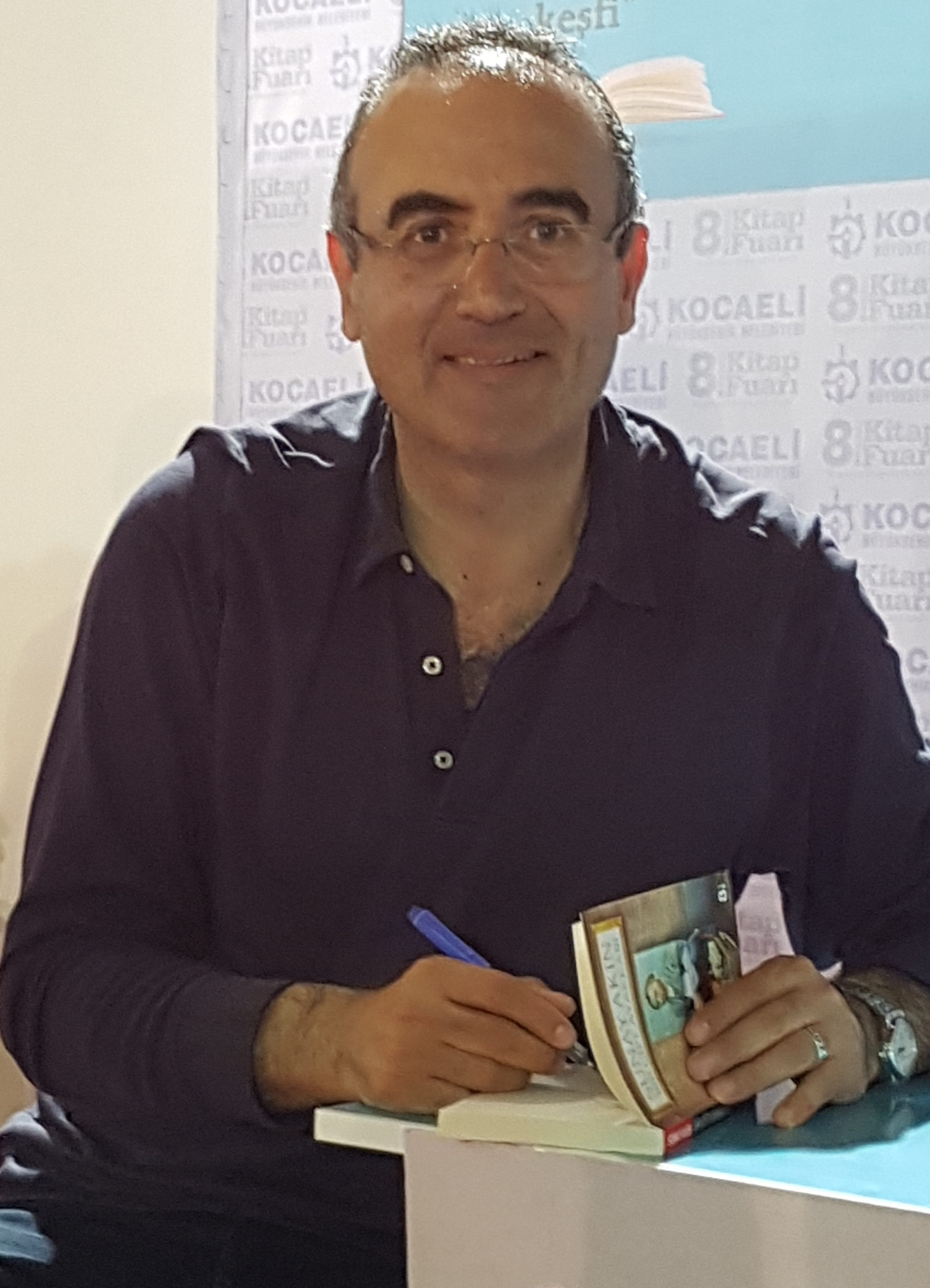
- Born: 12 September 1962 (age 63)
- Occupation: poet, writer, TV host, journalist, philanthropist
- Notable works: Kule Cambazı (Tower Acrobat) Yeni Yaprak (New Page, New Leaf) Olmaz (Won't Happen)

Sunay Akın (born 12 September 1962) is a Turkish poet, writer, TV host, journalist, and a philanthropist. He is the founder of Istanbul Toy Museum.

== Biography ==
Akın was born in Trabzon, Turkey. Akın is best known for his poetry; his primary influences include Orhan Veli Kanık and Cemal Süreya. His poems are generally lyric, short, and soft in tone. He also often makes use of satirical forms and puns.

Akın has a collection of over 7,000 toys, some of which date back nearly 200 years. 4,000 of them are on display in the İstanbul Toy Museum which opened in 2005.

He co-hosts a TV show called "Yaşamdan Dakikalar" ("Minutes from Life") on the TV channel tv8, together with Hıncal Uluç, Haşmet Babaoğlu, and Nebil Özgentürk. He has hosted other TV and radio programmes such as "Mahya Işıkları", "Stüdyo İstanbul" and "İzler" on the TV channel TRT 2, "Gezgin Korkuluk" on the TV channel tv8, and "Veşaire...Veşaire" on the radio channel Yaşam Radyo.

He lectures at Marmara University, and Müjdat Gezen Art School, as well as at his own institution, the İstanbul Toy Museum.

Akın regularly stages one man shows in Turkey and abroad, and participates in panels and conferences. He contributes as a regular columnist to the newspaper Cumhuriyet. His column is named after his 2004 book, "Kule Cambazı" ("Tower Acrobat"), in reference to İstanbul's Maiden's Tower.

== Awards ==
- 1987, Halil Kocagöz Poem Awards for his collection of unprinted poems "Noktalı Virgül" ("Semicolon")
- 1990, Orhon Murat Arıburnu Poem Awards for his poem "Makiler" ("Maquis")

== Works ==
=== Earlier works ===
His first poems were published in various periodicals in 1984. In 1989, he founded the poetry journal "Yeni Yaprak" ("New Page", "New Leaf") in reference to Orhan Veli's landmark 1949 journal "Yaprak", whose logo was adopted in the new publication. "Yeni Yaprak" was published in collaboration with the poets Ramazan Üren and Akgün Akova, twice a week in the beginning, on a monthly basis later, reaching a total of sixteen issues.

In 1990, Akın took part in the publication of "Olmaz" (Won't Happen), a poetry journal. In 1991, in one of Yaprak's last issues, a poem titled "Barış için dizeler" ("Lines for Peace") brought together 81 Turkish poets each writing parts of the verses, unaware of what the others composed. Some among the 81 poets were well-known names of Turkish literature, such as Can Yücel, Hilmi Yavuz, Lale Müldür, Semih Kaplanoğlu, and Süreyya Berfe.

=== Bibliography ===
- "Antik Acılar" (1991, 1995, 1999) ("Antique sufferings")
- "Şairler Matinesi" (1993) ("Poets' matinée")
- "Şiir Cumhuriyeti" (1993) ("The Republic of Poetry") - joint collection
- "Veşaire...Veşaire" (1994), which could be translated as "And to poets...And to poets", a pun derived from "Ve saire...Ve saire" ("Et cetera...Et cetera...")
- "Küçük Asker...Küçük Asker..." (1995) ("Little soldier..Little soldier" referring to a popular Turkish children's song of the same name)
- "Makiler" (1996, 1999) ("Maquis")
- "Kaza Süsü" (1997) ("Freak accident")
- "Kırılan Canlar" (1997) ("Broken Souls")
- "İstanbul'un Nazım Planı" (Structural plan of Istanbul), with the word "Nazım" propitious to a pun since it also means "in verse" or may refer to the poet Nazım Hikmet.
- "62 Tavşanı" (2000) ("Rabbit of 62") in reference to the simple way of drawing a rabbit, by writing down 62 first and then connecting the digits with two horizontal lines. Akın was born in 1962.
- "Ayçöreği ve Denizyıldızı" (2000) ("Croissant and starfish")
- "Kız Kulesi'ndeki Kızılderili" (2000) ("The Indigenous peoples of the Americas|Redskin in Maiden's Tower")
- "Önce Çocuklar ve Kadınlar" (2000) ("Children and women first")
- "İstanbul'da Bir Zürafa" (2001) ("A giraffe in İstanbul")
- "Onlar Hep Oradaydı" (2002) ("They were always there")
- "Kırdığımız Oyuncaklar" (2004) ("The toys we broke")
- "Kule Cambazı" (2004) ("Tower Acrobat")

=== Periodicals ===
His poems were published in many periodicals and anthologies such as Milliyet Sanat, Yeni Düşün, Varlık, Broy, Yarın, Journal of poetry & literature. He also wrote essays in a number of periodicals such as the Cumhuriyet supplement "Gezi" covering subjects such as poetry and history of art.

== See also ==
- İstanbul Toy Museum
