= Oleg Buryan =

Russian artist

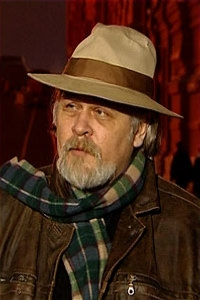
Buryan Oleg

Oleg Yuriyevich Buryan (Russian: Оле́г Ю́рьевич Бурья́н; born 1959, Bila Tserkva, Ukraine) is a Russian artist, who lived in Moscow from the 1980s. In 2012, he moved to St-Petersburg, where he joined the St-Petersburg Union of Artists. He belongs to the first generation of post-Soviet creators, integrated in the international context.

== Biography ==
Before becoming an artist, Buryan studied medicine at the Leningrad Medical Institute, and worked as a lawyer's secretary, a street cleaner, and as a censor for rock lyrics for the Moscow Chief of the Department of Culture.

Buryan received his art education (as tapestry artist) at the Moscow Textile College in the 1980s, and studied video art and independent documentary at Moscow State University from 1994 to 1995 (at Associate Professor Deirdre Boyle)). In 1989, O. Buryan was awarded a VDNKh Silver medal for his contribution to Russian culture, and became the last person to receive such an award in the Soviet period (1985–1991). In his works various elements of archaic, and "ethnic" art are evident.

"Recycled art" is another name for Buryan's art. Some of his sculptures are done as "ready-made" objects and related to the tradition of "Dada" in their absurd humor and strange beauty of animals with human eyes. Buryan's works features versatility in both choice of media and general style, ranging from an oil paintings to an art toys, from a book illustration to a monumental sculpture, from a media art to an installation art, TV and an industrial design. Buryan's works are in the collections of the Bank WestLB (Germany) and the Amer Sports (Finland), the University of Dundee (Scotland), the Kyiv National Museum of Russian Art, (Ukraine), the Saint Petersburg Toy Museum, and the Venice Sculpture park.

== Main shows and projects ==
- 1986–1988: Autumn exhibitions at the Exhibition Hall at the Malaya Gruzinskaya Street, 28, Moscow (Russia)
- 1988–1989: All–Union of Young Artists exhibition at the Central Exhibition Hall in Moscow Manege, Moscow (Russia)
- 1990: WestLB Bank—the International Trade center (Hammer-Center), Moscow (Russia)
- 1991: Performance "Citizens of the Night" at the Edinburgh Festival Theatre, 369 Gallery, Edinburgh (Scotland)
- 1992: "International Incident" – solo show at the French Institute, Edinburgh (Scotland)
- 1993: "Bald Buryans" – solo show at the Gallery "Dar" Contemporary Art Center, Moscow (Russia)
- 1994: Collaboration with Cadogan Guides Publishers. Illustrations for the guide to Moscow and St. Petersburg, written by Rose Baring, London (UK), ISBN 978-1-56440-274-5
- 1994: Foundation "Sirin prints" (postcards) together with W. Shon, Oxford (UK)
- 1995: "Anabasis" at the National Museum of Russian Art, Kyiv (Ukraine)
- 1996: "Serious Games" at the Toy Museum, St. Petersburg (Russia)
- 1998: Solo Show at the Hanns Seidel Foundation, Kyiv (Ukraine) – Munich (Germany)

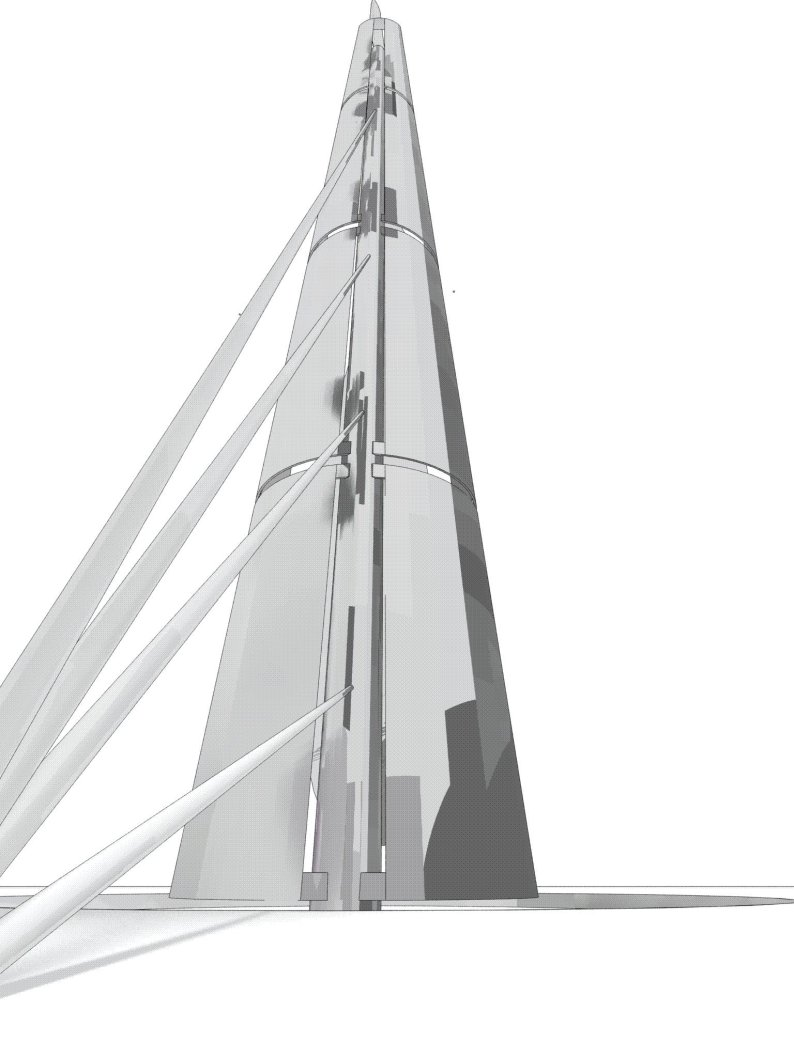
O. Buryan for Concours Européen de Sculptures monumentales at Arcelor Mittal, 2007 (France)

- 2000: Solo show at the Italy–Russia Lombardy Association, Milan (Italy)
- 2001: Collaboration with "Last Hero" ("Survival") TV ORT (artdirector), Panama City (Panama) – Moscow (Russia)
- 2004: “Making Moves” at the Gallery "Six Chapel Row Contemporary Art", Bath (UK)
- 2005: The International Art toys Show at "Haim+Handwerk", Munich (Germany)
- 2005: “Not-naiv-toys done by Buryan” – solo show at the Toy museum, St. Petersburg (Russia)
- 2005: "Recycled Art" – solo show at the Central House of Artist, Moscow (Russia)
- 2005: Six sculptures for the Venice Sculpture park, Venice (Italy)
- 2005: "Art toys in Burg Wildegg" (Austria)
- 2006: Szpilman Award (short list), Berlin (Germany)
- 2007: Concours Européen de Sculpture monumentale (in French) "Art is Steel" at the Arcelor Mittal (short list, catalogue: O. Buryan "The Steel Drop", p.7), Rheims (France)
- 2007: "Something’s Brewing Bier" for International project by Utrecht University (catalogue) Stedelijk Museum, Leiden (the Netherlands)
- 2008: Mural "Grunewald" (300 sq meters), Noginsk (Russia)
- 2008: ArtZept–2008 International Design Award (shortlist), Milan (Italy)
- 2008: Project "Ecoart for Google maps" – the First Kronstadt International Ecological Festival of Arts "KronFest–2008", Kronstadt – St. Petersburg (Russia)
- 2009: International Award of sculpture at the MAXXI - National Museum of the 21st Century Arts, Rome (Italy)
- 2009: Buryans – Family Project "Genogram" for the European Cultural Foundation
- 2009: Show "Dialogue" at the All–Russia Museum of Decorative–Applied and Folk Arts, Moscow (Russia)
