= Mint Museum of Toys =

MINT Museum of Toys
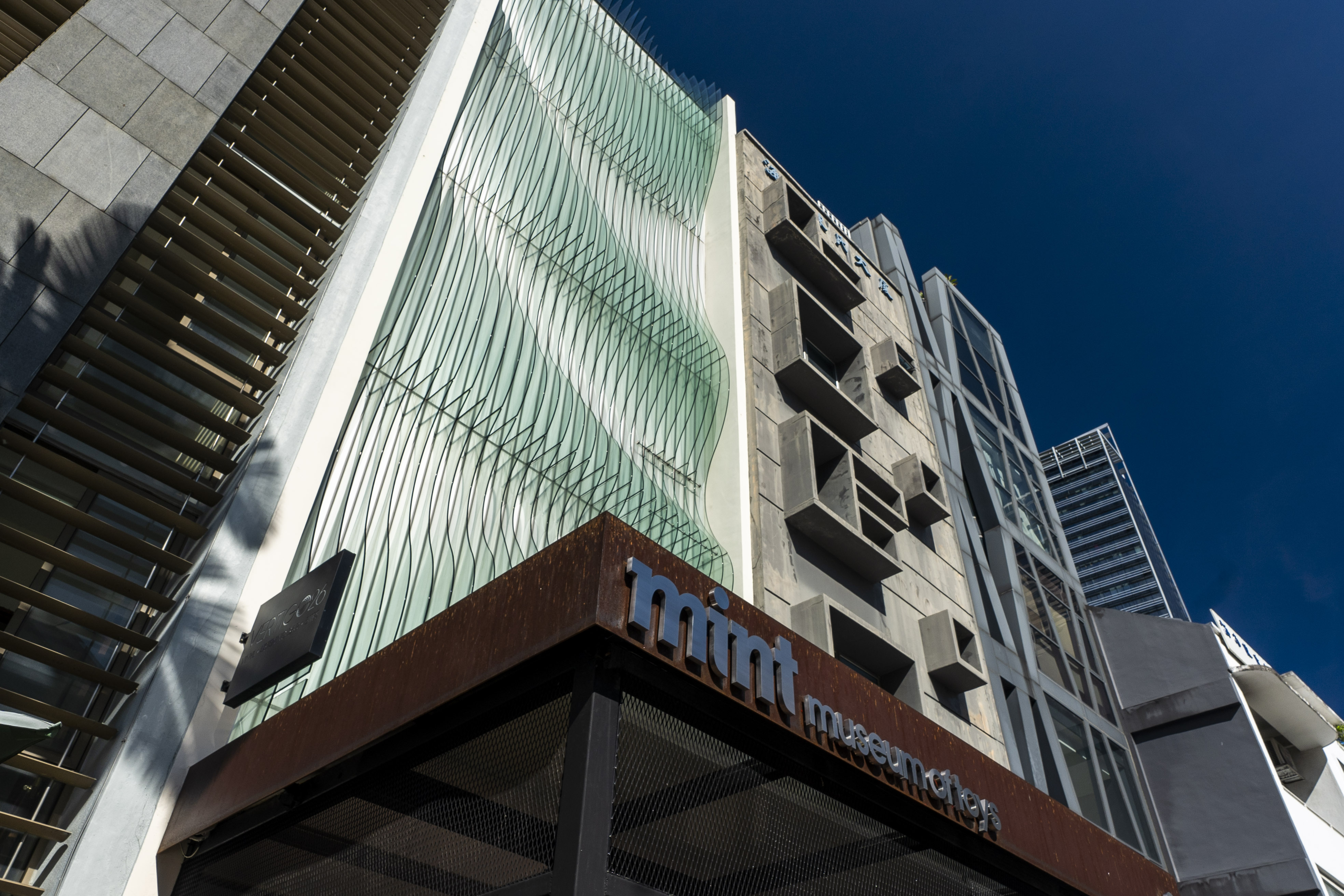
- MINT Museum of Toys

- Location in Singapore
- Established: 5 March 2007; 19 years ago
- Location: 26 Seah Street, Singapore 188382
- Coordinates: 1°17′46.7″N 103°51′16.6″E
- Type: Toy museum
- CEO: Chang Yang Fa
- Architect: Soo K. Chan
- Website: www.emint.com

The MINT Museum of Toys simplified Chinese: 玩具博物馆; Tamil: பொம்மைகளின் அரும்பொருளகம்; traditional Chinese: 玩具博物館 is a purpose-built museum located at 26 Seah Street, in the Arts and Heritage district of Singapore. The museum is dedicated to showing the private collection of toys belonging to Chang Yang Fa, the CEO and founder of the museum. It was officially opened on 5 March 2007, and officiated by the Minister for Foreign Affairs, Mr George Yeo. MINT is an acronym for Moment of Imagination and Nostalgia with Toys.

== History ==
The MINT Museum of Toys was founded by Chang Yang Fa and was established to house Chang’s private collection of vintage toys, which he began assembling in the 1980s. In 2004, he acquired the property at 26 Seah Street in Singapore’s Bras Basah Bugis arts and heritage district and initiated a redevelopment project to construct a purpose-built museum. SCDA Architects led the architectural design to preserve and display the collection. The museum was officially inaugurated in 2007 by Singapore’s Foreign Minister George Yeo.

The museum is the world’s first purpose-built toy museum and remains one of the few museums globally dedicated solely to vintage toys. The building also includes a retail space and an upper-level area that serves as an exhibition and event space.

== Collection ==
The museum holds over 50,000 items, all belonging to Chang Yang Fa. Although the museum houses a vast collection, only a curated portion is currently on display. In earlier years, up to around 8,000 items were exhibited at one time. The toys have been collected for over 30 years. There are toys hailing from over 54 countries, ranging in date from the 1840s to the 1980s.

The museum also holds collections of vintage enamel signs, vintage decorative tins, and Beatles memorabilia.

The toys are categorised into several themed collections:

- Outerspace
- Characters
- Childhood Favourites
- Collectibles
- Birth of Astro Boy
- Spooky Horror
- Bedtime Stories

The museum claims to have the world's first "Interactive AI Museum Ambassador", in the form of Antoine de Saint-Exupéry's Le Petit Prince.

The collection includes a doll reportedly once owned by Alice Liddell, the inspiration for the character in Alice’s Adventures in Wonderland, and a Steiff teddy bear dating to the early 20th century.

== Architecture ==
The windowless building prevents UV rays from reaching the exhibits; the shelves are fitted with LED lights; the shelving is designed such that no shadows are cast on the exhibits. The building's signature facade is made up of 26 glass panes shaped into a wavelike structure, which gives the museum an iconic status in Singapore's urban landscape.

For its architectural design, the building received the International Architecture Award from the Chicago Athenaeum in 2007. It was also named runner‑up in the Commercial Building category at the Cityscape Dubai Architectural Review Awards held on 4 December 2006.

== Exhibitions ==
The MINT Museum of Toys has contributed items to international exhibitions. In 2017, it loaned mid-century robot toys, including the Television Spaceman and Hero Robot, to Into the Unknown: A Journey through Science Fiction at the Barbican Centre in London. The museum also contributed rare comic books, such as Little Rascals (later re-titled Oriental Heroes) by Tony Wong, to MANGASIA: Wonderlands of Asian Comics, a touring exhibition organized by the Barbican Centre.
