= Toy and Plastic Brick Museum =

- Established: 2006
- Location: 4597 Noble St. Bellaire, Ohio 43906
- Coordinates: 40°01′42″N 80°44′27″W
- Type: Toy museum
- Director: Dan Brown
- Website: http://www.brickmuseum.net/

Toy and Plastic Brick Museum is located in Bellaire, Ohio. The museum has been known as the "Unofficial LEGO(r) Museum" and "The Plastic Brick Store, INC." The museum is host to an extensive private collection of LEGO, as well as works by brick artists Jason Burik, Eric Harshbarger, Brian Korte, and Nathan Sawaya. Toy and Plastic Brick Museum showcases the Guinness Book of World Records "World's largest LEGO image (mosaic) designed by Brian Korte of Brickworkz LLC and built as an installation by museum staff and ~250 children, where it remains for public display.
