= Jason Burik =

American Lego artist

PNC Park Lego model

Jason Burik is an American Lego artist who builds custom replica models of stadiums, buildings, homes, and other objects like the Pittsburgh Steelers' Terrible Towel. His work has been commissioned by professional sports teams, colleges, companies, and individuals in the United States.

== Early life and education ==
Born in Pittsburgh, Pennsylvania, Burik began been building Lego blocks in the seventh grade. His first project was a replica model of his parents' house.

He turned his long-time lego hobby into a business while completing his undergraduate degree in Psychology at the University of Maryland, Baltimore County after creating a model of M&T Bank Stadium.

Burik received a master's degree from the University of Pittsburgh and a doctorate degree from Capella University.

== Career ==
Burik is a principal in the Montour School District outside of Pittsburgh, PA. He previously served as an assistant superintendent and taught sixth-grade Math, Science, Social Studies, and English at David E. Williams Middle School in Kennedy Township.

After working on many different types of projects, he began teaching Lego building skills to others, leading to the creation of Burik's Lego camps. He was also the co-creator of the world's first Lego "Brick Makerspace" at Montour Elementary School.

Burik is a member of Steel City LUG, a Lego User Group for Adult Fans of Lego (AFOLs) in Pittsburgh and Western Pennsylvania.

== Notable work ==
His work can be seen at the following locations:

- UPMC Children's Hospital of Pittsburgh
- HobbyTown USA in Robinson Twp, Pennsylvania
- Bellaire Historic Society and Toy Museum in Bellaire, Ohio
- PNC Park (Pittsburgh Pirates) in Pittsburgh, Pennsylvania
- University of Maryland Baltimore County, in Baltimore, Maryland
- Panorama Towers in Las Vegas, Nevada

Some of Burik's notable projects include NCAA Final 4 Logos, M&T Bank Stadium, Heinz Field, PNC Park, Camden Yards, Cal Ripken Sr. Yard, Yankee Stadium, Bryant–Denny Stadium, Raven's Stadium, Citizens Bank Park, the City of Pittsburgh, the Terrible Towel, The Pittsburgh Children's Museum, the Pittsburgh Convention Center, the U.S. Capitol, the Empire State Building, and St. Peter's Church.

Burik has been interviewed for television by KDKA-TV (Pittsburgh), WTAE-TV (Pittsburgh), WQED (Pittsburgh), and WJZ (Baltimore), and his work has been featured in newspaper articles in the Pittsburgh Post-Gazette, Pittsburgh Tribune-Review, The Baltimore Sun, The Philadelphia Inquirer, and Pittsburgh Magazine.
