= Toy Museum, Sant Feliu de Guíxols =

Museum in Sant Feliu de Guíxols, Spain

Toy Museum
- Established: August 2000
- Location: Sant Feliu de Guíxols
- Coordinates: 41°46′55″N 3°01′45″E

The Toy Museum is located in the middle of the municipality of Sant Feliu de Guíxols, in the Baix Empordà region of Spain, and contains more than 6,500 pieces collected by Tomàs Pla, dated between the years 1870 and 1980, most of which were made in Spain.

It opened its doors in August 2000, located in a building of the Catalan Art Nouveau.

== Collection ==
The museum reveals the evolution of toys, from tin to plastic, with over 2,200 exhibits. Monographic rooms include model trains, a street of horror and dolls. The museum aims to show how children lived in the past, while bringing back old memories of childhood games.
