= Spårvägsmuseet =

Stockholm Transport Museum
- Spårvägsmuseet

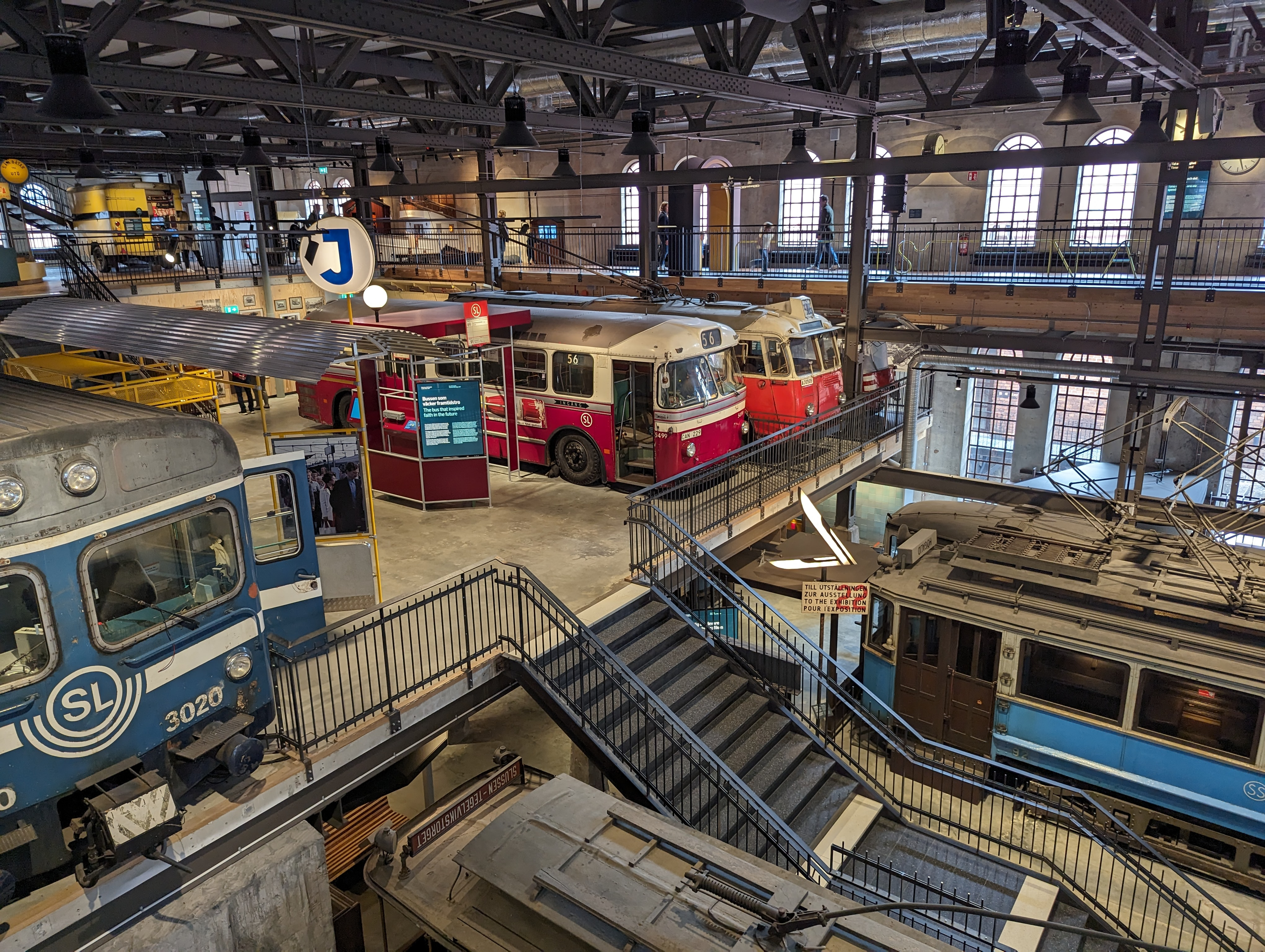
- Spårvägsmuseet in 2023
- Established: 1922
- Location: Norra Djurgårdsstaden, Stockholm, Sweden
- Coordinates: 59.358111°N 18.091903°E
- Type: Transport museum
- Collection size: Approximately 70–80 vehicles 20,000 drawings 10,000 objects 500,000 photographs
- Visitors: 77,338 (2017)
- Founder: Ernst Hjortzberg
- Owner: Storstockholms Lokaltrafik
- Website: www.sparvagsmuseet.se

Spårvägsmuseet or the Stockholm Transport Museum is a museum in Stockholm, Sweden. It is owned and operated by SL, the public organisation responsible for public transport in Stockholm County. The museum presents the development of public transport in the Stockholm region from the 19th century to the present day.

The museum’s collections include vehicles, technical drawings, photographs and historical objects related to public transport. In total, the collections comprise more than 70-80 vehicles, around 20,000 drawings, over 10,000 artefacts and approximately 500,000 photographs, of which about 30,000 are digitised.

The museum was formerly located at Tegelviksgatan 22 in the Södermalm district. It closed to the public in September 2017 and reopened on 21 May 2022 in a former gasworks building in the Hjorthagen area of Norra Djurgårdsstaden.

== History ==
The origins of the museum date back to around 1920, when tramway director Ernst Hjortzberg began collecting historical material from Stockholm’s public transport system as horse-drawn trams were being phased out. One of the earliest preserved vehicles was a horse tram from 1877.

Most of the collections were first displayed in a depot building in 1922, which is regarded as the museum’s founding year. Initially, the displays were accessible mainly to staff and invited visitors.

In 1944 the museum moved to larger premises on Tulegatan and was opened to the general public.

In 1963 the museum relocated to premises beneath Odenplan metro station. Space at this location was limited, and only part of the collection could be displayed.

Following Sweden’s change to right-hand traffic in 1967 and the closure of Stockholm’s tram network, a number of older trams and buses were transferred to the museum’s collection.

In 1990 the museum moved to the ground floor of the Söderhallen bus depot at Tegelviksgatan on Södermalm. For the first time, a large part of the collection could be exhibited in one place.

The Södermalm site closed on 10 September 2017 to make way for redevelopment. After several years of renovation and adaptation, the museum reopened on 21 May 2022 in Building 9 of the former Värtagasverket gasworks, a historic industrial structure designed by architect Ferdinand Boberg.

== Collections and exhibits ==
The museum’s collections form one of Sweden’s largest archives of local public transport history. They include more than 70–80 vehicles such as horse-drawn buses, electric trams, trolleybuses, buses and metro cars.

The oldest vehicle in the collection is a horse omnibus known as the Wurst, dating from the 1840s and considered one of the oldest preserved public transport vehicles in Sweden.

In addition to vehicles, the museum holds approximately 20,000 technical drawings, over 10,000 objects and about 500,000 photographs documenting the development of public transport and the growth of Stockholm from the 19th century to the present. The object collections include uniforms, tickets, signage, communication equipment and other operational artefacts.

Some historic vehicles are occasionally operated during special events on heritage lines such as the Djurgården line and other parts of the regional transport network.

== Gallery ==
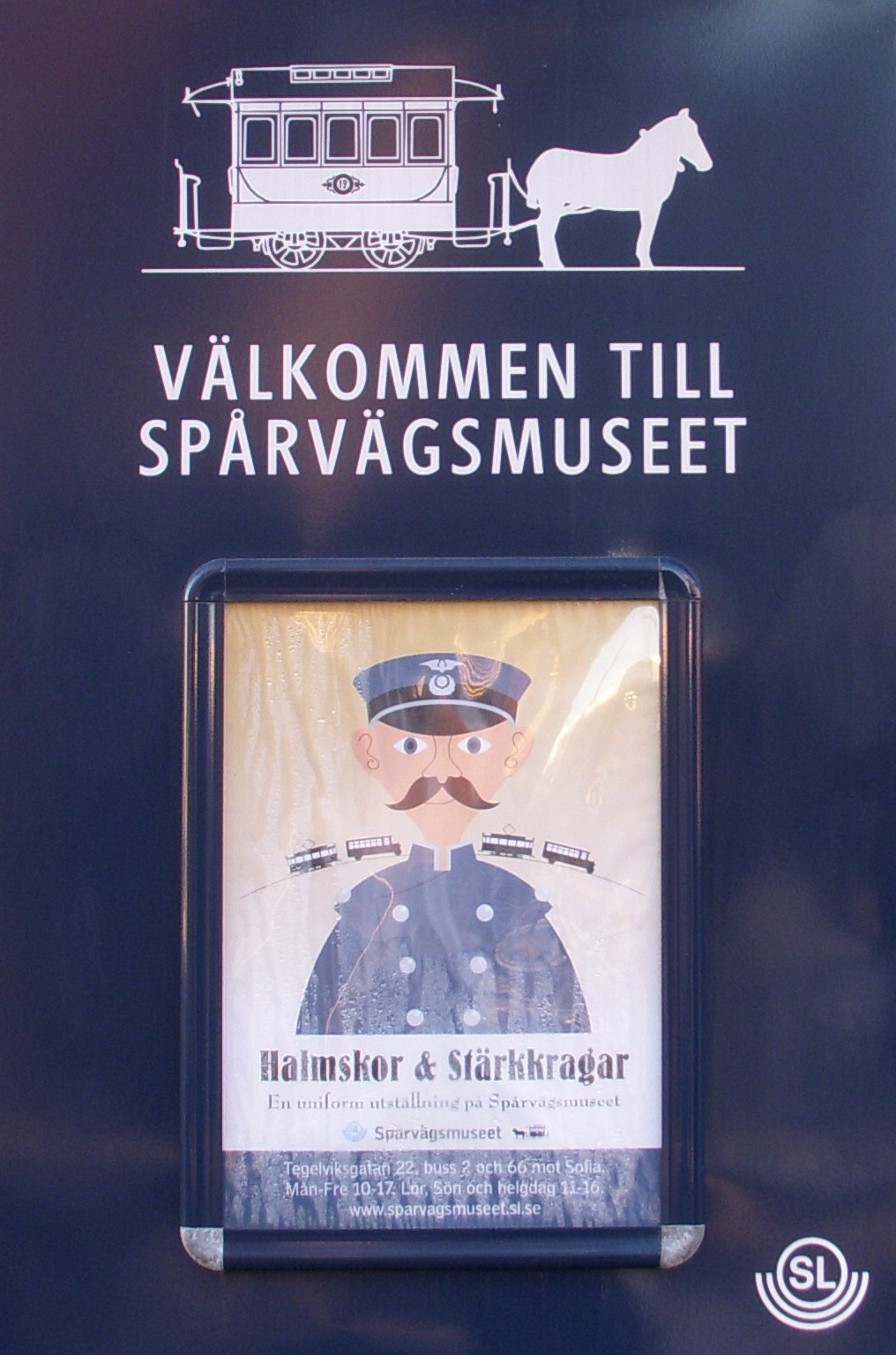
Spårvägsmuseet in 2009

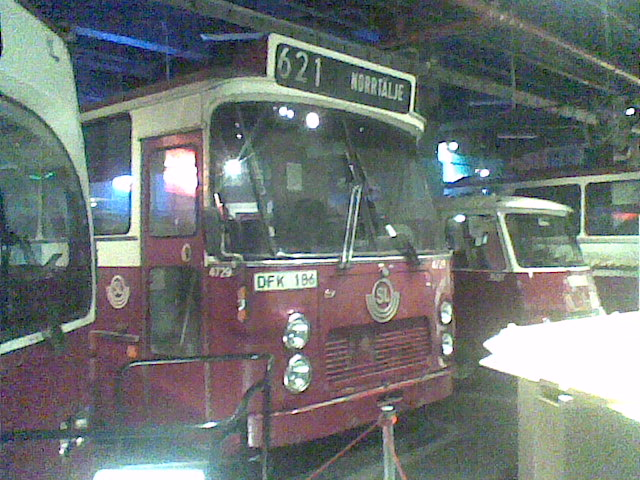
Bus at the Stockholm Transport Museum

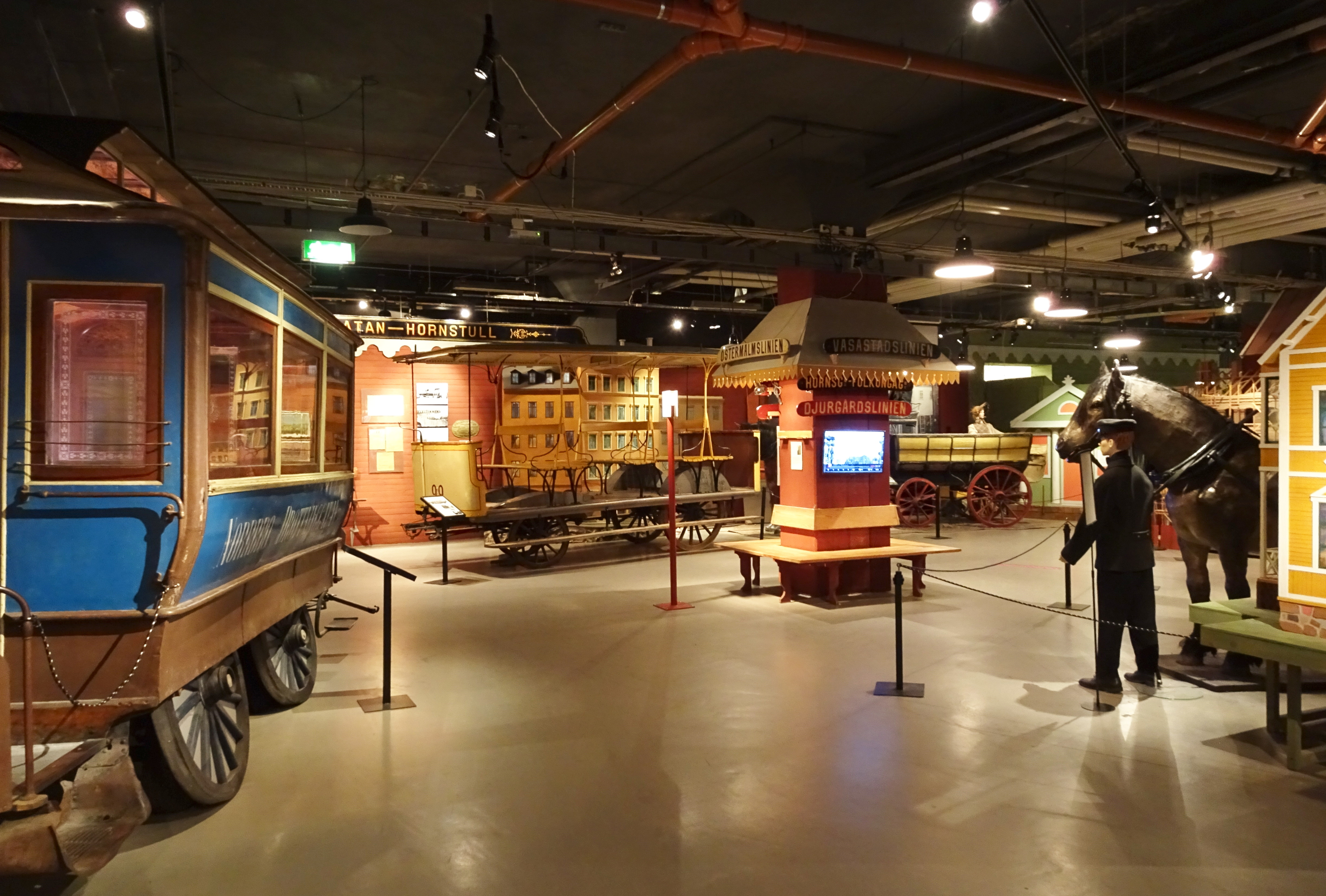
Former exhibition hall at Söderhallen

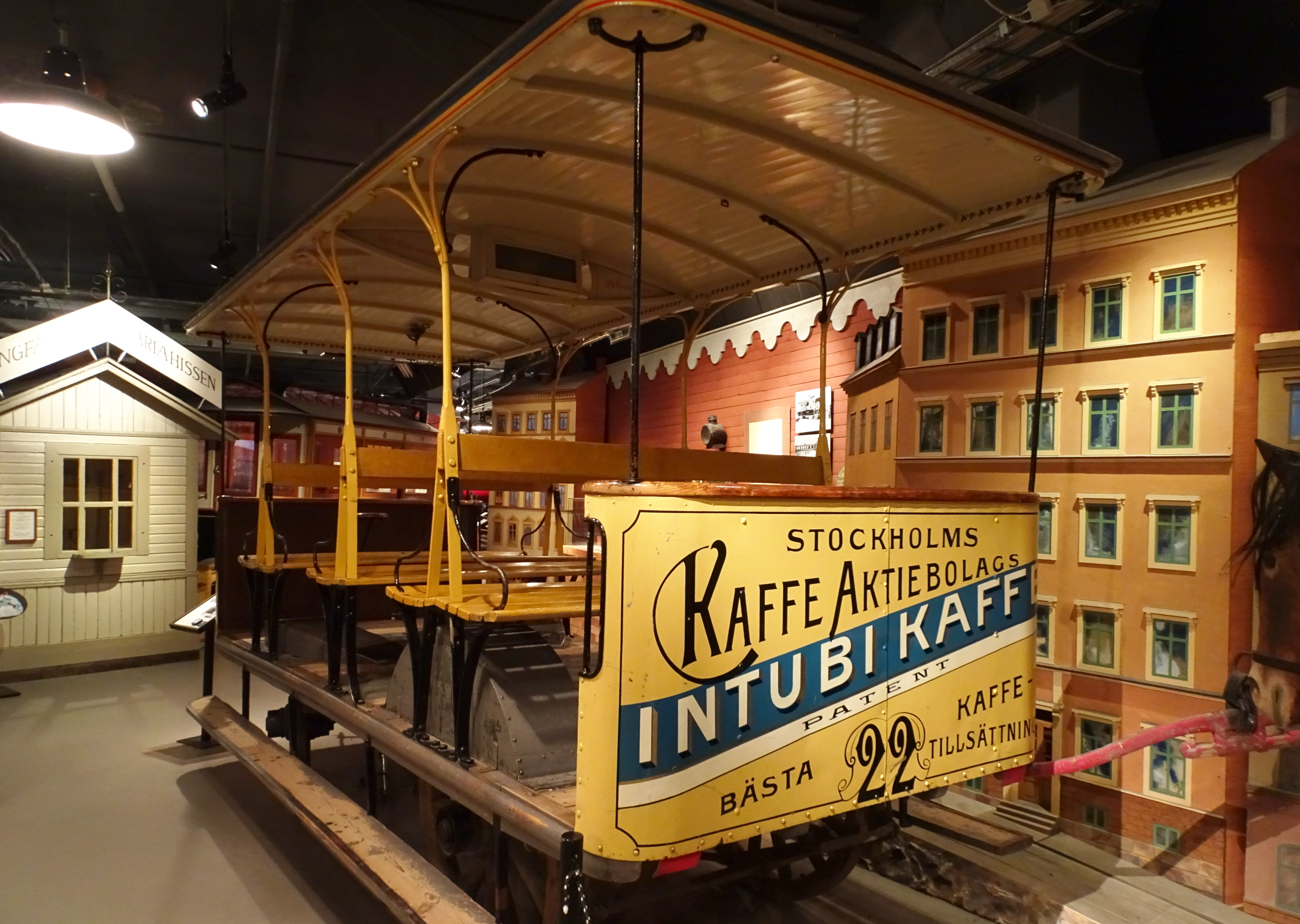
Horse tram from the collection

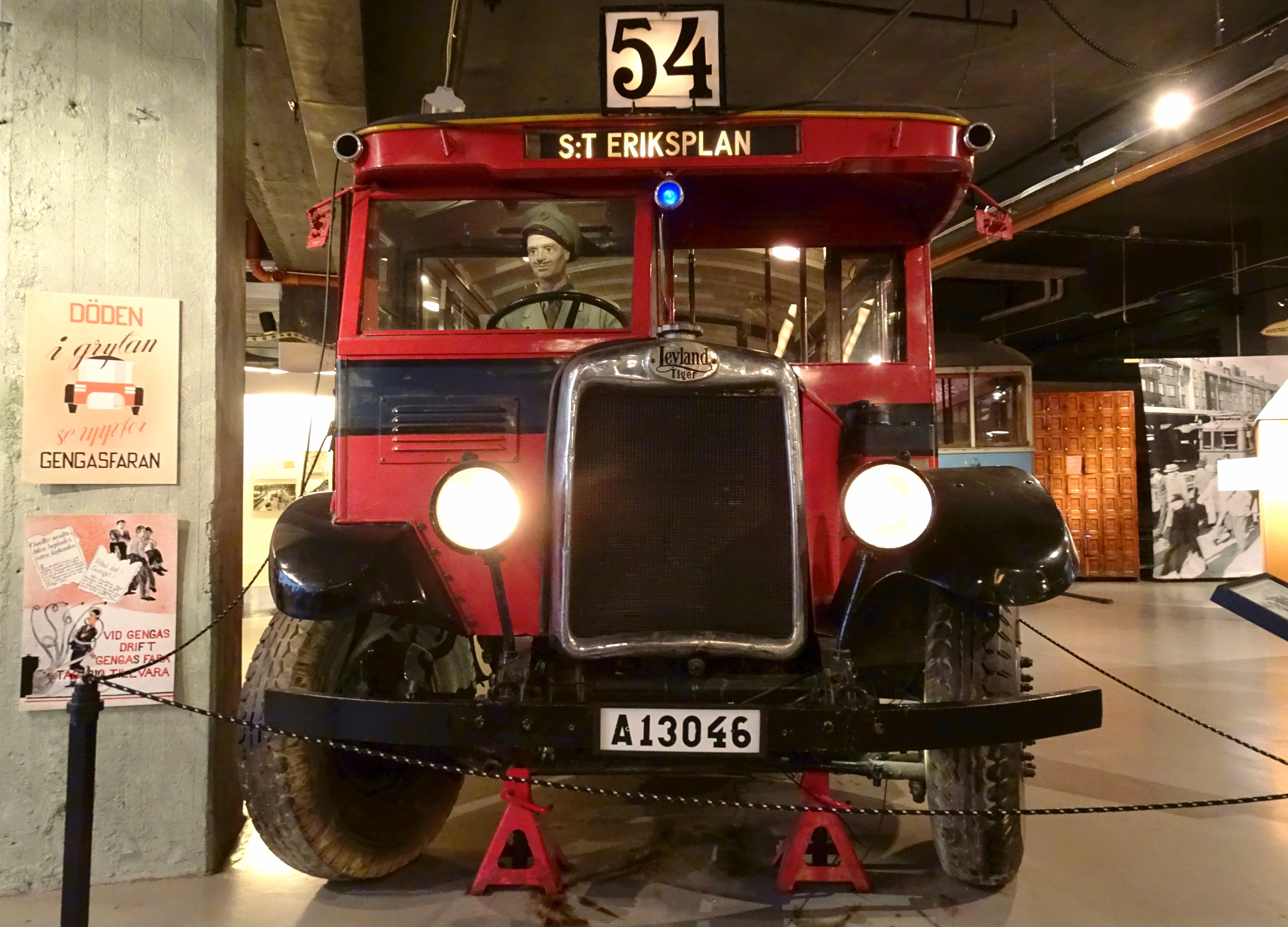
Early SL bus

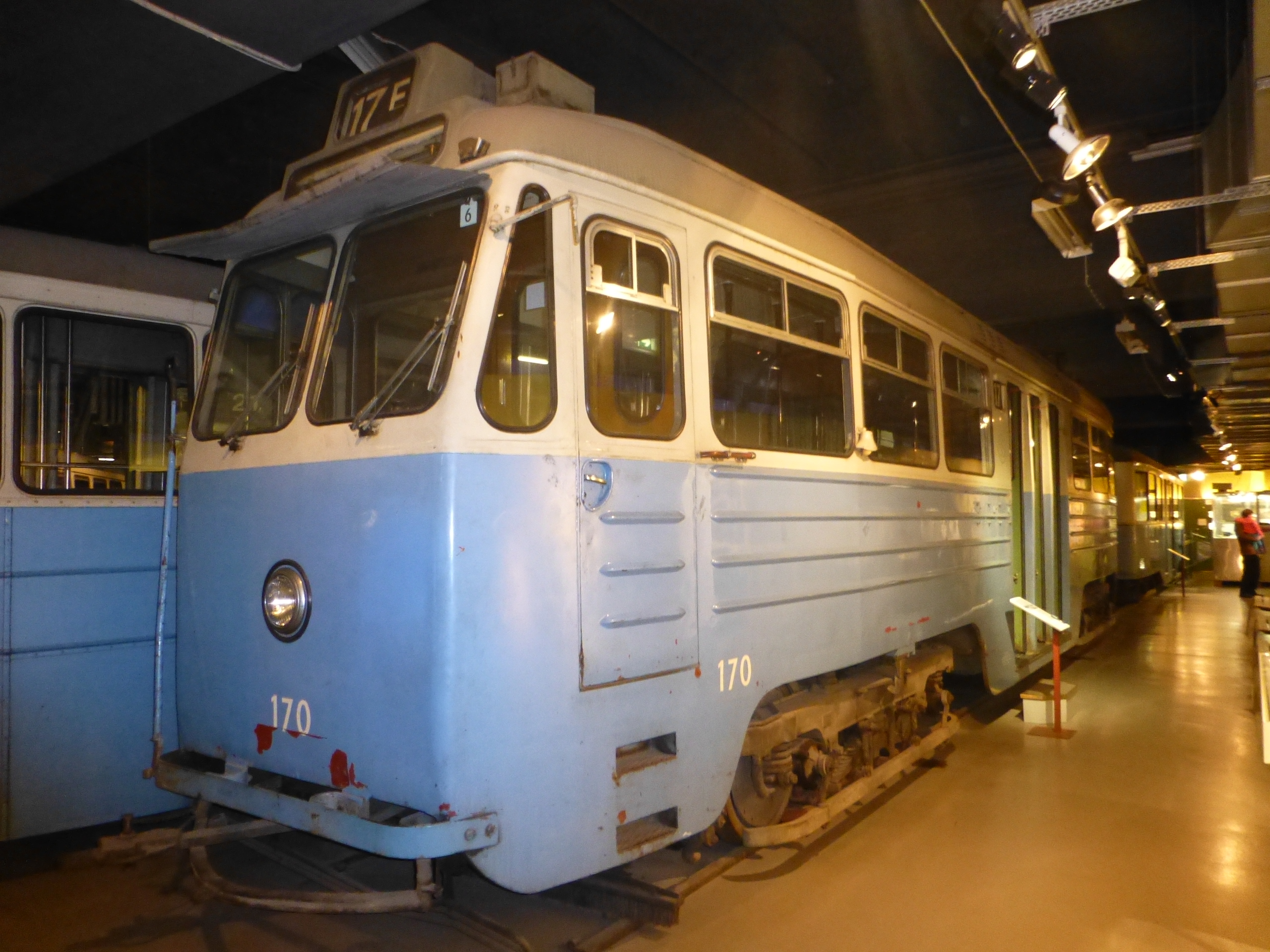
Type SS A29 tram from 1954
