= Japan Spinning Top Museum =

Toy museum in Nagoya, Japan

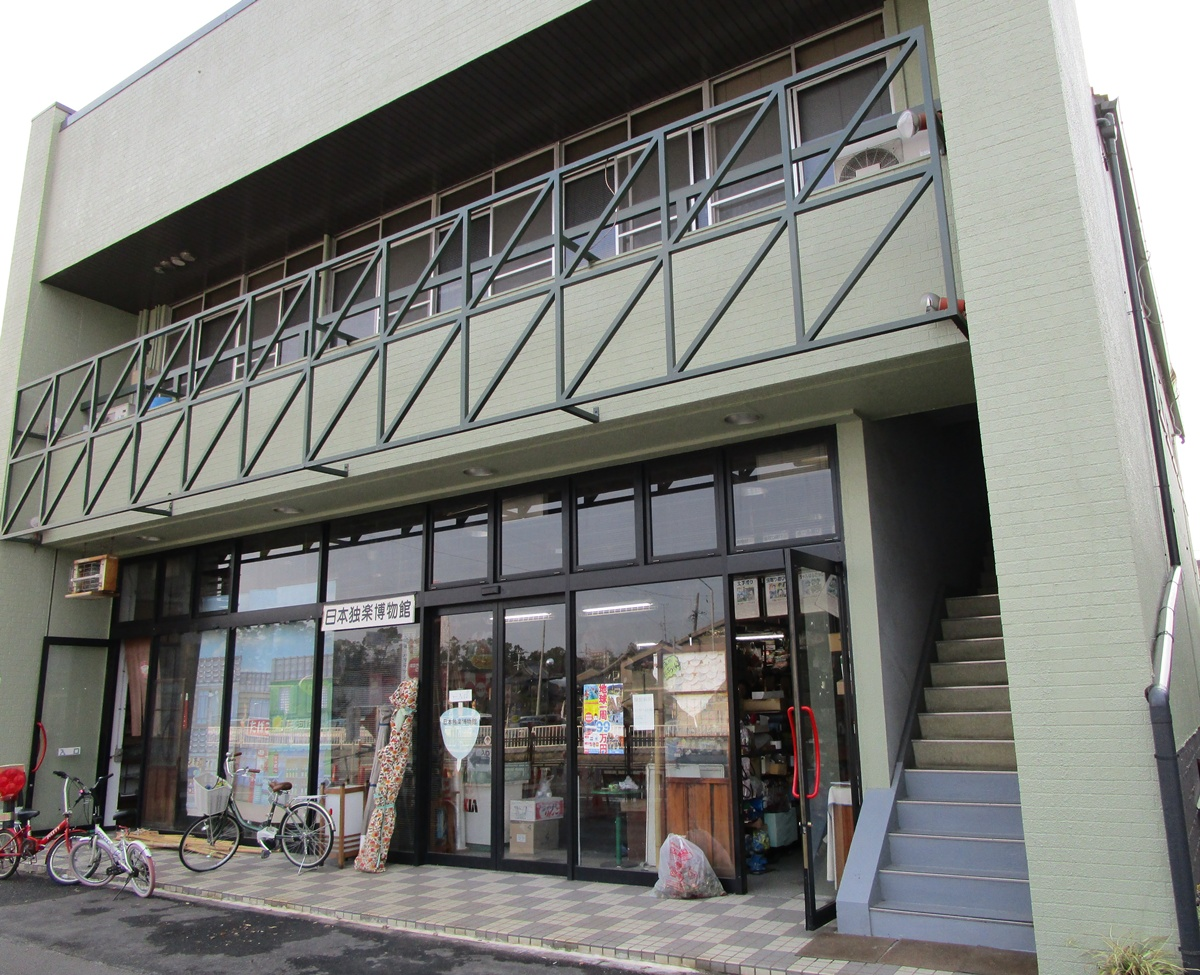
- Location: Minato-ku, Japan
- Website: Official website

The Japan Spinning Top Museum (日本独楽博物館) is a toy museum located in the city of Nagoya, central Japan.

== History ==
The spinning top, called koma (独楽) was and still is a popular traditional toy in Japan and the Chubu region. The museum has a collection of over 20,000 spinning tops not only from Japan but all over the world, many pieces which are very old. Toys that are sold in dagashiya, which are old-fashioned candy stores, and other traditional toys such as gyroscopes from around the world are also part of the collection.

Visitors are also shown and taught how to play with the toys. The museum has a store attached to it that is family-run, where visitors can buy the toys.

Access by public transport is Tsukijiguchi Station on the Meikō Line, or Inaei Station on the Aonami Line.
