= Mechelen Toy Museum =

Toy museum in Mechelen, Belgium

- Speelgoedmuseum Mechelen
- Established: April 1982
- Location: Mechelen, Belgium
- Website: \www.speelgoedmuseum.be/EN/homeEN.html

The Mechelen Toy Museum (Dutch: Speelgoedmuseum Mechelen) is a Toy Museum\ used to situated in the Nekkerspoel hamlet till 2024, now is near the Main Station in Mechelen, Belgium, is a museum containing a unique collection of past and contemporary toys on a total surface of 7,000 m^{2}. The museum was founded in April 1982, and since 1998 it is a recognized museum. The permanent collection is subdivided in the following categories:

- Circus and kermesse
- Construction toys
- Creative and educational toys
- Stuffed toys
- Mechanical and iron toys
- Optical and sound-making toys
- Puppets
- Puzzles and board games
- Soldiers
- Toys around the world
- Traditional child games and Pieter Bruegel
- Trains
- Transport in miniature

Apart from that there are also changing exhibitions. The museum also has an educational service with school programmes.
