= Nekkerspoel =

- Neighbourhood
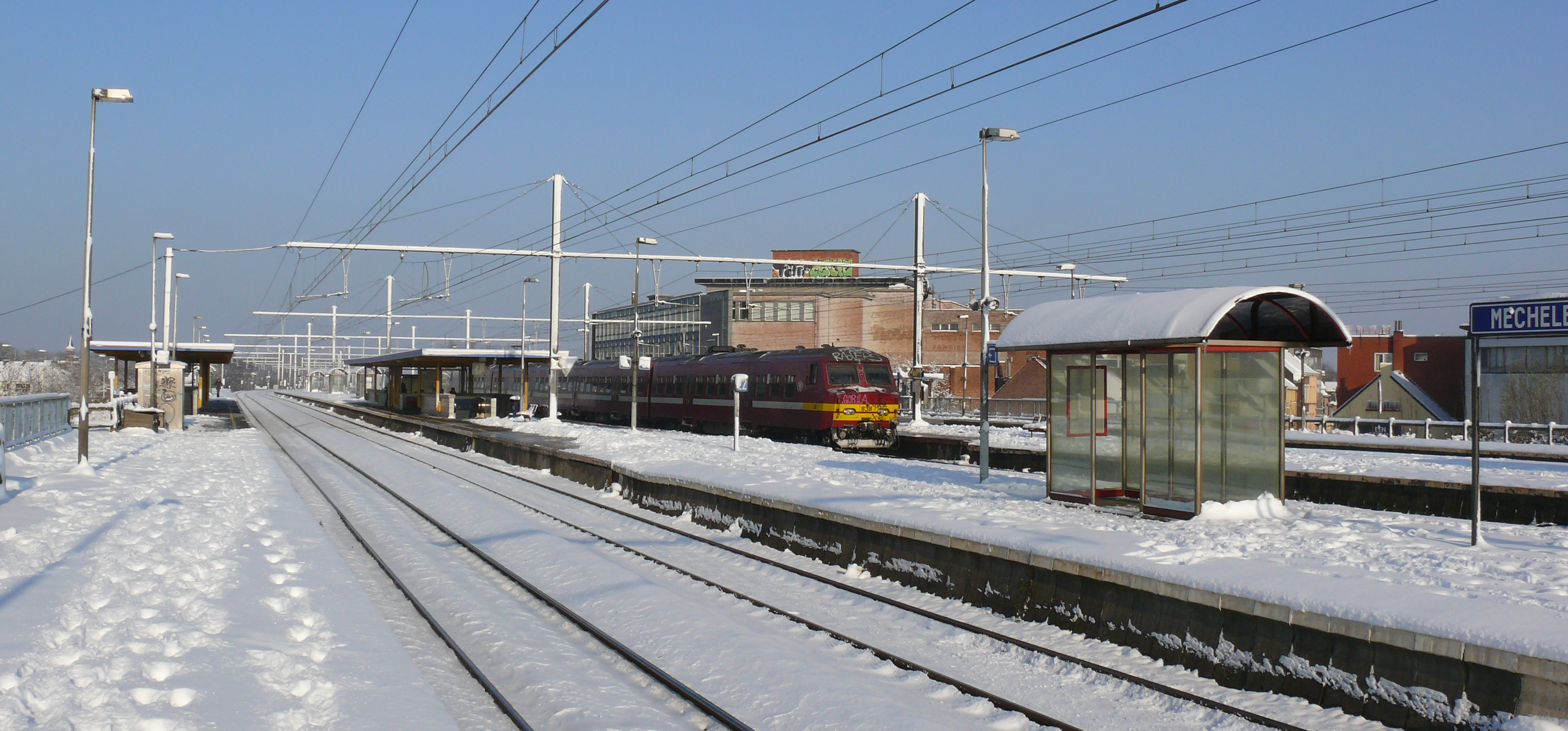
- Station Mechelen Nekkerspoel, train 838 (type MS75) arriving at platform 4, direction Brussels

- Location in Belgium
- Coordinates: 51°1′51″N 4°29′56″E
- Country: Belgium
- Region: Flemish Region
- Province: Antwerp
- Municipality: Mechelen

Area
  - Total: 2.67 km^{2} (1.03 sq mi)

Population (2021)
  - Total: 8,088
  - Density: 3,030/km^{2} (7,850/sq mi)
- Time zone: CET

Nekkerspoel is a neighbourhood of Mechelen, Belgium, immediately east of the city. The name means pool of one or more Nekkers or water demons. and it is presumed that in earlier centuries locals taking a shortcut through the marshlands, of which the Mechels Broek is a surviving remnant, may have strayed off safer pathways and lost their lives. In 1904, remnants dating from the La Tène era of a settlement of several wooden houses and an 8.4 metre long oaken dugout canoe were found at a depth of 5 metres.

This hamlet was already well-populated and built-up at a time that otherwise mainly a few monasteries were seen outside the city's former walls. Meanwhile, it obtained Mechelen's secondary station on Belgium's major Brussels-Mechelen-Antwerp railway, and the Toy Museum (Speelgoedmuseum) with exhibits covering 7,000 m² in the former furniture manufacturer's Nova building.

By the end of the third quarter of the 20th century, sand from nearby rivers had been disposed on a part of the Mechels Broek along the river Dijle. Shortly thereafter sandwinning created two large pools while the remainder physically supports the provincial sports and recreation complex De Nekker, which in summer also offers swimming at the artificial beach in a safe-guarded part of the larger of the man-made pools. Though from beside its main building one may start walking along the Mechels Broek, the latter's visitor centre is at the Mechlinian suburb of Muizen and the nature reserve stretches onto the neighbouring municipality of Bonheiden.

Located between the actual hamlet and the sports complex, the 18,000 m² multi-functional events hall named Nekkerhal is widely known for e.g. erotica exhibitions (Mega Erotica Beurs) once in a blue moon but each time with broad media coverage, its regular flea markets (Bras Vlooienmarkt), sports promotion days ('Doe-aan-sportbeurs), and other temporary events drawing public with a specific interest such as informatics or specialty cars, or of a particular profession as for the International Furniture Festival trade market. It had originally been built by the municipality for housing Europe's largest cooperative vegetable auction, when this had outgrown its buildings along Mechelen's minor ring road that replaced the city walls. By the time it was finished however, the auction had moved to the neighbouring municipality of Sint-Katelijne-Waver. Mechelen leaves the property in the care of the Nekkerhal non-profit organization.

== See also ==
- Mechelen
- Neck (water spirit)
- Neckerspoel, busstation in Eindhoven, the Netherlands, named after the local historic bogs called Neckerspoelen.
