= Istanbul Toy Museum =

- İstanbul Oyuncak Müzesi
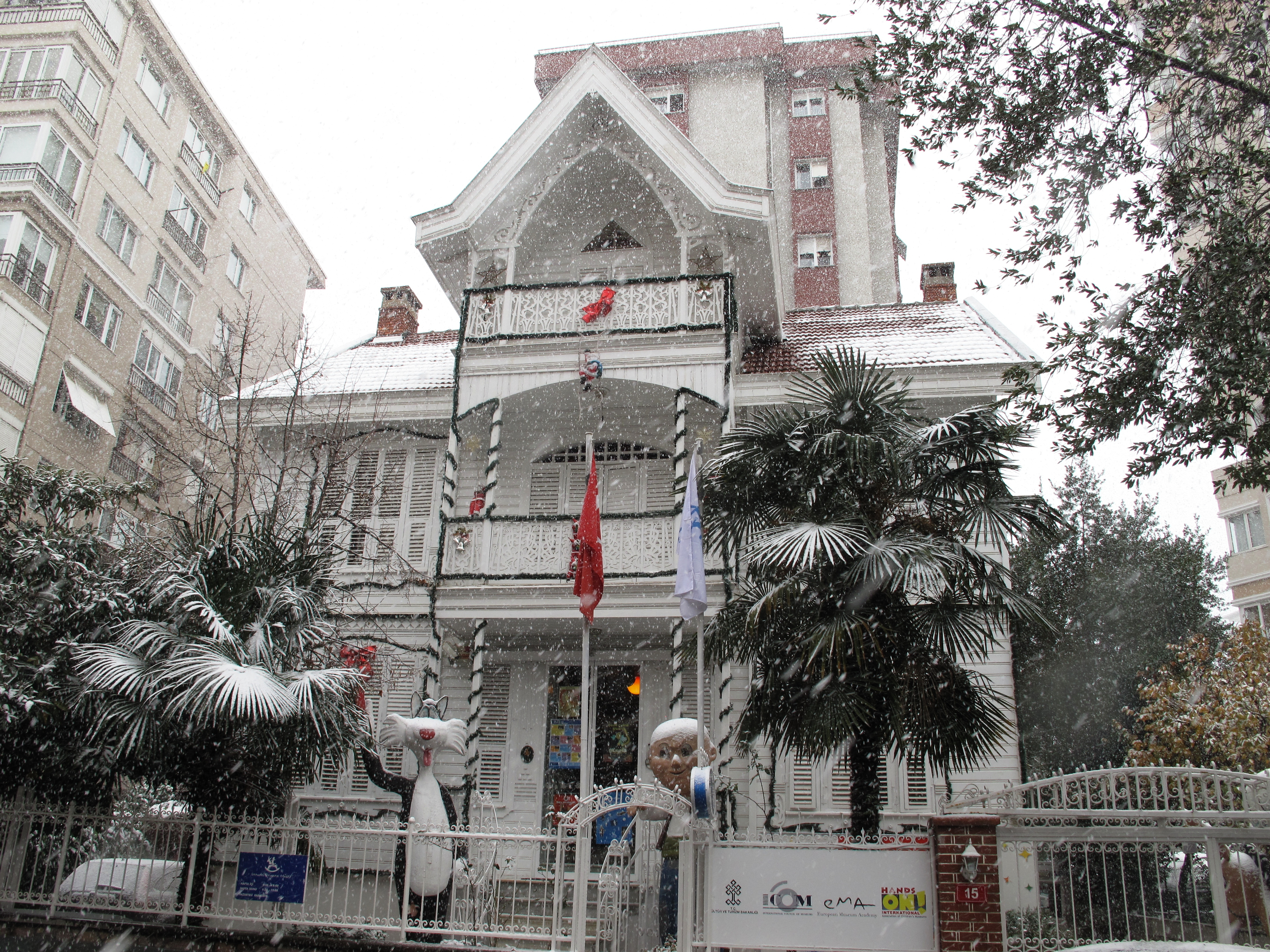
- Front view

- Location of Istanbul Toy Museum
- Established: April 23, 2005; 21 years ago
- Location: Göztepe, Istanbul, Turkey
- Coordinates: 40.97593°N 29.07073°E
- Type: Toy museum
- Collection size: 4,000 toys and miniatures
- Owner: Sunay Akın
- Public transit access: Bus, suburb train
- Website: www.istanbuloyuncakmuzesi.com

The Istanbul Toy Museum (Turkish: İstanbul Oyuncak Müzesi) is a toy museum located in the Göztepe neighbourhood of Kadıköy district in Istanbul, Turkey.

The museum was founded by the Turkish poet and novelist, Sunay Akın, in 2005. The museum opened on April 23, a national holiday in Turkey, National Sovereignty and Children's Day. Currently, the museum has on display 4,000 toys and miniatures from Turkey and abroad; many of the exhibits are antiques, some of which date back nearly 200 years. The first floor of the museum is the site of the Eyüp Toy Shop, a famous toy shop that closed down in the 1950s.

In 2012, the museum was nominated and shortlisted for the annual European Museum Academy Children's Museum Award.

The museum is open weekdays (except Mondays), 9:30-18:00, and weekends, 9:30-19:00. It is located at Ömerpaşa Caddesi, Dr. Zeki Zeren Sokak 17, Göztepe-Kadıköy, Istanbul.

== Gallery ==
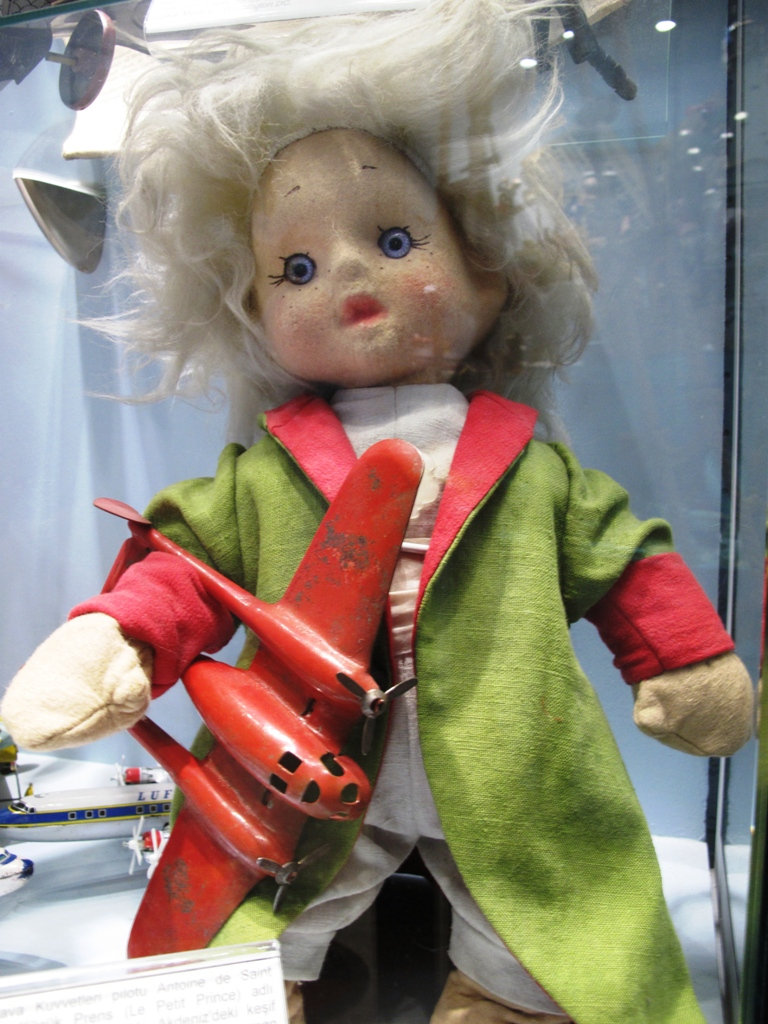
Plane toy based on a real plane P-38 in which Antoine de Saint-Exupéry died

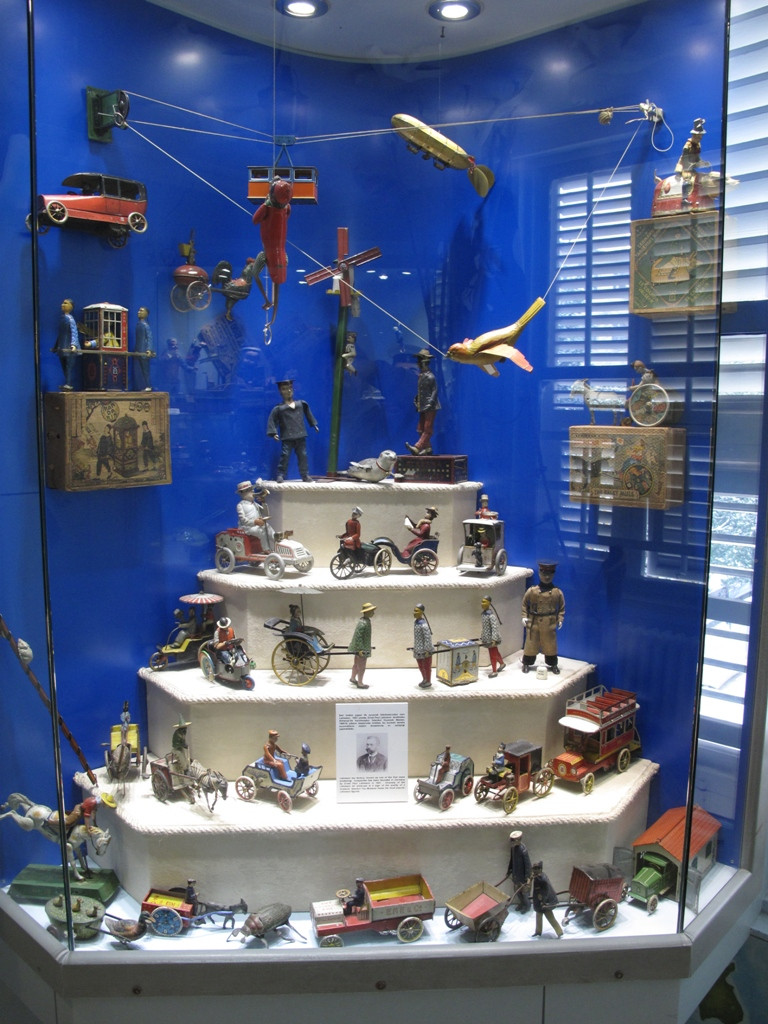
Toy produced by the famous toy producer Ernst Paul Lehmann

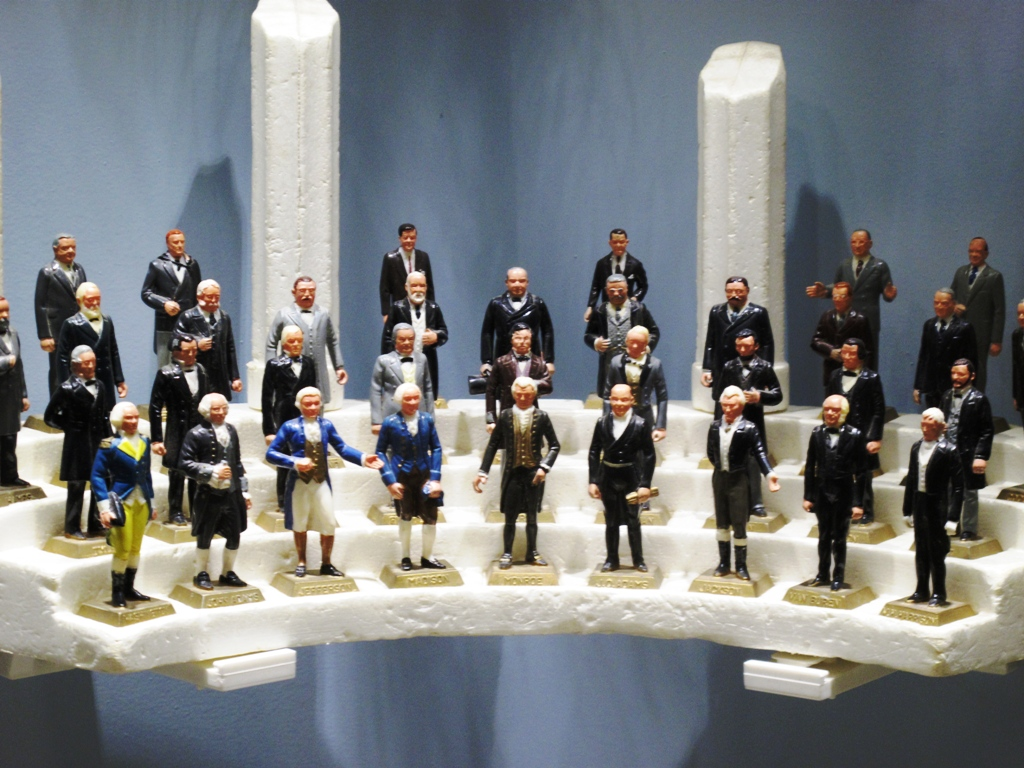
Figurines of American presidents

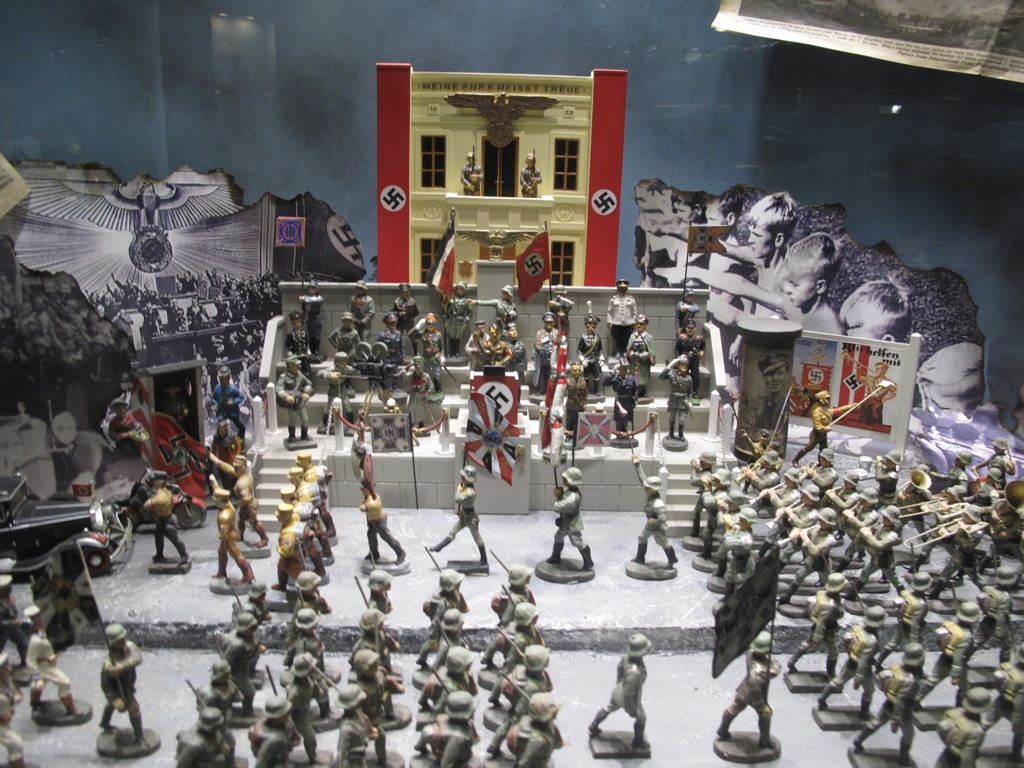
Second World War, Germany 1933–1940

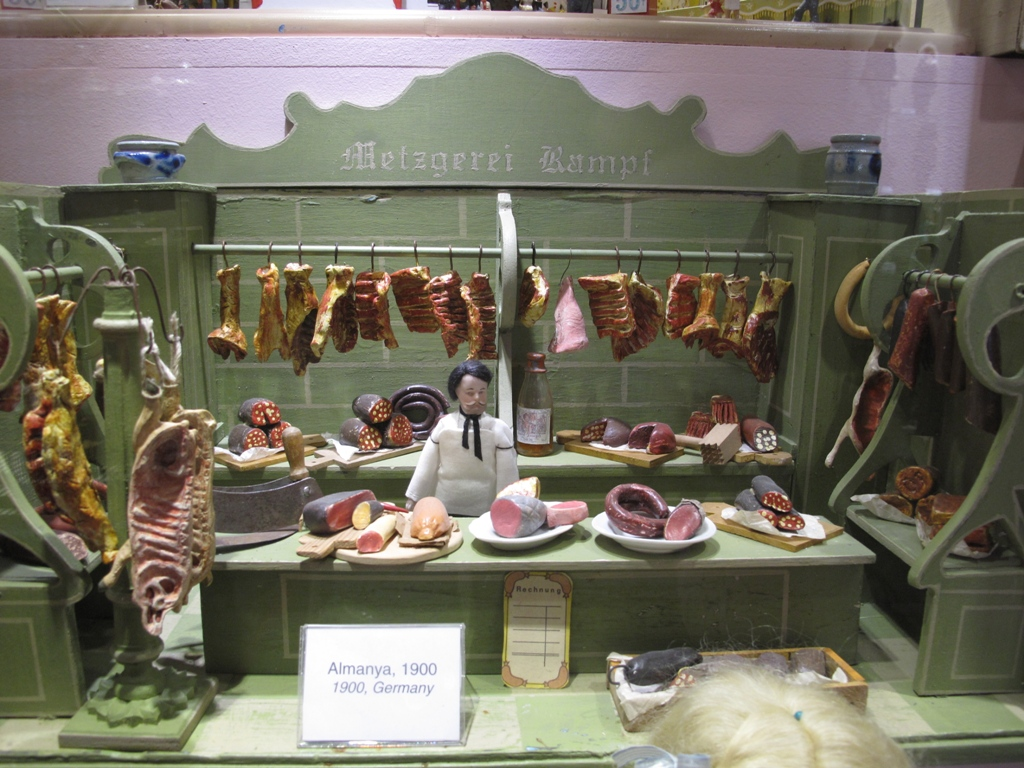
Dollhouse – butcher, Germany 1900
