= State Museum of Toys (Kyiv) =

Toy museum in Kyiv, Ukraine

The State Museum of Toys
- Державний музей іграшок
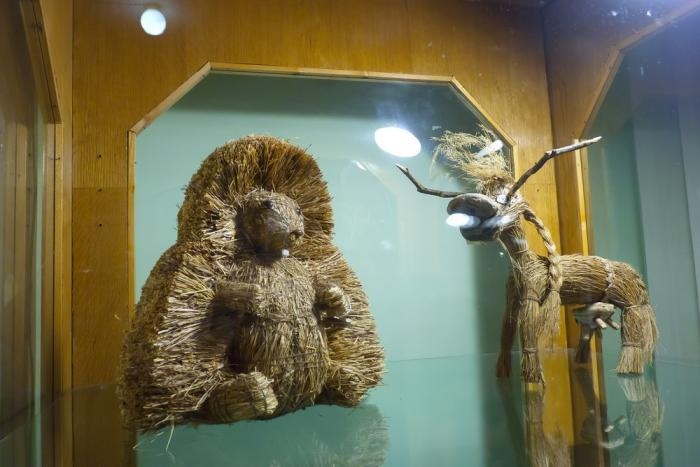
- Established: January 2005
- Location: Klovskiy Descent Str., 8, Kyiv, Ukraine
- Coordinates: 50°26′27″N 30°32′17″E
- Visitors: 20 000 / year
- Website: muzey-igrashki.com.ua

The State Museum of Toys (Ukrainian: Державний музей іграшок, romanized: Derzhavnyi muzei ihrashok) is one of the unique museum in Kyiv (Ukraine).

== History ==
The idea of creating the museum of toys arose in 1933 when according to Decree of CPSU on August 26, 1933, No.202 "Production of Children's Toys" initiated the creation of Toy Museums in Moscow, Tbilisi, Tashkent and Kharkiv.

In 1936 in Kyiv was opened a permanent exhibition of toys that began a unique collection of the future museum of toys.

== Collection ==
In a total, museum collection containing more than 15000 exhibits that highlight the history of Ukrainian toy production — industrial design toys, unique and original handmade toys and extremely colorful collection of Ukrainian folk toys.

=== Exhibitions ===
The museum has three permanent exhibitions. This is the history of toys, “Ukrainian folk toy” and original works that are unique.

== See also ==
- Lviv Museum of Toys (Lviv, Ukraine)
- Museum of Transport Models (Vinnytsia, Ukraine)
- The Strong Museum of Play
