= Tartu Toy Museum =

Museum in Tartu, Estonia

Coordinates: 58°22′56.4″N 26°43′5.34″E

- Tartu Mänguasjamuuseum
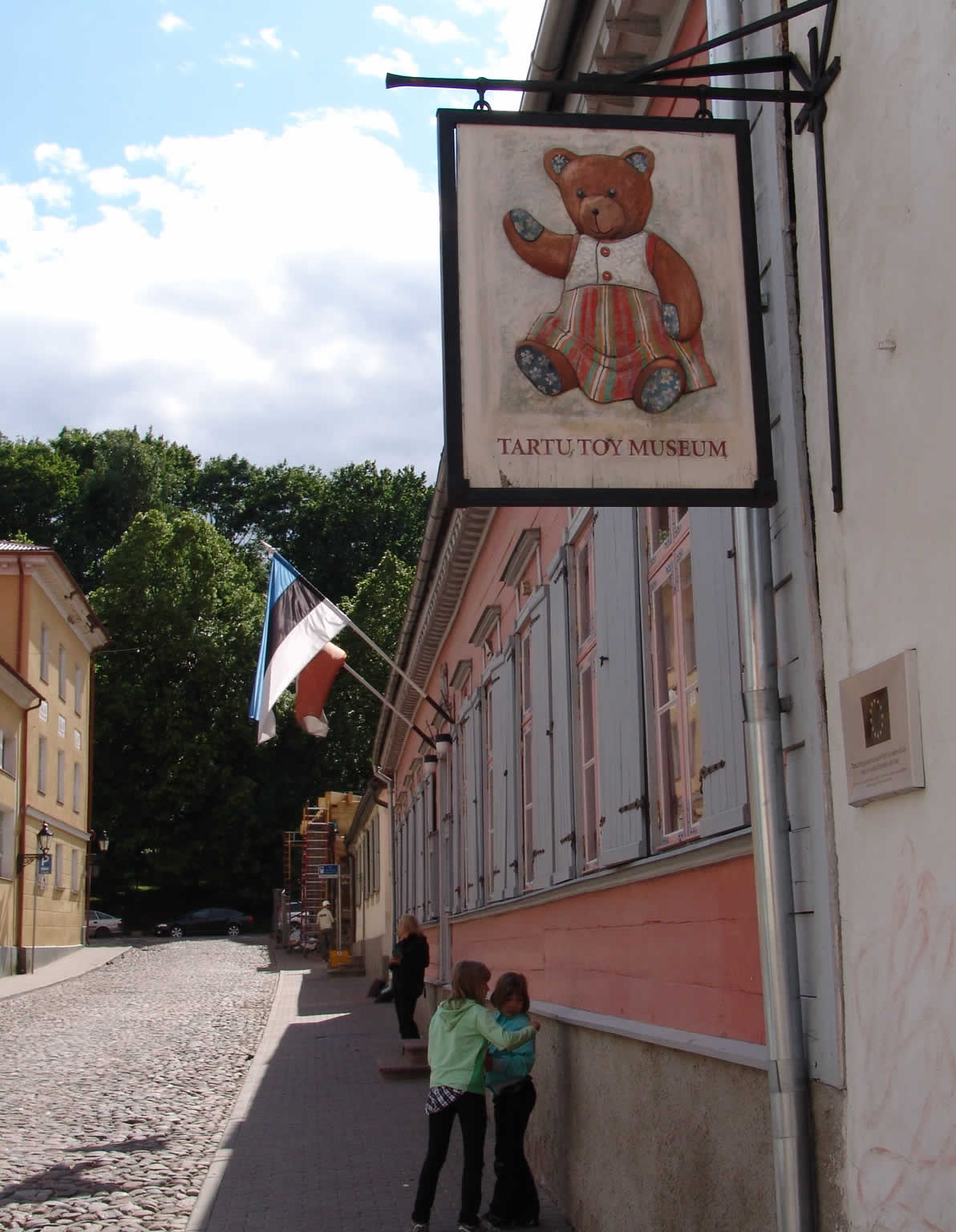
- Established: 29 May 1994
- Location: Tartu, Estonia
- Type: Children's museum
- Collection size: 5000+
- Visitors: 43'000+ (in 2010)
- Director: Triin Vaaro
- Website: www.mm.ee

Tartu Toy Museum (Tartu Mänguasjamuuseum) is the biggest toy museum in the Baltic States, located in Tartu, Estonia. It displays over 5000 toys from its vast collection and has several interactive toys for the visitors to try out, as well as a playroom for children. In 2005 the film puppets exhibition was opened in the courtyard house, exhibiting film puppets made in Estonia over the last 50 years, props and sketches of animated movies.

Tartu Toy Museum was founded in 1994 and since 2004 is located in one of the oldest wooden buildings (dating from the 1770s) in Tartu, on Lutsu Street.

In 2010 the Toy Museum opened its Theatre House, which is a unique children's theatre inspired by a museum. In addition to a theatre hall there is also a theatre puppet museum, a room from a medieval house that was uncovered during the archaeological excavations, a children's studio for theatre-themed programs, opportunities to do handicraft, play and discover the world of theatre.

== History ==
The Tartu Toy Museum opened on 29 May 1994 under the auspices of the City Government of Tartu. The museum was located in the basement of a private house at the foot of Toome Hill and in a smaller adjoining building at the address 1 Lai St. The founders of the museum were Meeri Säre, Mare Hunt and Tiia Toomet, the latter became also the first director of the toy museum. Since 2007 the director of the toy museum has been Triin Vaaro.

In late 2003, the Tartu Toy Museum moved to its new location, an old wooden building on Lutsu Street, which had been specially renovated to house the museum. On 13 March 2004 a new permanent exhibit was opened, including a playroom and crafts room. On 2 December 2005, the house of theatre and animation puppets was opened in the former coach house in the yard of the museum. The characters and props of animation films made in Estonia during the last 50 years and sketches of cartoons that were previously exhibited in Toy Museum's Film Puppets Gallery (Ülikooli St. 1) are now seen in this courtyard house. Until 2010 there was also an exposition of theatre puppets from Estonia and elsewhere in the courtyard house.

In 2010 the Toy Museum opened Theatre House for children and family plays, with a Children's Studio for different activities and a small museum of theatre puppets.

== Mascot ==
The mascot of Tartu Toy Museum is Teddy Flower-paw, who was sewn in 1994 by Kai Maser. The name of the teddy in the national folk costume skirt comes from the flower-patterned cloth that was used to sew its paws. Teddy Flower-paw has done a very good job in representing the museum: there are books written about her, postcards drawn, she has appeared on television and at events.
