= Penang Toy Museum =

Toy museum in Teluk Bahang, Malaysia

Coordinates: 5.4565°N 100.2164°E

- Established: 2005
- Location: Teluk Bahang, Penang, Malaysia
- Type: Toy museum
- Website: penangtoymuseum.com

Penang Toy Museum is a toy museum located at 1370, Mk 2, Teluk Bahang (Next to SJK (C) Eok Hua School), Penang, Malaysia. With more than 110,000 toys, dolls and other collectible items, it is the largest toy museum in the world. The 1,000 square meters museum, opened in 2005, was also recognised by the Malaysian Book of Records as the first toy museum in the country. The museum is visited by an estimated 100,000 visitors each year.

== History ==
The museum was founded by engineer Loh Lean Cheng. He got his inspiration while visiting the London Toy and Model Museum. The first toy that he bought back in 1973 was a Popeye doll.

== Museum sections ==
- Cave of Dinosaurs
- Chamber of Comic Book Heroes
- Chamber of Fantasy
- Chamber of Horrors
- Chamber of Monsters
- Fields of Combat
- Hall of Beauties
- Hall of Cartoons
- Hall of Celebrities
- Hall of Rock Legends
- Hall of Virtual Reality
- Star Wars Collections

== Collections ==
The museum features more than 110,000 toys and figures. There are another 30,000 toys that are kept in storage as the museum is not big enough to accommodate all of the toys. Some of the toys displayed in the museum were obtained direct from Hollywood.

The museum features a notable 1.8m-tall Japanese Gundam robot, which cost RM9000. Other life size figures include Batman, Indiana Jones, Iron Man, Jack Sparrow, King Kong, Kung Fu Panda, Lara Croft, Monsters, Inc. characters, Power Rangers, Sheriff Woody, Shrek, Silver Surfer, Spider-Man, Superman, WALL-E and others.

The toy collections include Disney's characters such as One Hundred and One Dalmatians, A Bug's Life, Lilo & Stitch, Peter Pan, Pinocchio, Snow White and the Seven Dwarfs, The Incredible Hulk, The Lion King and The Little Mermaid. Also featured are Barbie dolls, Doraemon, Dragon Ball, the Fantastic Four, Frankenstein's monster, Garfield, the Hulk, Looney Tunes characters, Mr. Bean, Pokémon toys, Snoopy, Spider-Man, Superman, WWE figures, X-Men figures, and others.

The walls and ceiling of the museum are decorated with an Egyptian theme, featuring Pharaoh and sphinx statues.

== See also ==
- Malacca Toy Museum
