= Toy Museum (Melaka) =

Museum in Melaka Tengah, Malacca, Malaysia

- Muzium Mainan
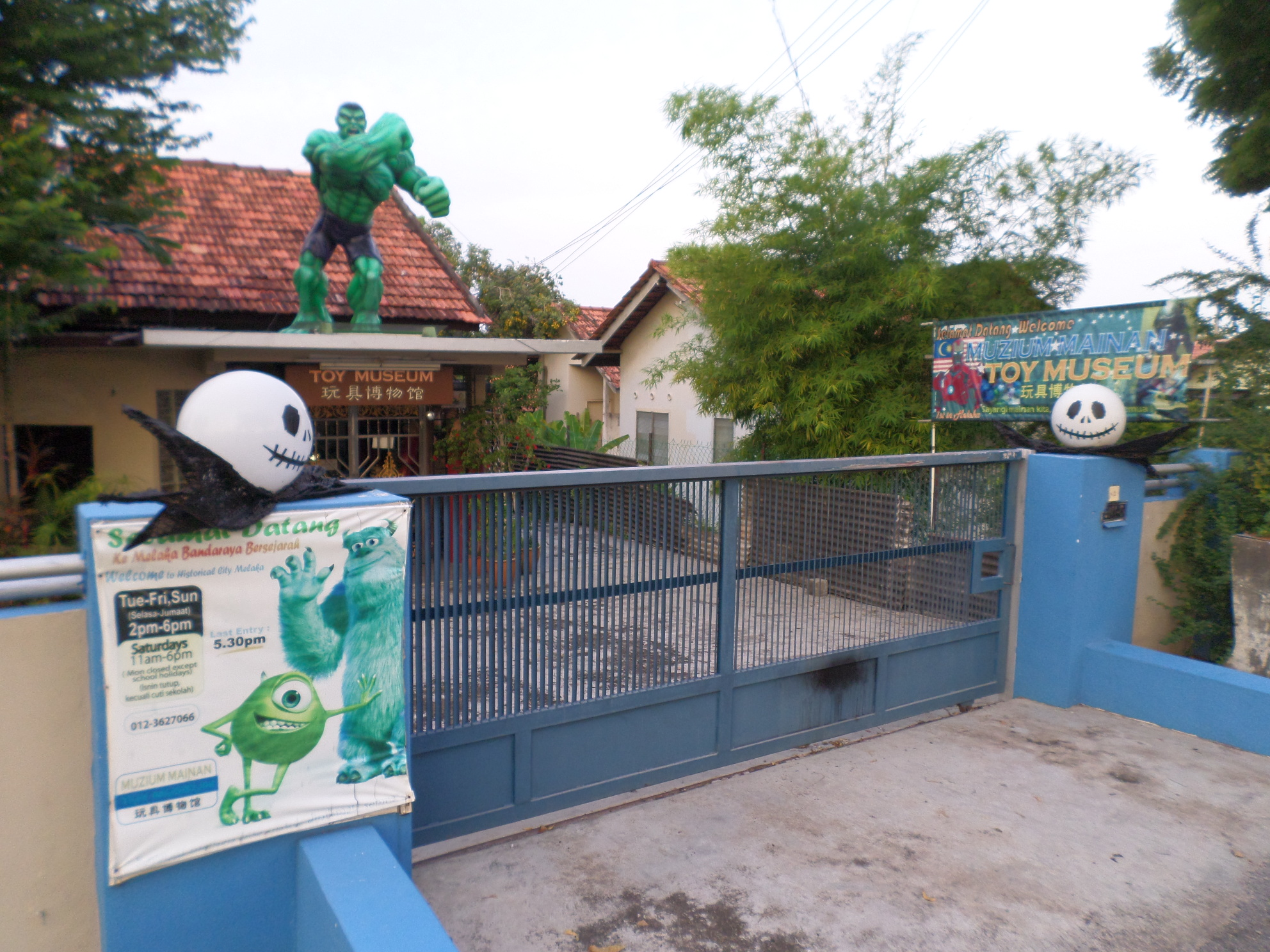
- Established: 2009 (original location); October 2011 (current location)
- Location: Penghulu Abbas Street, Bukit Baru, Malacca, Malaysia
- Coordinates: 2°13′19.7″N 102°16′37.0″E
- Type: museum
- Owner: George Ang
- Website: melakatoymuseum.blogspot.com

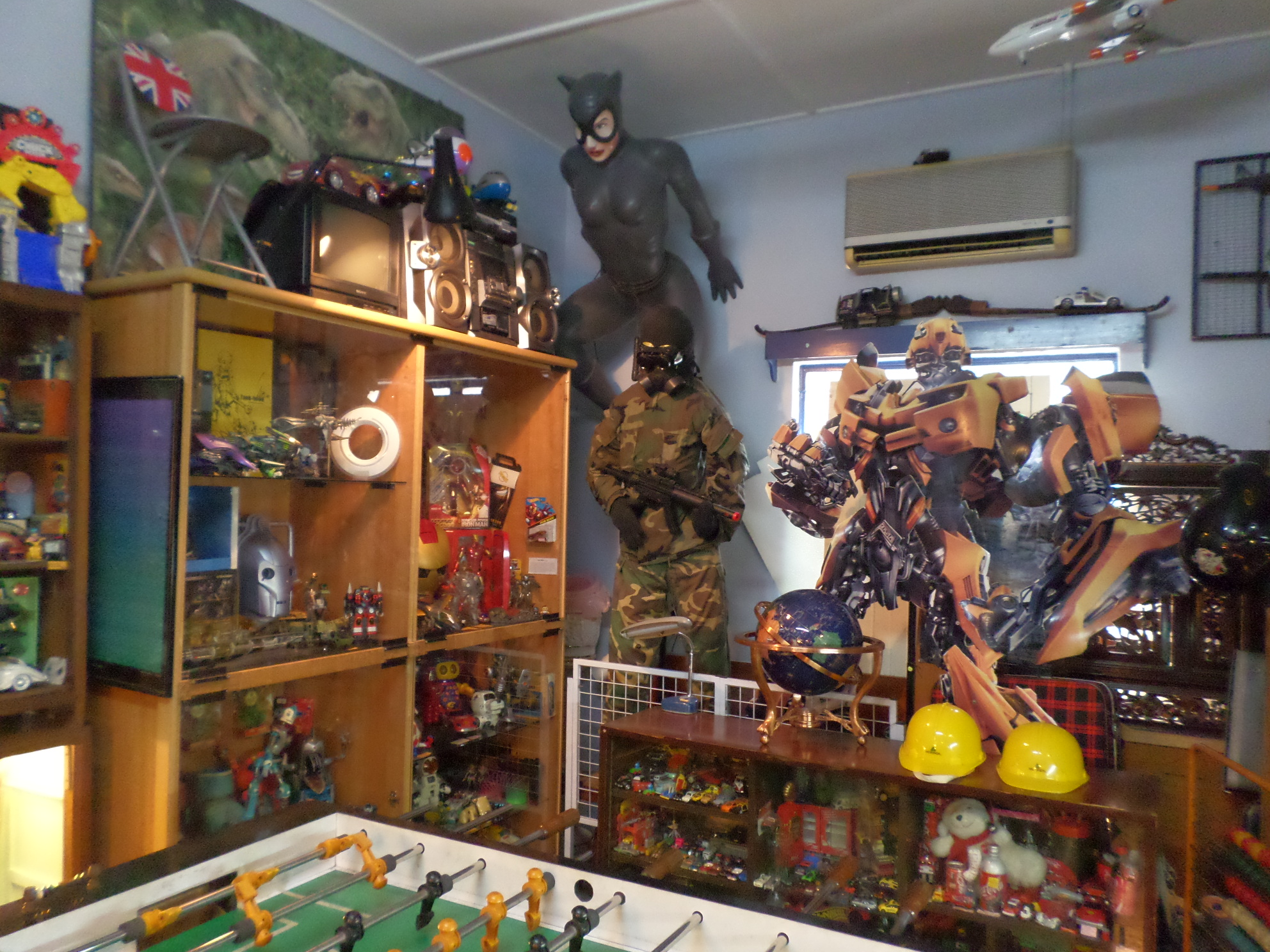
Toy Museum exhibition hall

Melaka Toy Museum (Malay: Muzium Mainan Melaka) is a private museum about toy collections in Bukit Baru, Malacca, Malaysia. It is the second toy museum opened in Malaysia after Penang Toy Museum.

The museum was originally established along Jonker Walk in 2009. However, due to its less strategic location at the back of a building and high rental cost, it was then moved to its current location in a single-story bungalow building at Bukit Baru in October 2011.

The museum displays the Hulk figure at its rooftop over the main entrance, and inside, it displays contemporary movie toy figures and old vintage toys. Over 10,000 objects are included from franchises such as Star Wars, Pirates of the Caribbean, The Lord of the Rings, Batman, X-Men, Spider-Man, Iron Man, Bruce Lee, Looney Tunes, The Smurfs, Godzilla, Ultraman, Hamtaro, Pokémon, and Doraemon. While some of the toys were purchased directly from local stores in Malacca and Kuala Lumpur, others were bought online or donated by visitors.

== See also ==
- List of museums in Malaysia
- List of tourist attractions in Malacca
- Penang Toy Museum
