= Saint Petersburg Toy Museum =

Toy museum in Saint Petersburg, Russia

Coordinates: 59°58′11″N 30°18′01″E

- Санкт-Петербу́ргский музе́й игру́шки
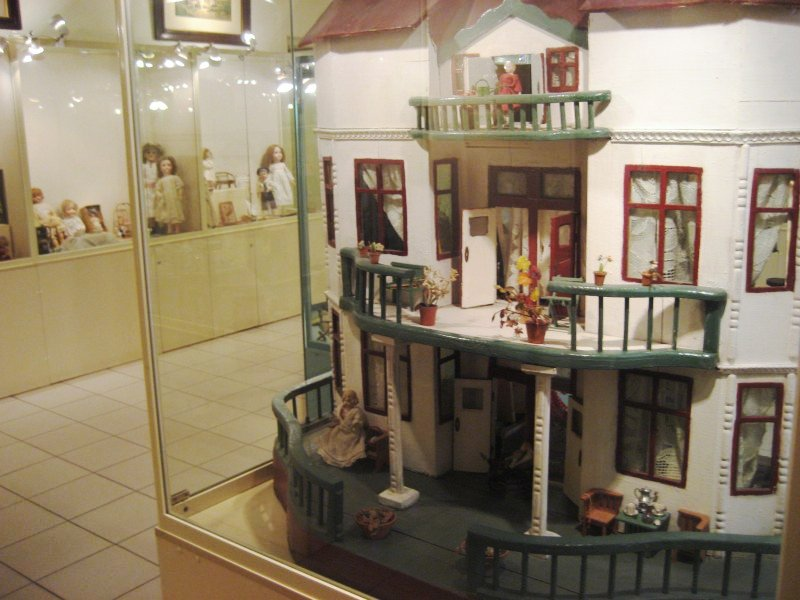
- Saint Petersburg Toy Museum (Russia). Inside View
- Established: 1997
- Location: Saint Petersburg, Russia
- Type: Toy museum
- Collection size: Artistic toys, folk toys, fabric toys

Saint Petersburg Toy Museum (Russian: Санкт-Петербу́ргский музе́й игру́шки) is a non-state cultural establishment.

== History ==
The Saint-Petersburg Toy Museum is a member of the Union of Museums of Russia. It was established in 1997 as a non-state cultural establishment, subsidised by private companies. It is the second museum of toys in Russia after the oldest artistic-educational museum of that kind in Sergiev Posad near Moscow, which treats pedagogic problems mainly.

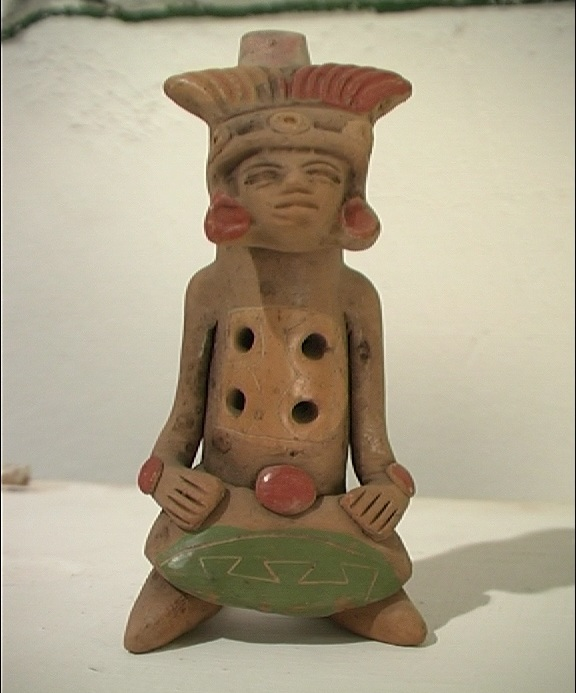
Folk toy in the St. Petersburg Toy Museum (Russia)

The Saint-Petersburg Toy Museum was established as an artistic museum with the main task of collecting, storing, exposing and studying toys not only as a unique item of material culture, but also as a unique art form, that includes ancient national traditions and the most recent artistic tendencies.

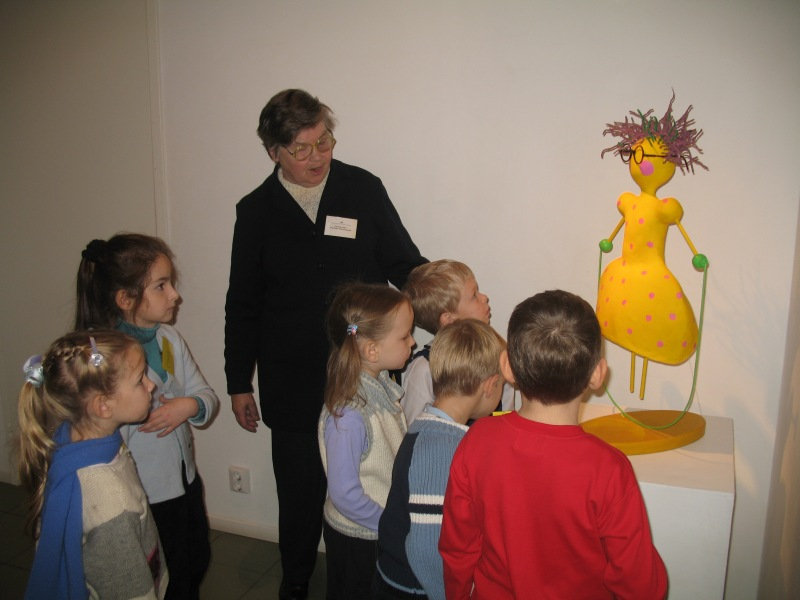
The guide and children in the St. Petersburg Toy Museum (Russia)

The toy as an art form, existing as both a functional play-thing and an aesthetic object, inspired the collection.

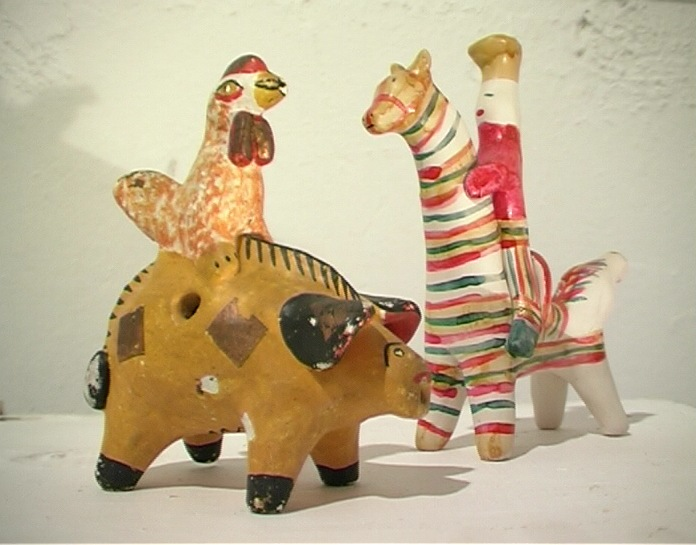
Whistles-Toy in the St. Petersburg Toy Museum (Russia)

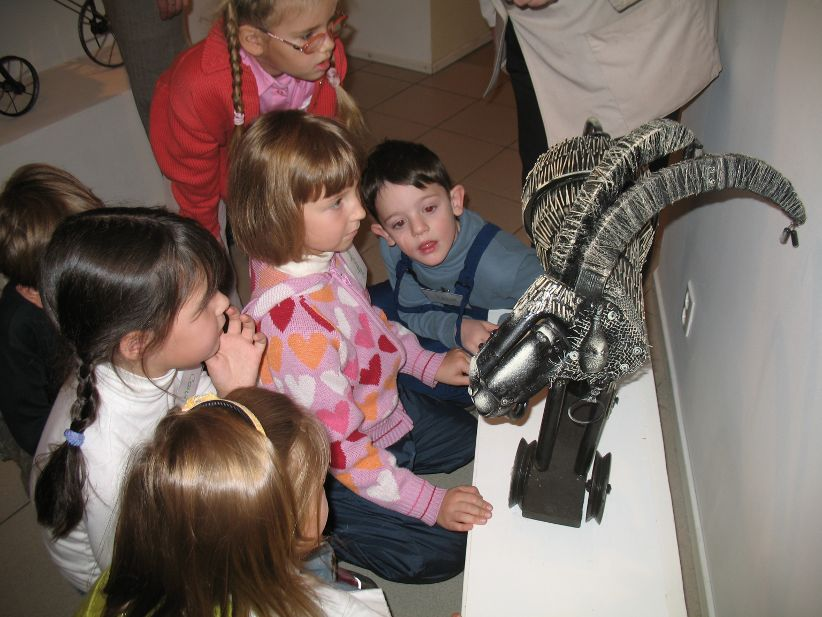
Children in the St. Petersburg Toy Museum (Russia)

However artistic toys are not the only direction of activity of the Saint-Petersburg Museum. The museum has collections of folk toys (both the Russian and foreign) and fabric toys, which are being permanently increased.

Having united artists, art critics and pedagogues around it, the Saint-Petersburg Museum takes part in working out interesting exhibition programs and artistic festivals, orientated on a broad age diapason of participators and visitors.

The Museum is not aimed purely at children, and works with other institutions to teach educational programmes.

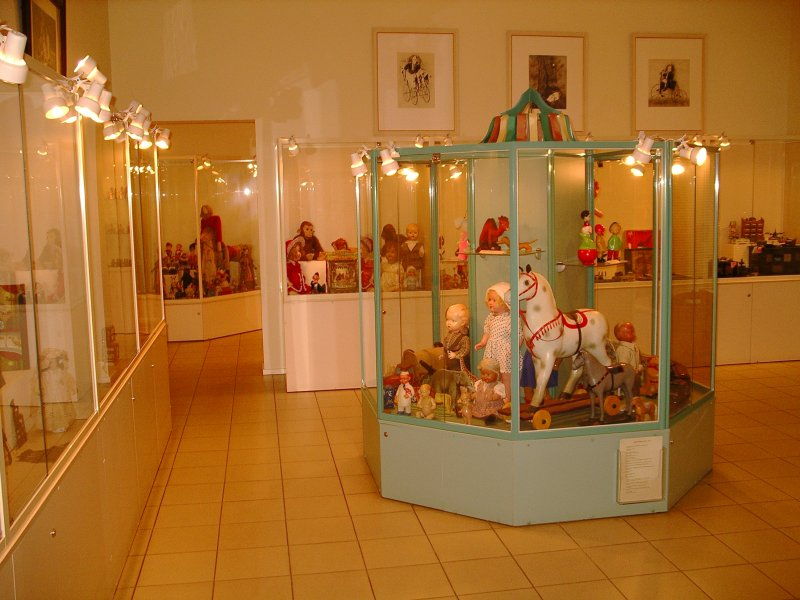
The exhibits in the St. Petersburg Toy Museum (Russia)

== Russian artists working in the genre of toys ==
- Oleg Buryan
- Katya Medvedeva

== See also ==
- List of museums in Saint Petersburg
