= ESCI =

ESCI may refer to:

- Ente Scambi Coloniali Internazionali, a company
- European Society for Clinical Investigation
- Engineering Staff College of India
- Emerging Sources Citation Index
