= Ertl Company =

American toy company

- Type: Private (1946–1999)
- Founded: 1945; 81 years ago Dubuque, Iowa, U.S.
- Founder: Fred Ertl Sr.
- Fate: Acquired by Racing Champions in 1999, currently a brand
- Headquarters: Dyersville, Iowa, U.S.
- Products: Die-cast scale model cars, commercial vehicles
- Owner: Takara Tomy
- Subsidiaries: AMT; Britains; ESCI; MPC
- Website: us.tomy.com/ertl

Ertl (formerly, the Ertl Company) is a former American manufacturing company and current brand of toys, best known for its die-cast metal alloy collectible replicas (or scale models) of agricultural machinery. Other products manufactured by Ertl include cars, airplanes, and commercial vehicles.

The company was based in Dyersville, Iowa, home of the National Farm Toy Museum.

== History ==
Ertl has been producing farm toy replicas since 1945. For over 60 years, the company has produced farm toys for industry brands such as: John Deere, Case IH, New Holland, and AGCO. Ertl has also, on different occasions, acquired the licenses to produce die-cast vehicles and figurines as well as model kits for Looney Tunes, Garfield, Thomas the Tank Engine & Friends, Tugs, Theodore Tugboat, Super Mario Bros. DC Comics, and Star Wars. In 1999, Ertl was purchased by Racing Champions. Ertl is currently a brand under the RC2 Corporation umbrella.

=== Timeline ===
Important Dates in Racing Champions/Ertl Company History

- 1945 - The Ertl Company is founded by Fred Ertl Sr., in Dubuque, Iowa
- 1959 - The company moves to larger facilities in Dyersville, Iowa
- 1967 - Ertl is acquired by Victor Comptometer Corporation
- 1971 - Ertl acquires Carter Tru-Scale
- 1973 - Ertl begins manufacturing plastic model kits
- 1974 - Ertl acquires Structo Stamped Steel
- 1977 - Kidde, Inc. acquires Ertl with purchase of Victor Comptometer Corp
- 1981 - Ertl acquires AMT model kit company
- 1985 - Ertl acquires MPC model kits
- 1986 - Ertl produces Thomas & Friends licensed toys
- 1987 - Hanson plc purchases Kidde. Ertl acquires ESCI model kit company
- 1989 - Racing Champions is founded by Bob Dods, Boyd Meyer and Peter Chung
- 1990 - Ertl releases the first Precision Series farm toy replica
- 1991–92 - Racing Champions obtains NASCAR license
- 1992 - Fred Ertl Jr. & Robert J. Ertl retire
- 1995 - Hanson plc consolidates its U.S. companies to form U.S.I. (United States Industries)
- 1993 - Ertl begins the Wings Of Texaco die cast airplane collection
- 1996 - Racing Champions introduces its Mint line of non-racing vehicles. Racing Champions Corporation is formed
- 1997 - Racing Champions completes its initial public stock offering (RACN on NASDAQ)
- 1999 - Company produces a commercial version of the Eternity puzzle
- 1999 - Racing Champions acquires The Ertl Company
- 2000 - Ertl acquires Britains Limited
- 2003 - Racing Champions Ertl acquired Chicago-based Learning Curve International, Inc.
- 2004 - RC2 Corporation acquired Playing Mantis assets and The First Years Inc., while the Thomas & Friends range was discontinued.
- 2008 - Round 2 LLC signs licensing agreement to produce and market AMT, MPC, Polar Lights, and 1:24 and 1:18 scale diecast
- 2009 - Ertl celebrates 50 years in Dyersville, Iowa
- 2010 - Ertl celebrates its 65th Anniversary
- 2011 - Tomy acquired RC2; maintains control of Ertl, Racing Champions and Johnny Lightning tooling
- 2012 - Round 2 LLC acquires full rights to AMT, MPC, Polar Lights tooling
- 2013 - Tomy discontinues Johnny Lightning brand
- 2015 – Round 2 LLC obtains the rights to use Racing Champions, American Muscle and ERTL Custom and Premium tooling
- 2016 – Round 2 LLC obtains the rights to use Johnny Lighting tooling
- 2018 – The son of Fred Ertl sells Die-cast Promotions (DCP) company to First Gear Inc. - https://www.firstgearonline.com/shop/dcp
- 2020 - Tomy reintroduces Johnny Lightning brand

== Products ==
=== Plastic model kits ===
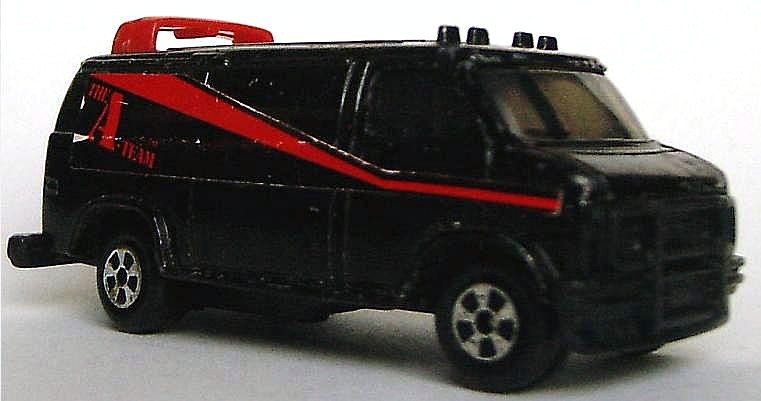
A-Team GMC van

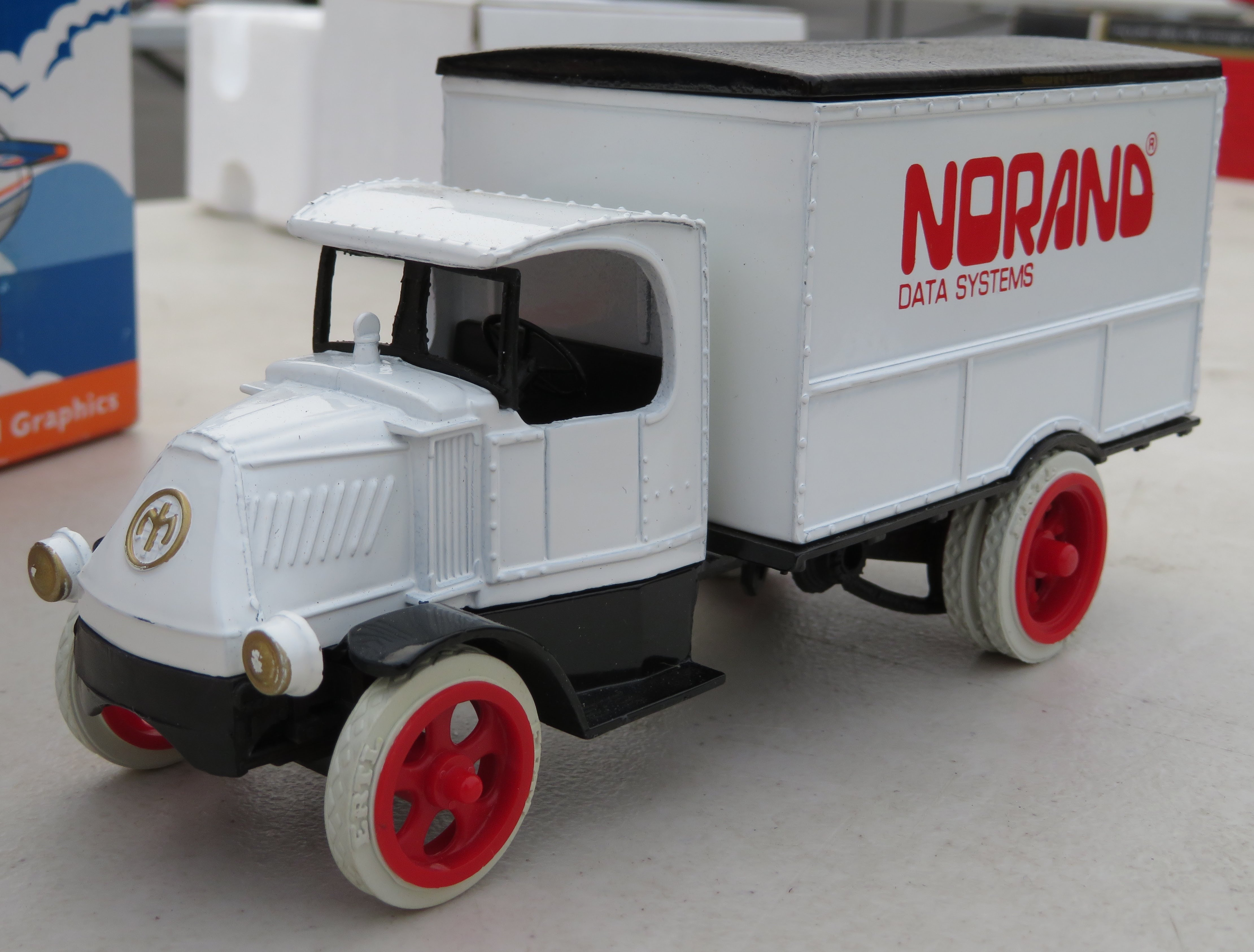
1926 Mack truck

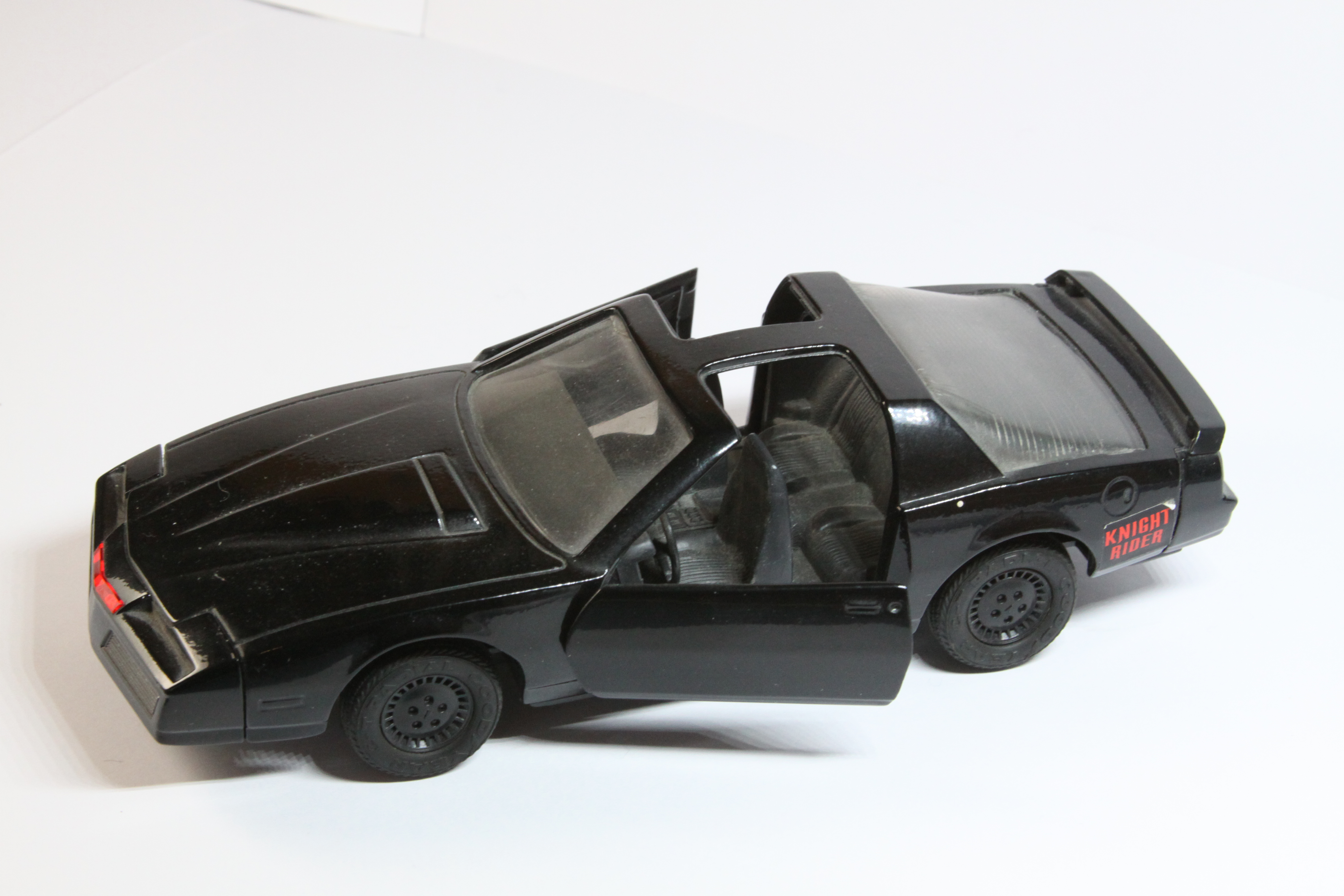
Knight Rider's KITT

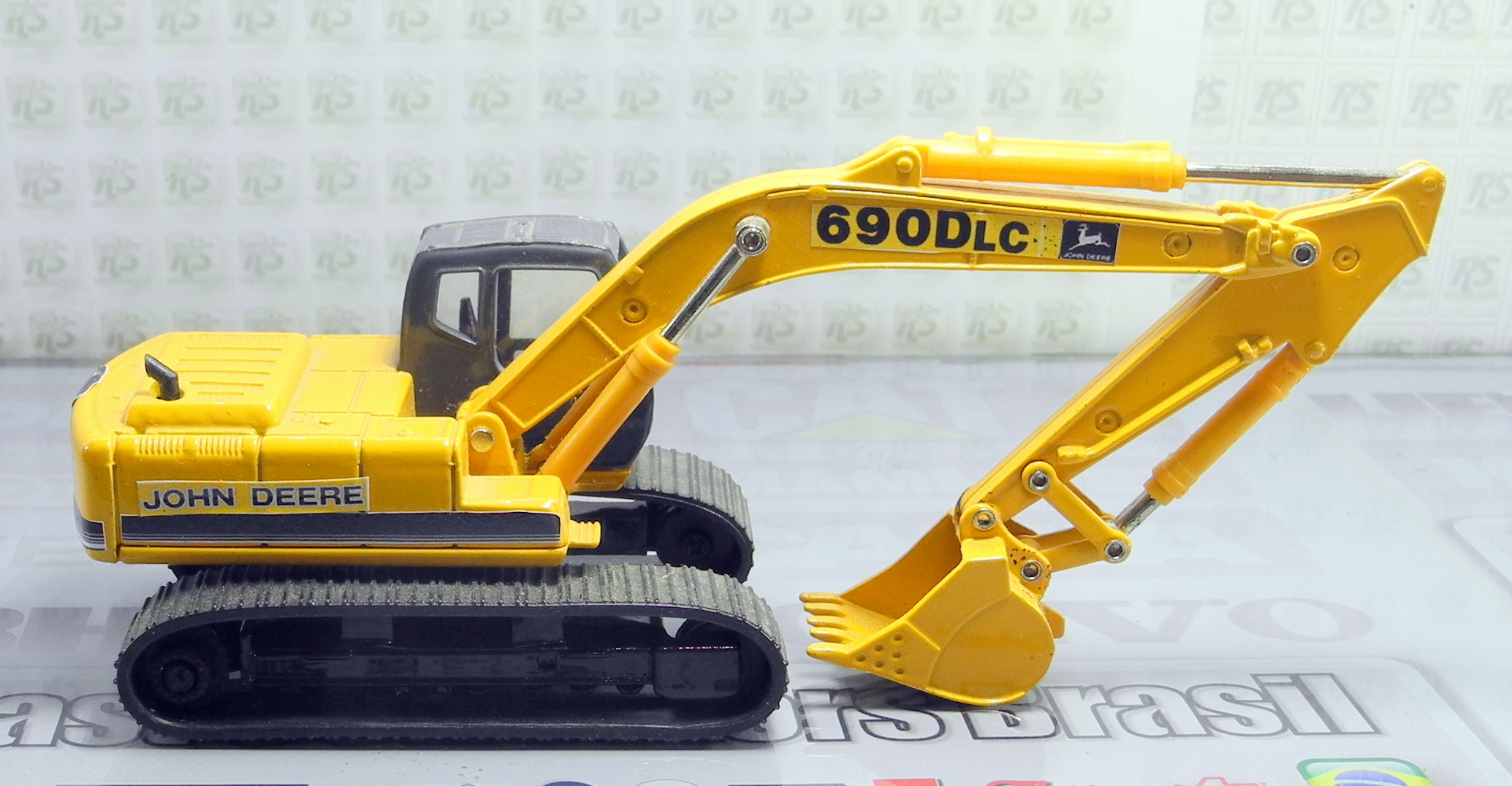
John Deere excavator

In the late 1970s, Ertl offered a series of plastic model kits of heavy commercial trucks, over-the-road trailers, tractors, plows, and farm wagons. Although these kits never achieved the hoped-for popularity, they led to the acquisition of AMT. In 1983, AMT was purchased by Ertl from Lesney, and renamed AMT/Ertl. AMT/Ertl then had a 24-year relationship until AMT was sold in 2007.

=== Movies and TV franchises ===
In the 1980s, Ertl got licenses to produce and commercialise model cars from movies and TV series, such as KITT from the Knight Rider and the Bat-vehicles from the 1989 Batman film. They would also make a multitude of action figures and vehicles for the 1993 Super Mario Bros. movie.

=== American Muscle diecast ===
In the early 1990s Ertl started the American Muscle line up of diecast collectible cars, trucks, and motorcycles. These were 1:18 or 1:10 scale replicas that quickly found a dedicated following of baby boomers. Limited editions of 2,500 were especially sought after. Many of the earliest releases have fetched upwards of $500. The most popular and desirable is the 1957 Chevy Bel Air known as Peggy Sue.

=== Airplanes ===
Ertl has also produced a number of die cast airplane models over the years, including some promotional items for Texaco, Continental and many other airlines and others.

== See also ==
- Bumble Ball
- Thomas & Friends merchandise#Ertl Company
