= National Farm Toy Museum =

Coordinates: 42.471°N 91.110°W

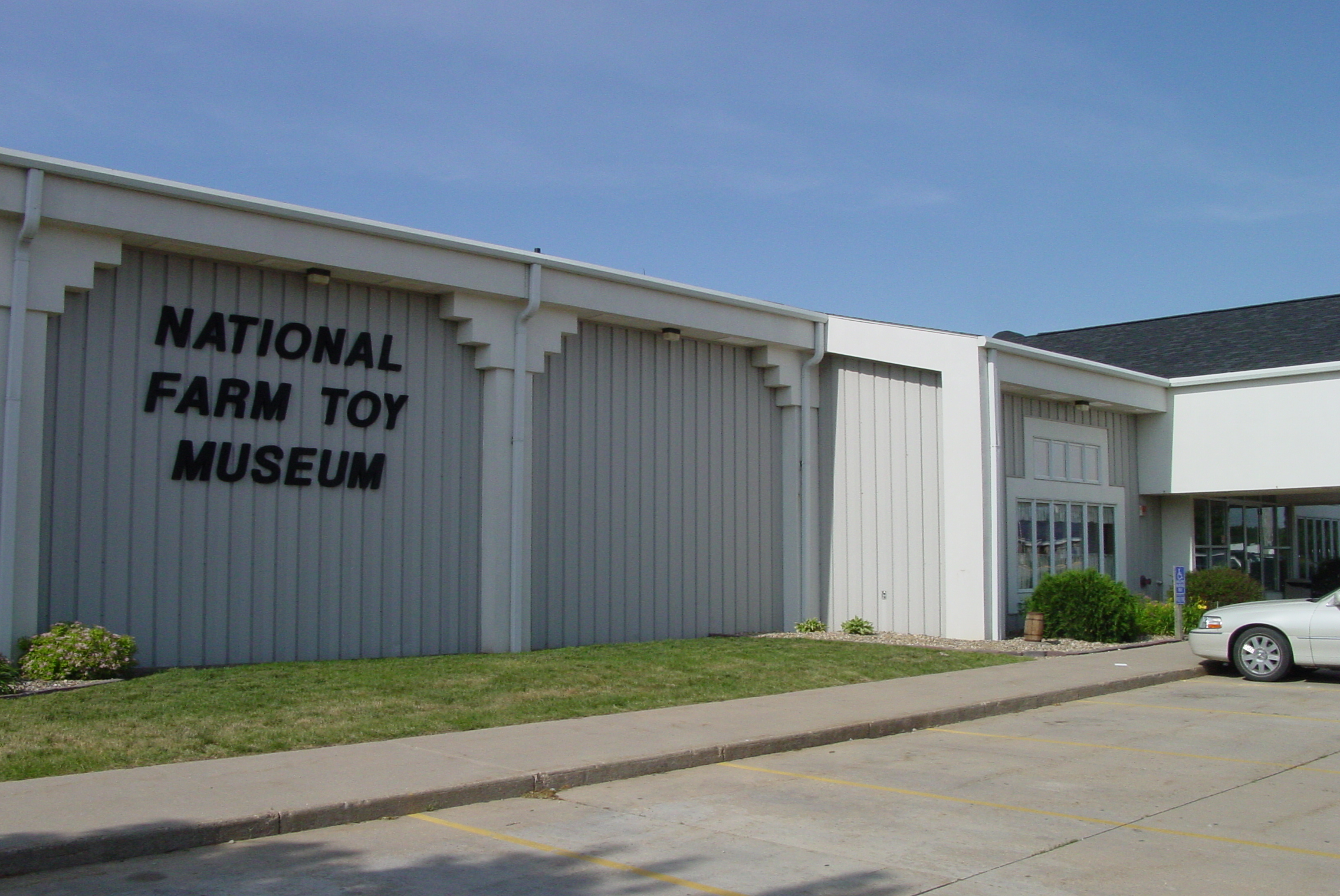
- Established: 1986
- Location: 1110 16th Ave Ct SE; Dyersville, Iowa, USA
- Type: Toy museum
- Website: nationalfarmtoymuseum.com

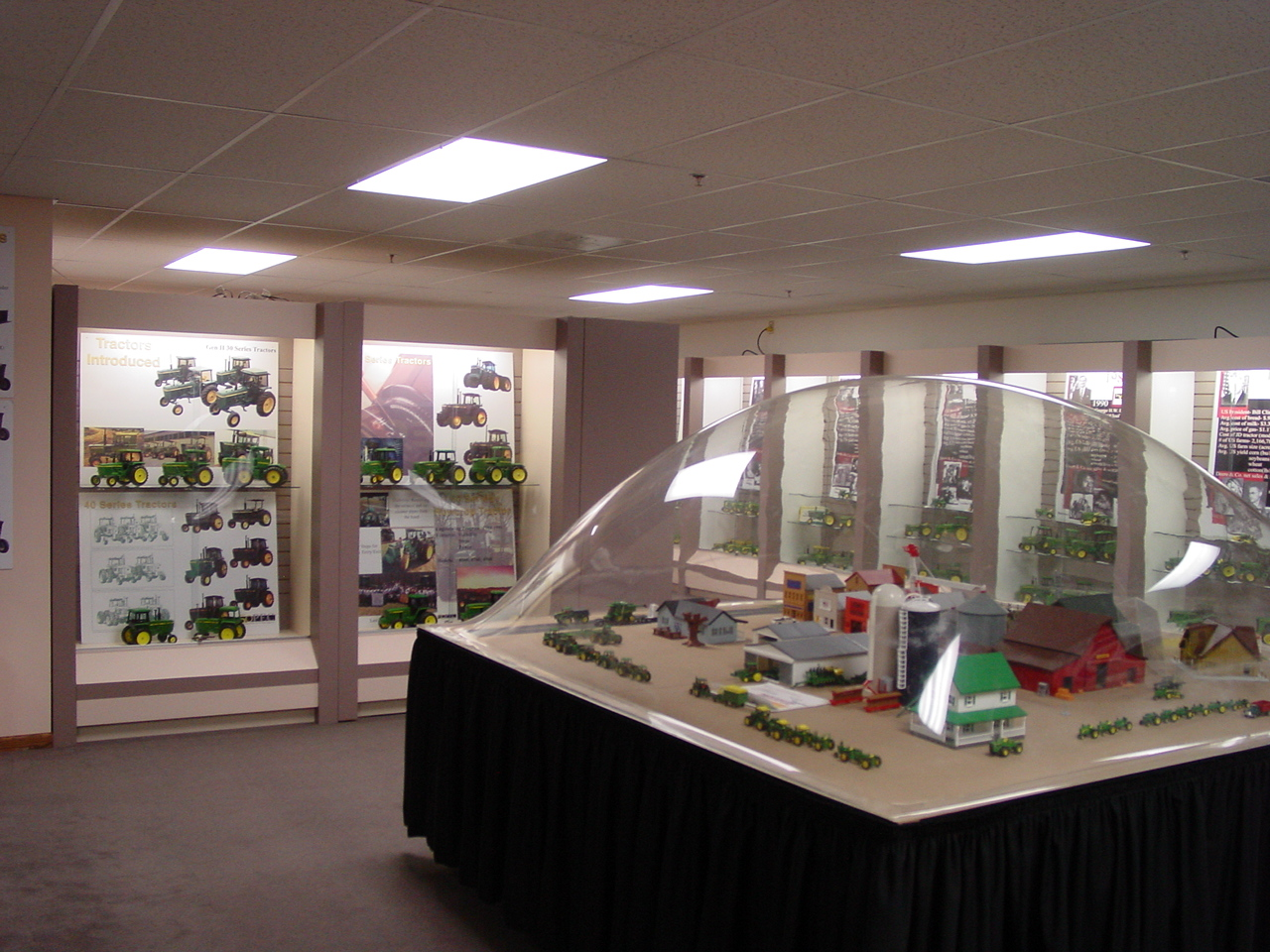
Thousands of farm toys are displayed inside the museum

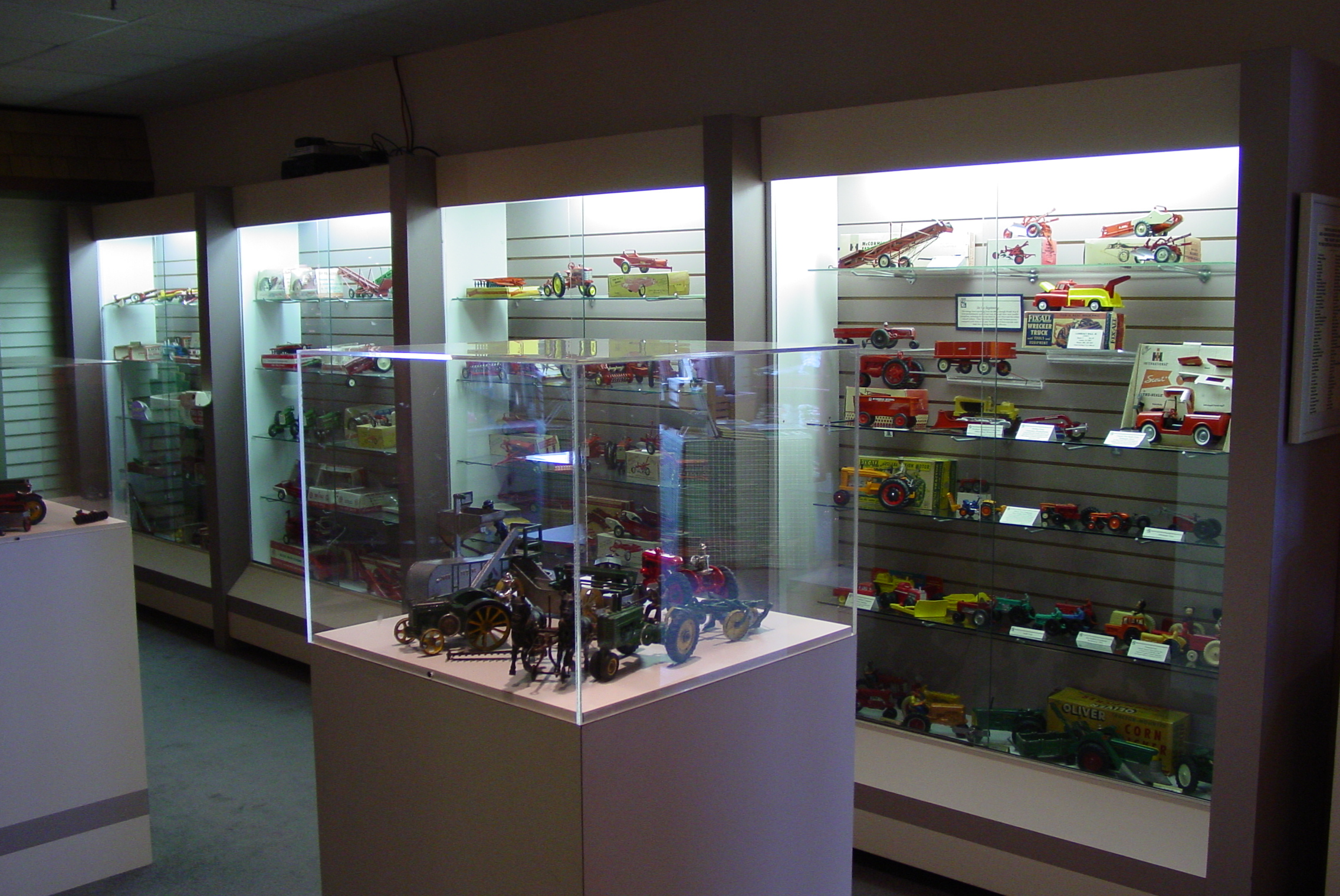
The history of farming is demonstrated by the various farm toys

The National Farm Toy Museum is a museum located in Dyersville, Iowa, that specializes in preserving and displaying scale models, replicas, and toys based on farm equipment. The initial idea of the museum came from the founders of the Ertl Company, Dave Bell and Claire Scheibe.

== History ==
The National Farm Museum was founded in 1986; the founding of the museum arose from a discussion between Dave Bell and Claire Scheibe about needing a bigger space for the coming National Farm Toy Shows.

== Present ==
The museum has over 30,000 guests each year and about 30,000 farm toys; it is also the center of the National Farm Toy Show. The National Farm Toy Museum includes one of the largest collections of cast iron farm toys. The museum is a part of yearly toy shows in June and November. The first floor of the museum has a 10-minute short film for guests to watch, about toy production in Dyersville and farm toy aficionados talking about their collections. The floor also includes a play area, dioramas of farm homesteads, and small exhibits that detail how toys are produced. The second floor has many farm toys stored in cases, truck toys in cases, and a collection of cowboy and Native American dolls. The museum also houses a gift shop. Ertl CEO Fred Ertl Jr.'s personal farm toy collection was auctioned off at the National Farm Toy Museum after he retired. Thanks in part to the museum, but also to the fact that three farm toy companies are located in Dyersville, the city is known as the Farm Toy Capital of the World.

== Toy shows ==
First started in 1978, the National Farm Show includes a tractor parade, garage sales, antique tractors, antique farm machinery, and a farm toy show that is both inside and outside. The first show had 35 vendors and over 1,500 people shopping. The museum also hosts the Midwest Toy Truck Show, which is smaller than the national show.

== Reception ==
The author Ernest W. Baker went to the farm where the film Field of Dreams was filmed, but his main purpose was to visit the farm toy museum and Lonely Planet describes the museum as "quirky".
