= Allen House (Dyersville, Iowa) =

Historic house in Iowa, United States

- U.S. National Register of Historic Places
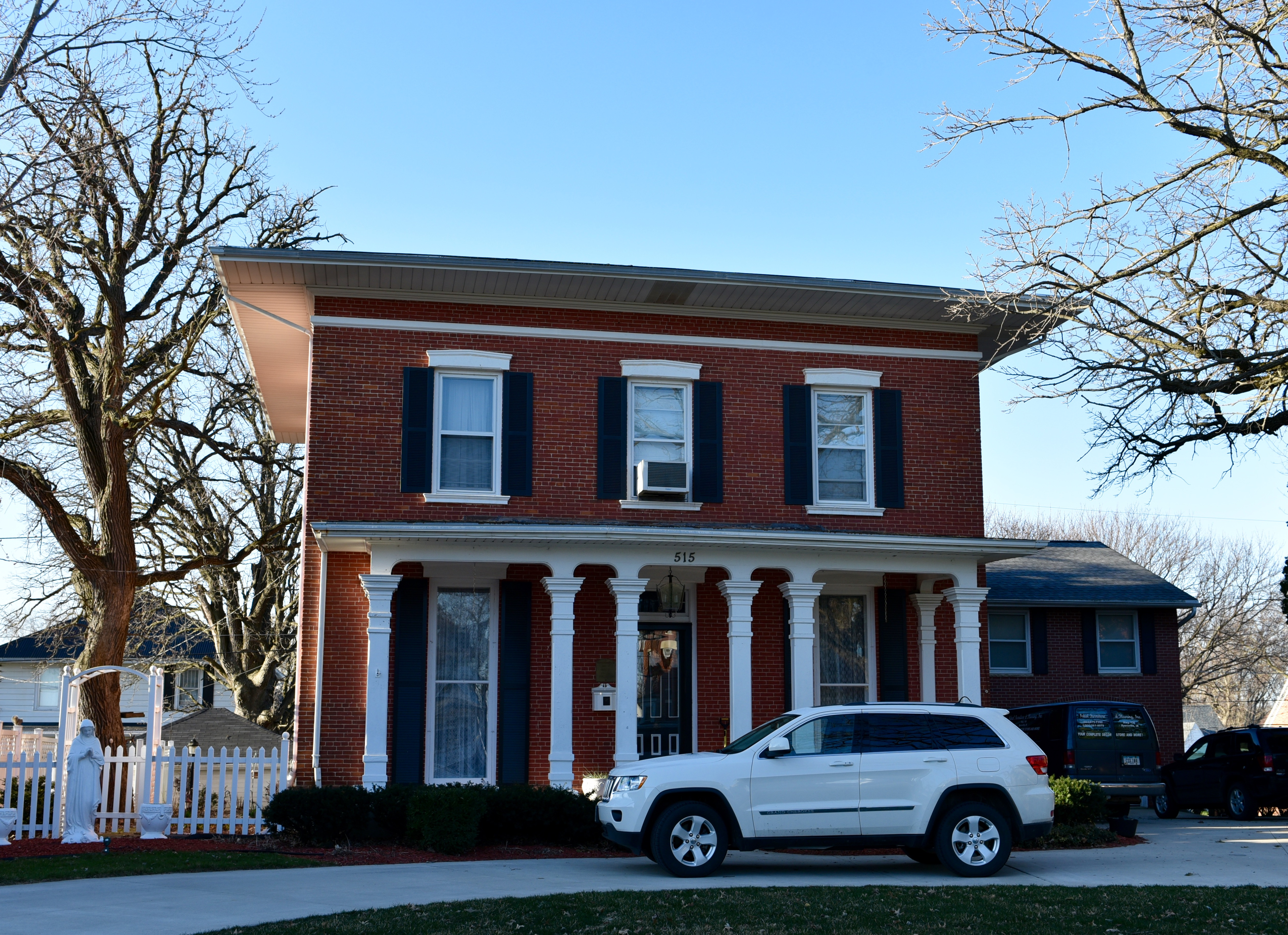

- Location within Iowa Location within the United States
- Location: 515 1st Ave., W. Dyersville, Iowa
- Coordinates: 42°29′03″N 91°07′50.5″W
- Area: less than one acre
- Built: 1857
- Architectural style: Italianate; Federal
- NRHP reference No.: 75000686
- Added to NRHP: July 10, 1975

The Allen House is a historic building located in Dyersville, Iowa, United States. T.F. Allen was a land speculator and developer who had this house built in 1857, which was the peak year for building in Dyersville. That year the town was the terminus of the Dubuque and Pacific Railway. Thirty houses were built in the town that year, and others were under contract. Within a year, the railroad had expanded further west, and the town was in an economic depression exacerbated by the Panic of 1857. There is no mention of Allen or his family in Dyersville in the 1860 United States census.

The two-story brick house exhibits elements of both the Italianate and Federal styles. It features a low-pitched hip roof, broad eaves without brackets, Federal influenced metal lintels on each window, a transom above the main doorway, and nearly full-sized front porch with heavy square wood posts. A two-story wing was added onto the back in the early 20th-century, and a carriage house was built about the same time. The house was listed on the National Register of Historic Places in 1975.
