= Bumble Ball =

Motorized toy

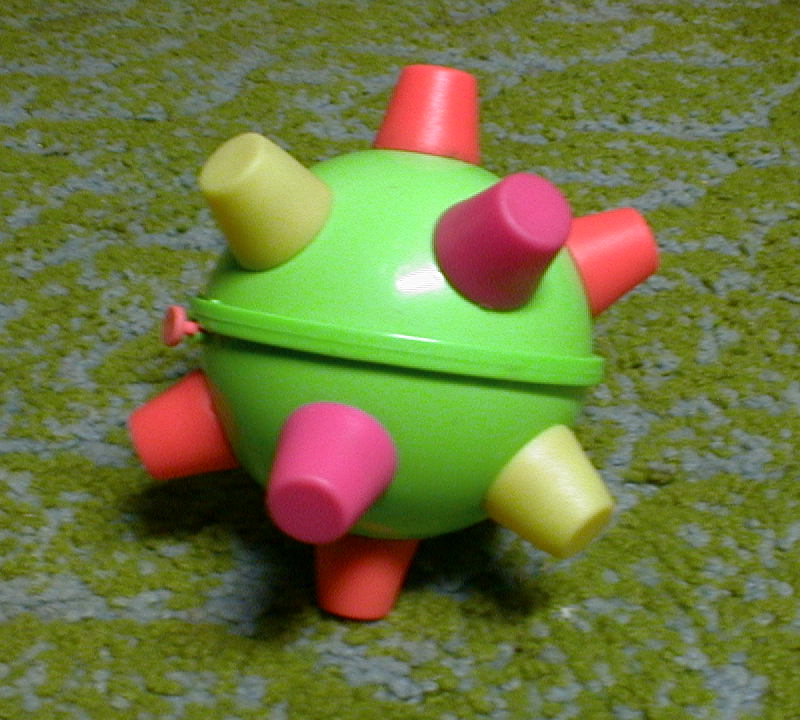
A green Bumble Ball on carpet

The Bumble Ball is a motorized toy made by Ertl toys. The toys were popular in the mid 1990s and come in varied colors, including a see-through light-up one and a mini version. Some are available in key clip form under the name Bumble Ball Jr. Variations were produced by Ertl such as the Bumble Ball Bolter, a colorful insect-like toy with several long legs, a head with synthetic blue hair, and a Bumble Ball torso.

The toy is powered by a motor box with batteries mounted eccentrically. Its power switch consists of a knob that starts the motor when pushed in and stops the motor when pulled out. This causes it to vibrate and bounce about. The core of the Bumble Ball is hard plastic while the knobs are a softer rubber texture.

Silver Bumble Balls were seen in Michael Jackson's 1995 music video for his single, "Scream". Despite fan requests, this special ball was never made available to the public.

Since their early popularity in the 1990s, the Bumble Ball concept has been used by Fisher-Price. This has led to products more directly aimed toward toddlers such as a Mr. Potato Head-like toy and animal variations. These small versions use a pull-string to activate the vibration rather than a switch as featured on larger models.

In 2006 on Animal Planet, footage of a dog (possibly an Irish Setter) with a Bumble Ball in its mouth has become a running gag where the host Keegan-Michael Key or the announcer would call it a "Jowl Jiggler".
