= Dyersville, Iowa =

- City
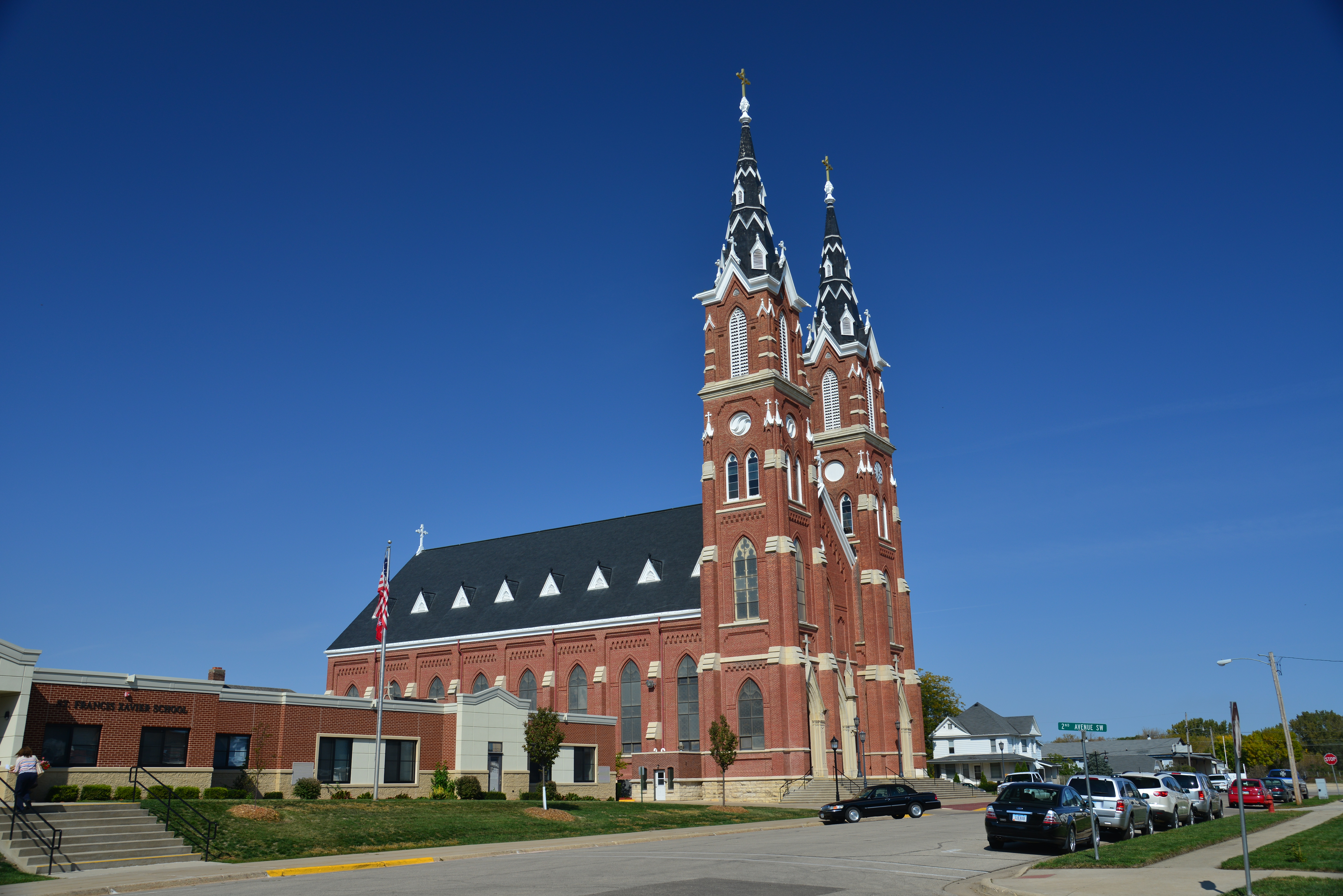
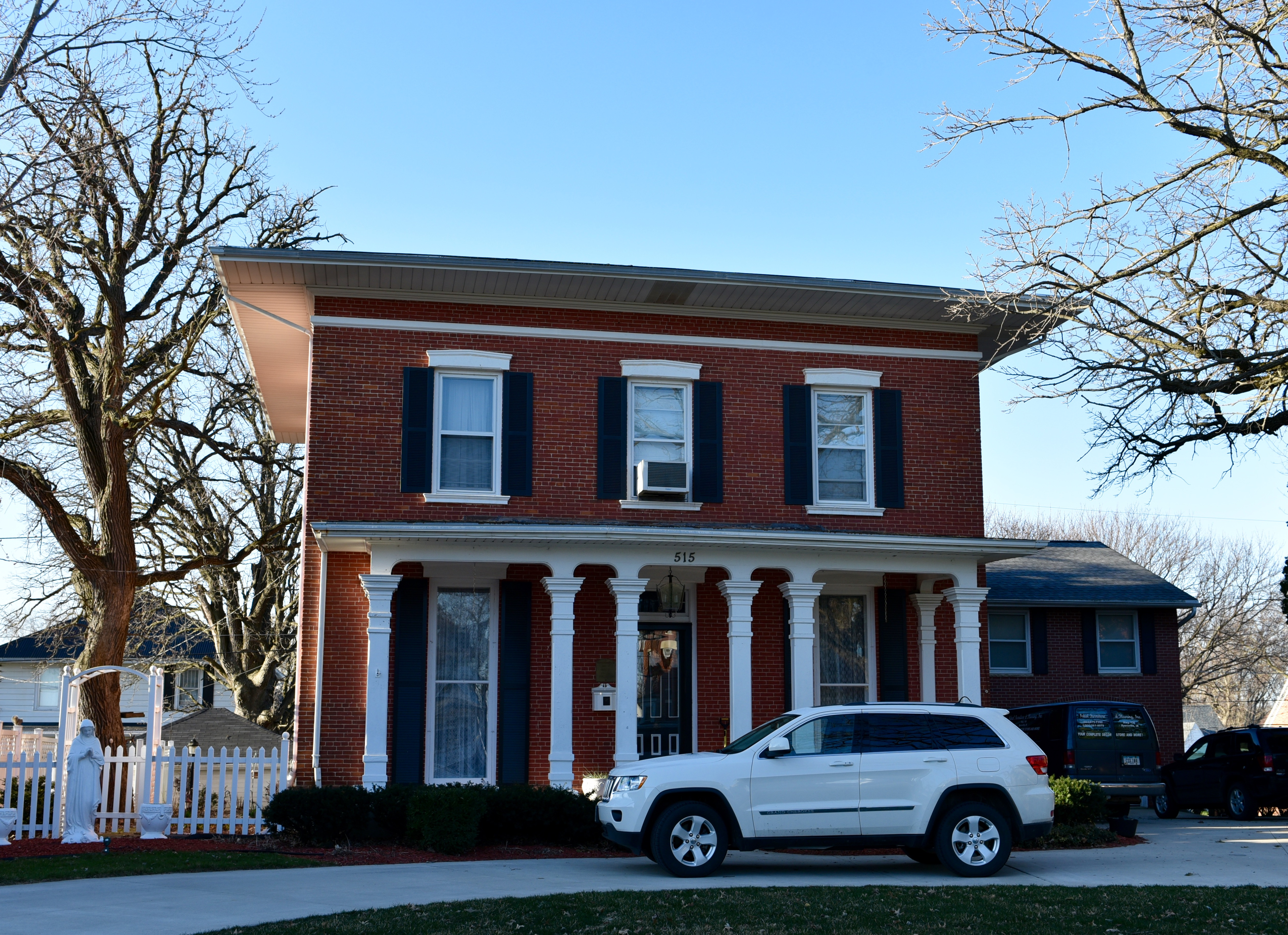
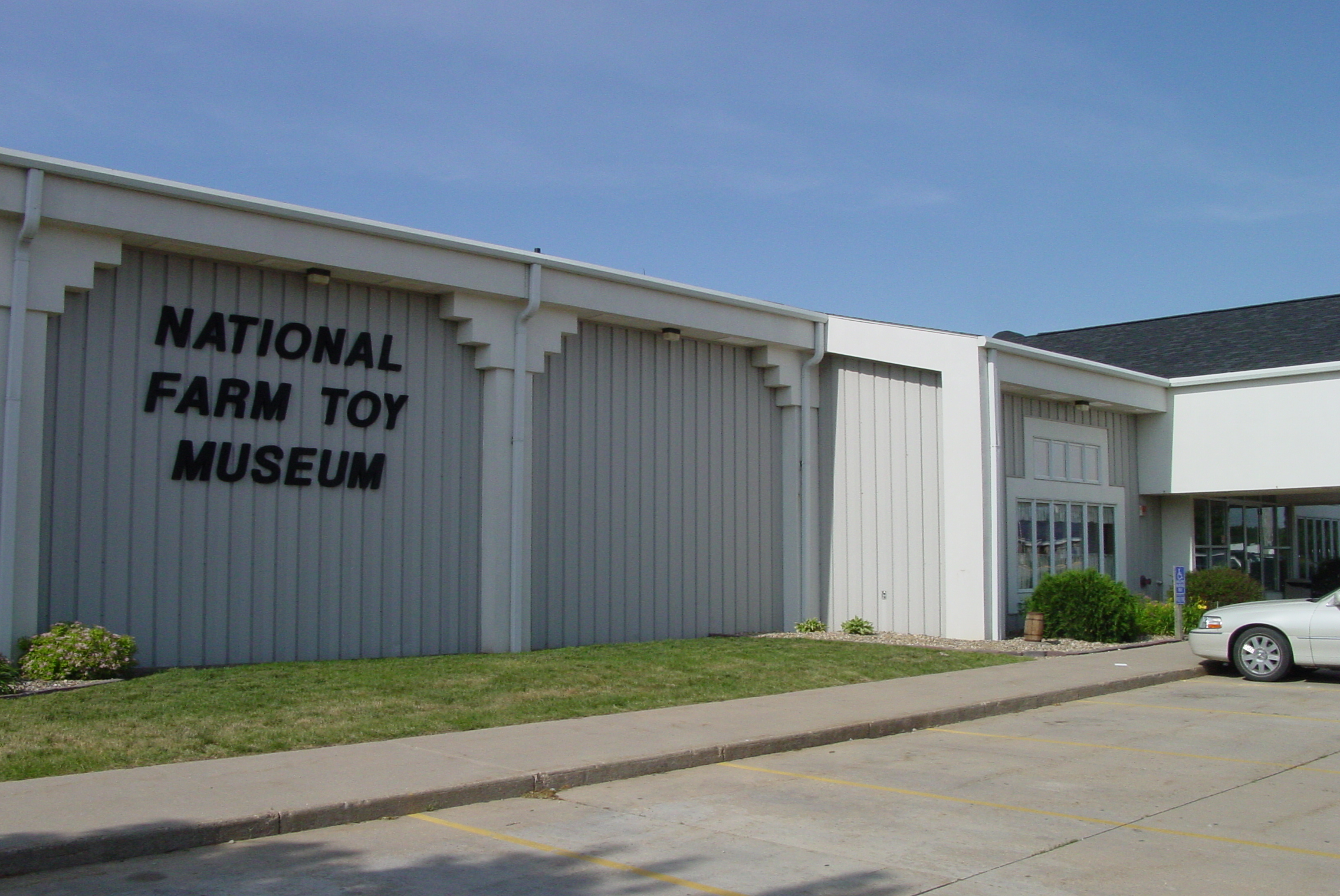
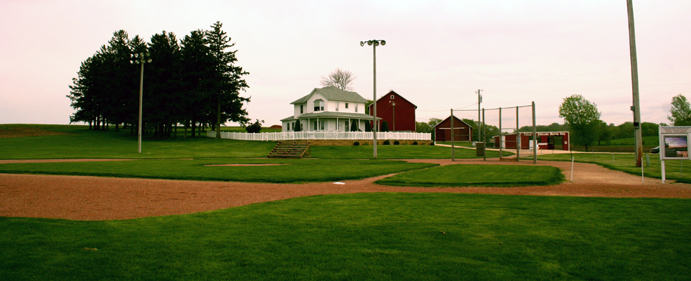
- Basilica of St. Francis Xavier Allen House National Farm Toy Museum Field of Dreams

- Location in Dubuque County and Iowa
- Coordinates: 42°29′23″N 91°06′15″W
- Country: United States
- State: Iowa
- Counties: Dubuque, Delaware

Area
  - Total: 6.90 sq mi (17.86 km^{2})
  - Land: 6.85 sq mi (17.74 km^{2})
  - Water: 0.046 sq mi (0.12 km^{2}) 0.18%
- Elevation: 968 ft (295 m)

Population (2020)
  - Total: 4,477
  - Density: 653.8/sq mi (252.42/km^{2})
- Time zone: UTC-6 (CST)
  - Summer (DST): UTC-5 (CDT)
- ZIP code: 52040
- Area code: 563
- FIPS code: 19-23115
- GNIS feature ID: 2394584
- Website: cityofdyersville.com

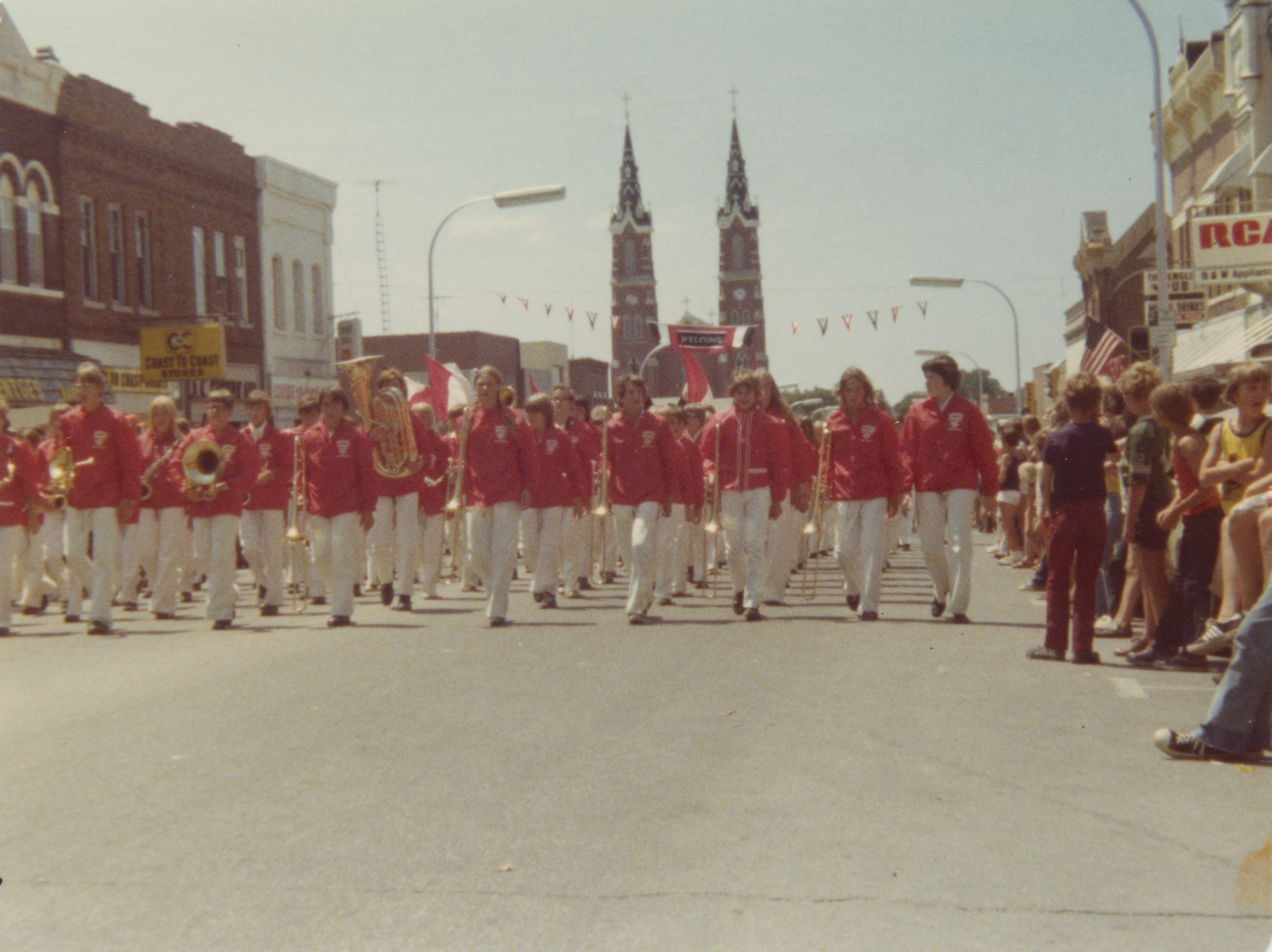
Western Dubuque High School marching band, Dyersville, Iowa

Dyersville is a city in eastern Delaware County and western Dubuque County in the U.S. state of Iowa. It is part of the Dubuque, Iowa, Metropolitan Statistical Area. The population was 4,477 at the time of the 2020 census, up from 4,035 in 2000. Dyersville is known as the home of the Field of Dreams movie site, the National Farm Toy Museum, and the Basilica of St. Francis Xavier.

== History ==
Dyersville was laid out in 1851. It was named for early landowner James Dyer (1820–1864). Dyer immigrated from Banwell, England and established a hotel, The Clarendon, in 1857. His sons, James Andrew Dyer, with 6th Iowa Cavalry Regiment and Henry Andrew Dyer, with 21st Iowa Infantry Regiment, served in the American Civil War.

== Field of Dreams ==
The 1989 movie Field of Dreams was filmed at a farm near Dyersville. The ballpark, now named for the movie, hosted the Major League Baseball game between the Chicago White Sox and the New York Yankees (broadcast live as MLB at Field of Dreams) on August 12, 2021. (It had been scheduled for 2020, but was postponed due to the COVID-19 pandemic.) The park hosted additional games in the Field of Dreams series between the Chicago Cubs and the Cincinnati Reds on August 11, 2022, and between the Philadelphia Phillies and the Minnesota Twins on August 13, 2026.

== Attractions ==
- The Basilica of St. Francis Xavier, one of the few minor Roman Catholic basilicas in the United States outside a large metropolitan area.
- The Ertl Company as well as an outlet store.
- The National Farm Toy Museum.

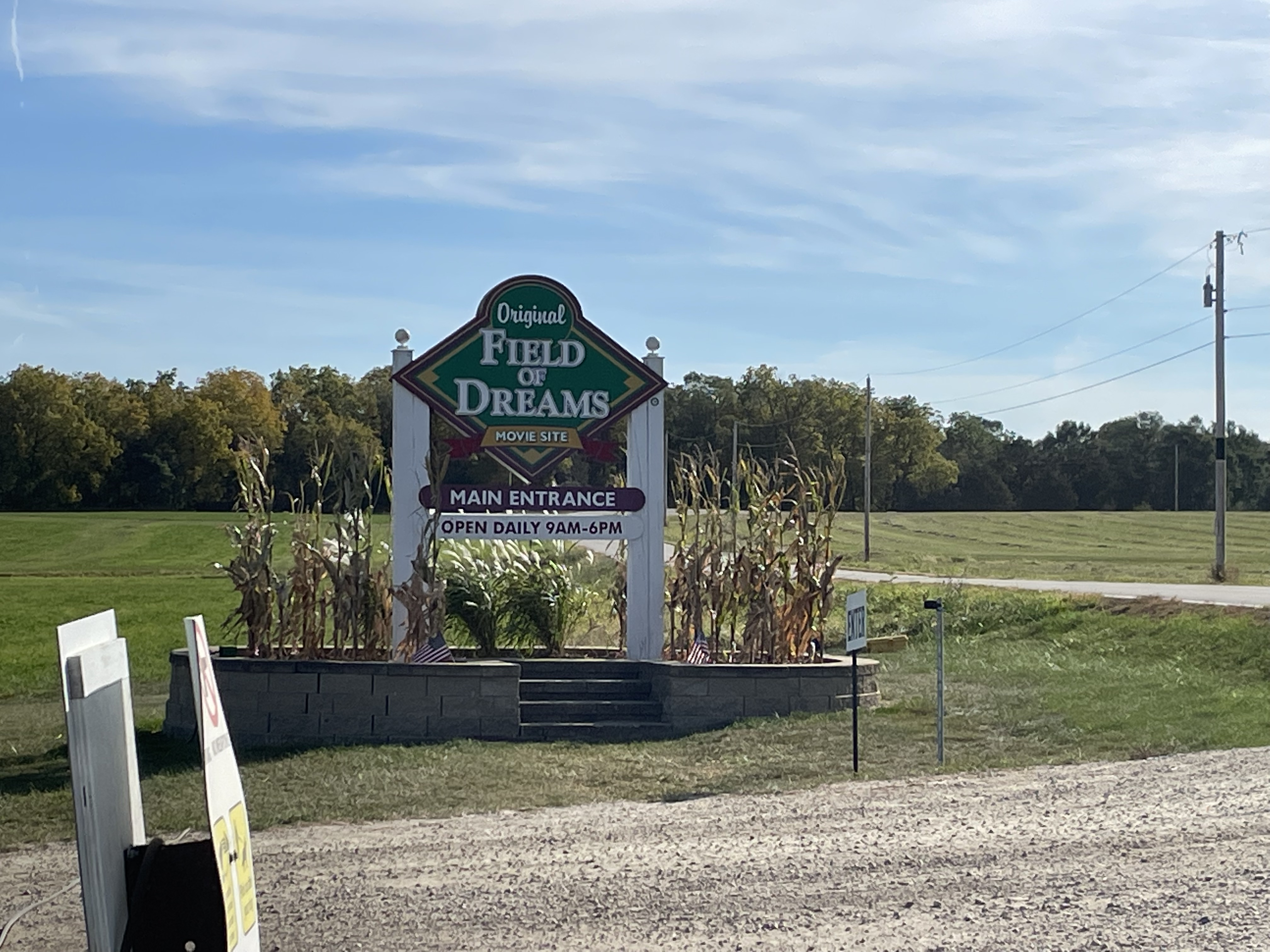
The entrance to the Field of Dreams Movie Site

== Geography ==
Dyersville is located along the North Fork of the Maquoketa River.

According to the United States Census Bureau, the city has a total area of 5.64 square miles (14.61 km^{2}), of which 5.63 square miles (14.58 km^{2}) is land and 0.01 square miles (0.03 km^{2}) is water.

== Demographics ==
Population history of Dyersville, Iowa (1940–2006).

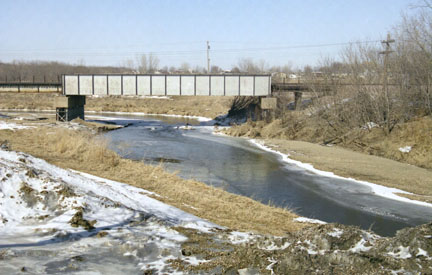
The North Fork of the Maquoketa River at Dyersville in 1996

Historical populations
Year	Pop.	±%
1880	975	—
1890	1,272	+30.5%
1900	1,323	+4.0%
1910	1,511	+14.2%
1920	1,933	+27.9%
1930	2,046	+5.8%
1940	2,138	+4.5%
1950	2,416	+13.0%
1960	2,818	+16.6%
1970	3,437	+22.0%
1980	3,825	+11.3%
1990	3,696	−3.4%
2000	4,035	+9.2%
2010	4,058	+0.6%
2020	4,477	+10.3%
Source:"U.S. Census website". United States Census Bureau. and Iowa Data Center; Source: U.S. Decennial Census

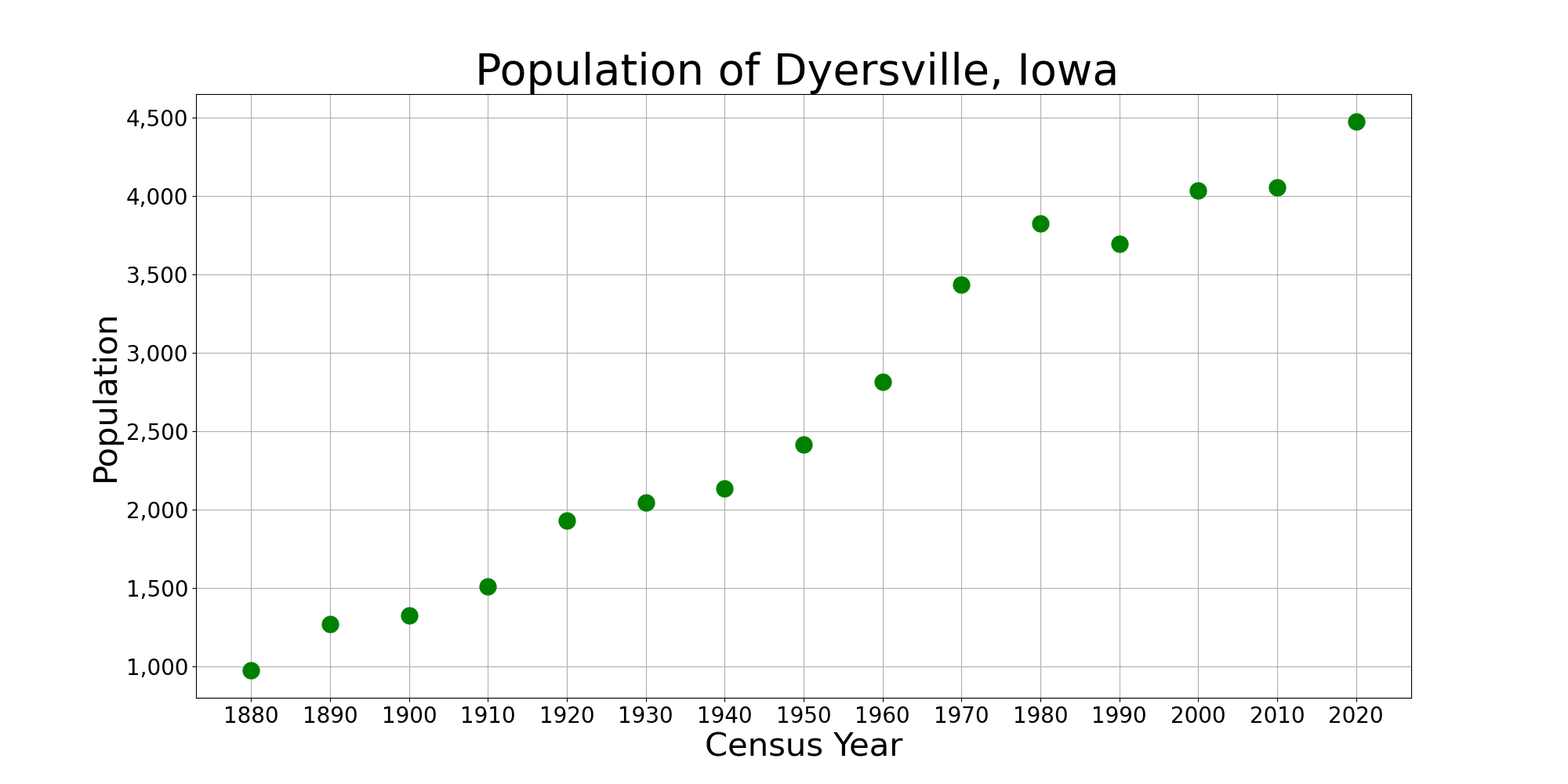
The population of Dyersville, Iowa from US census data

=== 2020 census ===
As of the 2020 census, Dyersville had a population of 4,477 people, with 1,840 households and 1,183 families. The median age was 40.4 years. The population density was 653.8 inhabitants per square mile (252.4/km^{2}), and there were 1,956 housing units at an average density of 285.6 per square mile (110.3/km^{2}).

Of the population, 24.6% of residents were under age 18 and 20.3% were age 65 or older. By broader age groups, 26.8% were under age 20, 4.8% were from age 20 to 24, 23.0% were from age 25 to 44, and 25.0% were from age 45 to 64. The gender makeup was 48.8% male and 51.2% female; for every 100 females there were 95.3 males, and for every 100 females age 18 and over there were 91.0 males age 18 and over.

There were 1,840 households, of which 29.2% had children under the age of 18 living in them. Of all households, 53.5% were married-couple households, 5.6% were cohabiting couple households, 16.8% were households with a male householder and no spouse or partner present, and 24.0% were households with a female householder and no spouse or partner present. About 35.7% of households were non-families, 30.4% were made up of individuals, and 14.1% had someone living alone who was 65 years of age or older.

Of the 1,956 housing units, 5.9% were vacant. The homeowner vacancy rate was 2.4% and the rental vacancy rate was 9.1%. 0.0% of residents lived in urban areas, while 100.0% lived in rural areas.

Racial composition as of the 2020 census
Race	Number	Percent
White	4,139	92.5%
Black or African American	105	2.3%
American Indian and Alaska Native	5	0.1%
Asian	13	0.3%
Native Hawaiian and Other Pacific Islander	9	0.2%
Some other race	92	2.1%
Two or more races	114	2.5%
Hispanic or Latino (of any race)	154	3.4%

=== 2010 census ===
At the 2010 census there were 4,058 people, 1,700 households, and 1,102 families living in the city. The population density was 720.8 inhabitants per square mile (278.3/km^{2}). There were 1,808 housing units at an average density of 321.1 per square mile (124.0/km^{2}). The racial makup of the city was 97.6% White, 0.9% African American, 0.2% Asian, 0.4% from other races, and 0.8% from two or more races. Hispanic or Latino of any race were 1.3%.

Of the 1,700 households 29.4% had children under the age of 18 living with them, 55.3% were married couples living together, 6.5% had a female householder with no husband present, 3.0% had a male householder with no wife present, and 35.2% were non-families. 29.9% of households were one person and 14.2% were one person aged 65 or older. The average household size was 2.36 and the average family size was 2.94.

The median age was 40.6 years. 24.6% of residents were under the age of 18; 6.7% were between the ages of 18 and 24; 24.4% were from 25 to 44; 24.6% were from 45 to 64; and 19.6% were 65 or older. The gender makeup of the city was 48.5% male and 51.5% female.

=== 2000 census ===
At the 2000 census there were 4,035 people, 1,578 households, and 1,117 families living in the city. The population density was 878.1 inhabitants per square mile (339.0/km^{2}). There were 1,669 housing units at an average density of 363.2 per square mile (140.2/km^{2}). The racial makup of the city was 98.71% White, 0.45% African American, 0.17% Pacific Islander, 0.12% Asian, 0.05% from other races, and 0.50% from two or more races. Hispanic or Latino of any race were 0.45%.

Of the 1,578 households 35.4% had children under the age of 18 living with them, 61.0% were married couples living together, 7.8% had a female householder with no husband present, and 29.2% were non-families. 25.7% of households were one person and 13.2% were one person aged 65 or older. The average household size was 2.52 and the average family size was 3.07.

28.0% are under the age of 18, 6.7% from 18 to 24, 29.1% from 25 to 44, 18.5% from 45 to 64, and 17.7% 65 or older. The median age was 36 years. For every 100 females, there were 91.2 males. For every 100 females age 18 and over, there were 88.8 males.

The median household income was $38,469 and the median family income was $45,625. Males had a median income of $29,674 versus $21,312 for females. The per capita income for the city was $17,195. About 4.6% of families and 4.8% of the population were below the poverty line, including 5.5% of those under the age of 18 and 8.4% of those 65 and older.

== Law and government ==
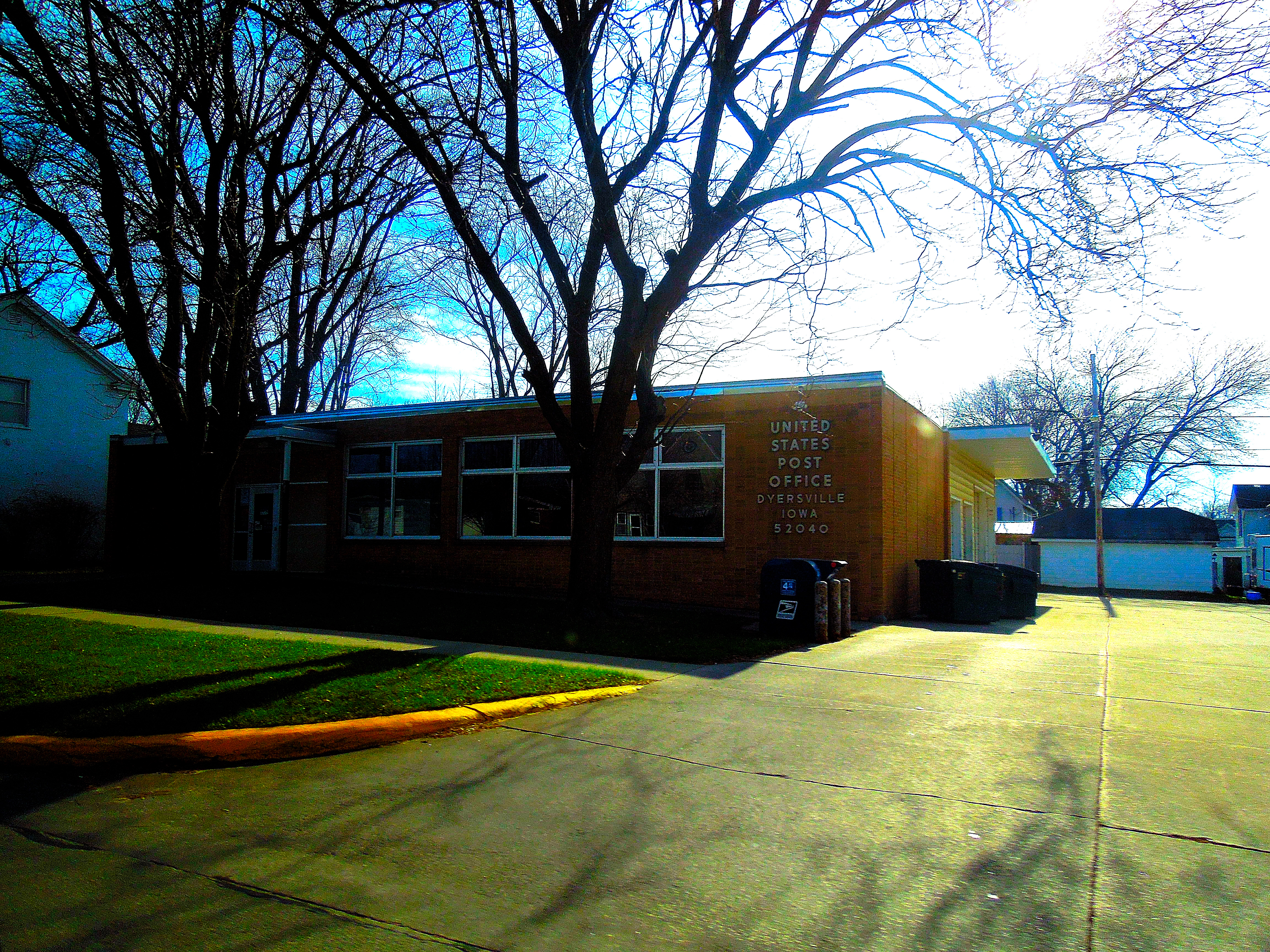
Dyersville Post Office

Dyersville's current mayor is Jeff Jacque. Dyersville is represented by Senator Pam Jochum (D-Dubuque) in the Iowa Senate, and Representative Shannon Lundgren (R-Peosta) in the Iowa House of Representatives. At the federal level, it is within Iowa's 2nd congressional district, represented by Ashley Hinson (R) in the U.S. House of Representatives. Dyersville, and all of Iowa, are represented by U.S. senators Chuck Grassley (R) and Joni Ernst (R).

The U.S. Postal Service operates the Dyersville Post Office.

== Education ==
=== Primary and secondary schools ===
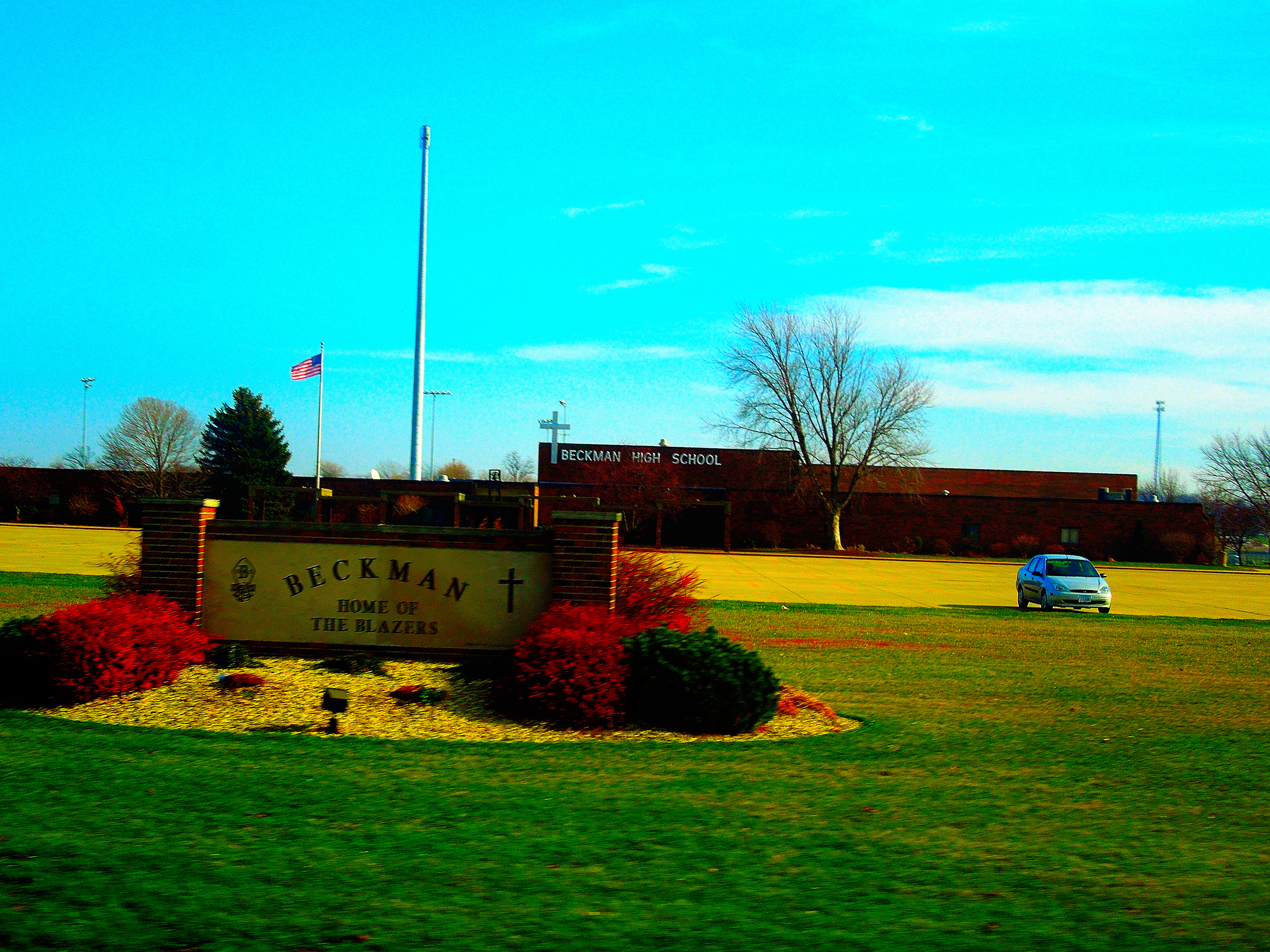
Beckman Catholic High School

All public school students living in Dyersville are zoned to schools in the Western Dubuque Community School District. Elementary school students attend Dyersville Elementary School (in Dyersville) for grades K-5. Dyersville Elementary opened in 2011. As of 2020 it has about 292 students. Middle school students are zoned to Drexler Middle School (in Farley), and high school students are zoned to Western Dubuque High School in Epworth.

Dyersville also has private schools. Parochial school students attend St. Francis Xavier Elementary School for grades PreK-6 (enrollment 420), then go to Beckman Catholic High School for grades 7-12 (enrollment 280), both of which are in Dyersville. These schools are affiliated with the Roman Catholic Church, and are a part of the Roman Catholic Archdiocese of Dubuque.

=== Public libraries ===
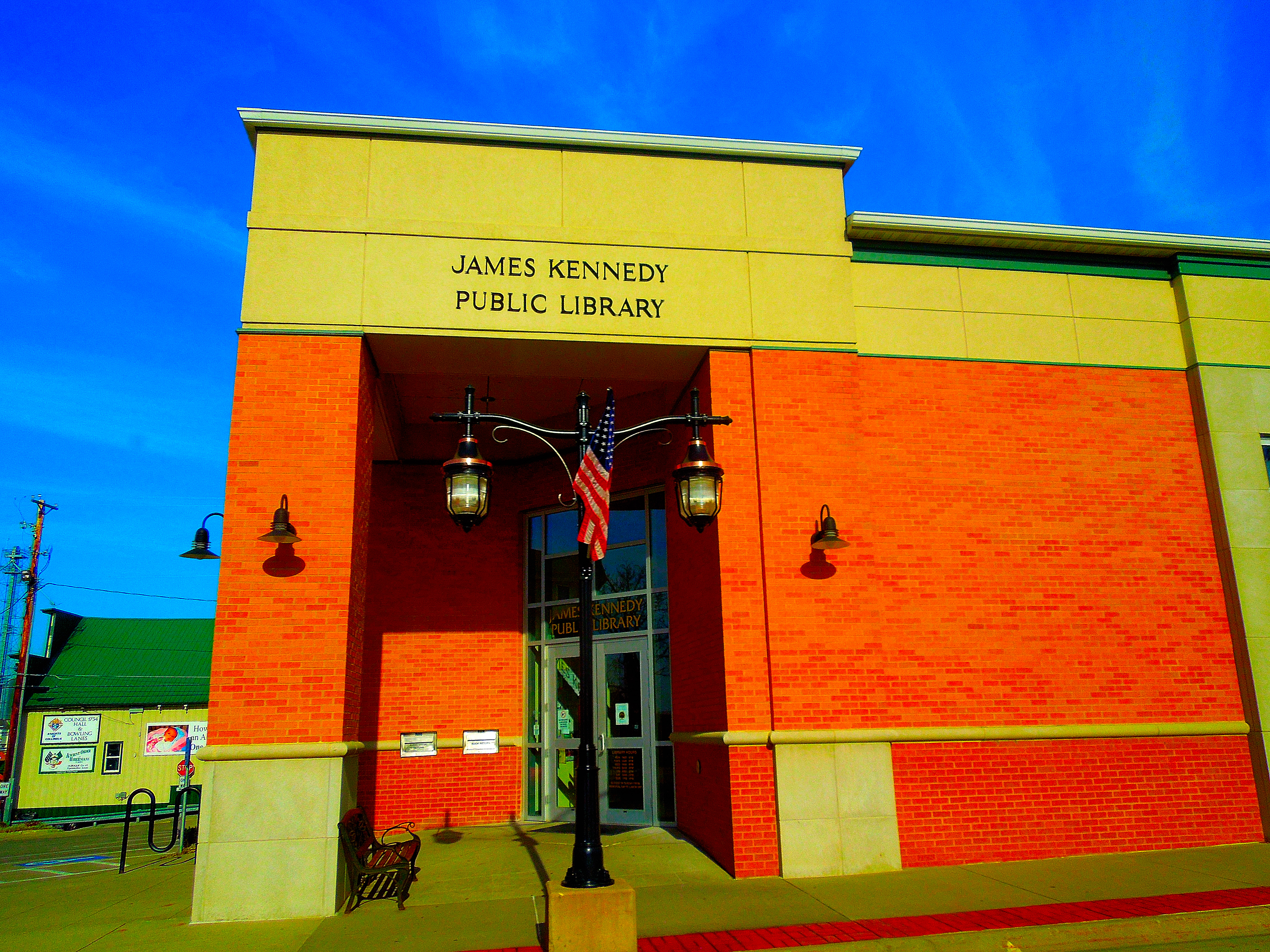
James Kennedy Public Library

The municipal public library is the James Kennedy Public Library. In 1956 the city council proposed a standalone library to replace the collection at city hall, and on September 11, 1959, it was dedicated. In 1970 a children's library area was placed in a former fire station. The current library was formally named after its benefactor on March 1, 2001, and broke ground on April 1, 2001.

== Economy ==
Dyersville is a farming city with a long history. It is nicknamed "The Farm Toy Capital of the World" because it hosts a farm toy show the first weekend in June and the National Farm Toy Show the first weekend in November. It is also the longtime home of the Ertl Company, a maker of die-cast farm toys. Multiple local businesses are based on this part of its economy.

== Largest employers ==
The nine largest employers (by number of employees) in descending order, as of 2016.

1. FarmTek - distributor of farm supplies and manufacturer of tension fabric buildings.
2. Modernfold - operable and moveable walls and folding doors.
3. Lumber Specialties - floor and roof trusses and wall panels.
4. Dyersville Die-Cast - custom manufacturer of zinc and aluminum die-casting, CNC machining, powder coating and scale model toys.
5. TOMY - branded toys, collectibles, hobby and infant products.
6. Spireon - mobile resource management.
7. BARD Materials - ready-mix concrete (e.g. lime, crushed rock, sand).
8. Mercy Medical Center - acute hospital services, nursing, nursing home, assisted and independent living facilities, physical therapy.
9. Beckman Catholic High School - grades 7–12.

== Notable people ==
- Rudolph Gerken (1887–1943), archbishop of the Archdiocese of Santa Fe
- Robert Osterhaus (born 1931), Iowa state representative
- George Strock (1911–1977), photojournalist
