= Basilica of St. Francis Xavier, Dyersville =

- Basilica of St. Francis Xavier, Church and Rectory
- U.S. National Register of Historic Places
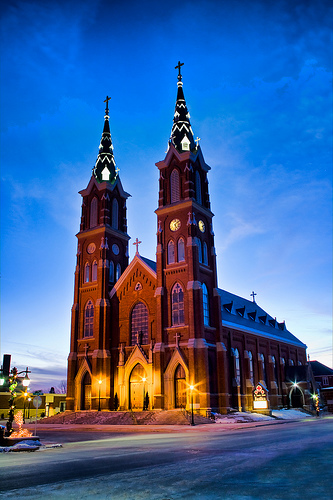
- The Basilica of St. Francis Xavier

- Location within Iowa Location within the United States
- Location: 114 2nd St. SW; Dyersville, Iowa
- Coordinates: 42.484440°N 91.126246°W
- Area: less than one acre
- Built: 1889
- Architect: Fridolin Heer and Son
- Architectural style: Neo-Gothic
- NRHP reference No.: 99001205
- Added to NRHP: September 29, 1999

The Basilica of St. Francis Xavier is a parish church in the Archdiocese of Dubuque located in Dyersville, Iowa, United States. The church was named in honor of the missionary Saint Francis Xavier. It was raised to the status of a minor basilica in 1956. The church and rectory were listed together on the National Register of Historic Places in 1999.

== History ==
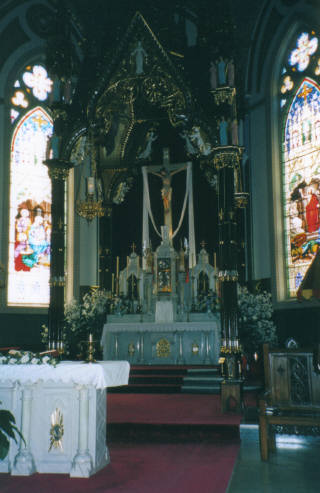
The Main Altar (foreground) and former High Altar (background)

Dyersville was originally settled by English immigrants. Within a few years the English moved on, and many German immigrants began to arrive in the area. A parish was founded to serve these immigrants in 1859. The first St. Francis Xavier Church was completed in 1862. The parish grew quickly and the church had to be doubled in size by 1869. By 1880, it became clear that with the increasing Catholic population of Dyersville and the surrounding area, the old church building would no longer be adequate.

A new church building program was begun in the mid-1880s. The parish decided on a large Gothic Revival style building in order to serve the increased population. Dubuque architects Fridolin Heer Sr. and his son Fridolin Heer Jr. designed the church. The priest at the time, Anton Kortenkamp (1834-1889), also had the foresight to have the altar placed upon a foundation of solid rock, which is one of the requirements for an altar to be consecrated. Construction was begun in 1887, and the cornerstone was laid on June 3, 1888. The new church was dedicated by Bishop John Hennessy on December 3, 1889. When the building was dedicated, special trains brought people from all over the state of Iowa to witness the ceremony. It cost approximately $100,000 to build the church. After the completion of the present building, the old church was converted into classrooms. It was later torn down after a new school was completed. Electric lights were added to the church in 1904.

The interior of the church is decorated with a number of paintings and frescoes. Much of this work was done by Milwaukee artists Clotilda and Alphonse Brielmaier from 1904 to 1905. Work to either touch-up the original frescoes or to partially cover some of them was done in 1930 and 1955.

The rectory was built to the west of the church in 1935. The 68-by-66-foot (21 by 20 m) brick residence contains 14 rooms. The rooms are a combination of private living space and offices. A. J. Osterhaus Construction of Dyersville was the contractor who built the rectory. A garage and a passageway connects it to the basilica.

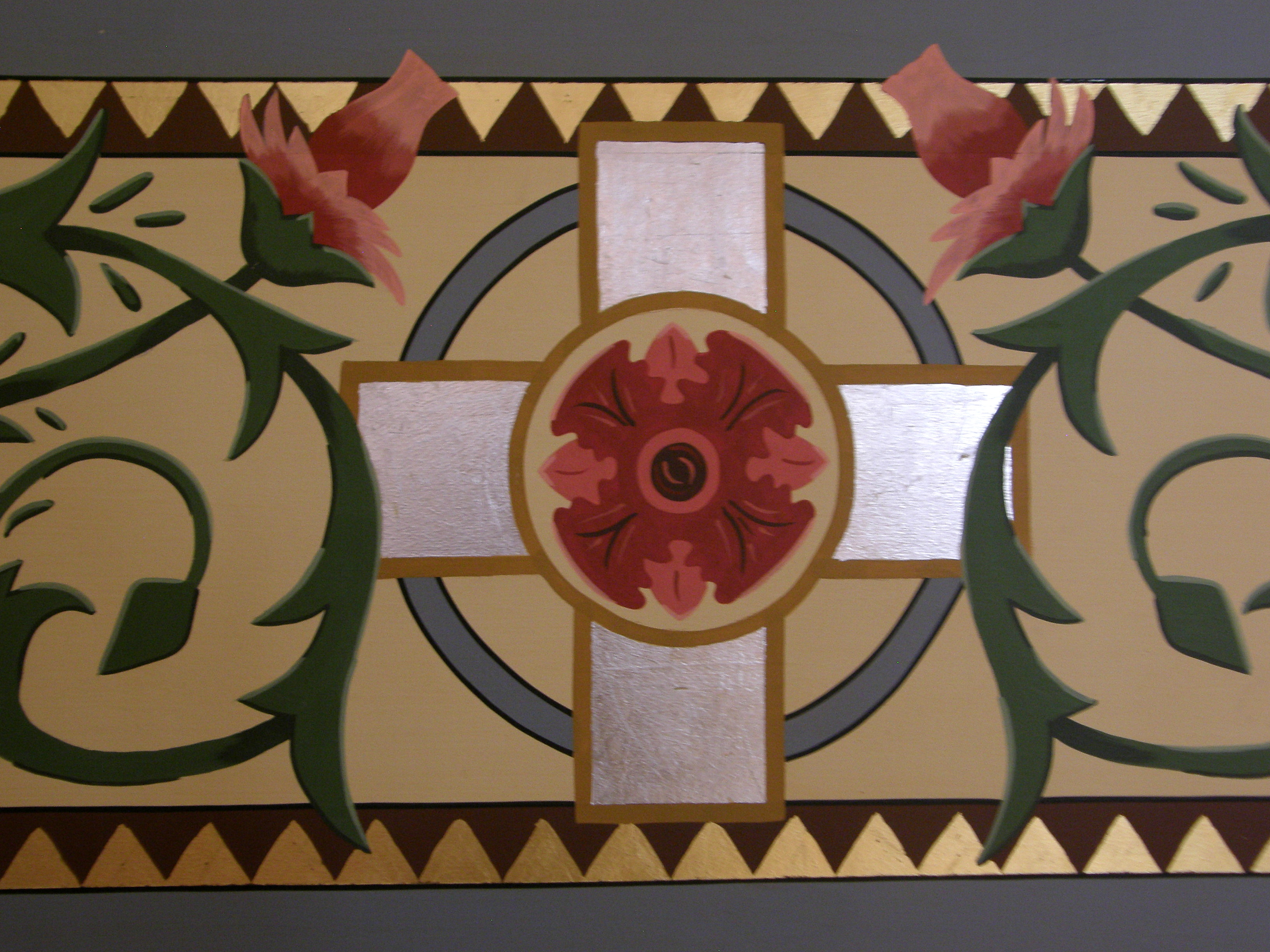
Wall fresco details

The move to elevate St. Francis Xavier to a minor basilica began in the 1940s. Then-Father Mathias M. Hoffman, who had served as a military chaplain in Europe in World War I and World War II, began to advance the cause to Vatican officials. The cause was furthered when a high ranking German Cardinal, Konrad von Preysing, visited the church. In the mid-1950s the church building was consecrated. On the interior there are a number of small gold crosses on the side walls, marking the twelve places where the church walls were anointed with chrism when the church was consecrated. Once consecrated a church building may never be used for any other purpose and only a consecrated church can be elevated to the rank of a basilica. Previously the parish had worked hard to attain and maintain a debt-free status, a preliminary requirement before a church can be consecrated.

On May 11, 1956, the church was elevated to the rank of a minor basilica by Pope Pius XII. It was the twelfth church in the United States to receive this honor. A mass officially naming the church as a basilica attracted crowds from all over the state, as well as many high ranking clergy.

An addition was made to the south side of the basilica in 1989. It contains a handicapped elevator, restrooms and access to the basement of the basilica.

In the mid-1990s, the parish began to offer a Tridentine Mass at 12:00 p.m. on Sundays. This Mass was either said or sung in Latin according to the 1962 Rite. Currently, the Noon Mass is offered in Spanish.

The interior of the church was refurbished from 2000 to 2001. The paintings and frescoes were cleaned. Other frescoes that were hidden under coats of paint were restored. The baldacchino, the main altars, the side altars, and the statues were cleaned and restored. This was possible due to a gift from a parishioner.

== The church building ==
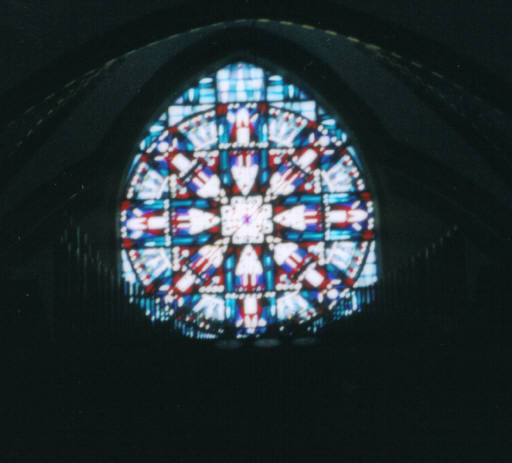
The Rose Window

The basilica features Ruskinian Gothic Revival architecture. The two steeples are 212 feet (65 m) tall with 14 feet (4.3 m) crosses that cap the spires. This helps make the church visible from miles away across the rolling lightly forested farmland. Pilots often use these steeples as landmarks during flights. The church is a rectangular structure that measures 174.5 by 70 feet (53.2 by 21.3 m) and is 76 feet (23 m) high. It has a polygonal apse on its west side. The interior includes columns and vaulted ceilings. The church has a seating capacity of about 1,000 people. There are about 5,000 people total in the parish.

The church has 64 large cathedral glass windows. There are two notable windows in the church. The first is the rose window above the entrances to the church, installed in 1959. It replaced a conventional church window on which the framework had become deteriorated. An Indian motif was selected in recognition of many local Indian tribes that inhabited this area 150 years earlier.

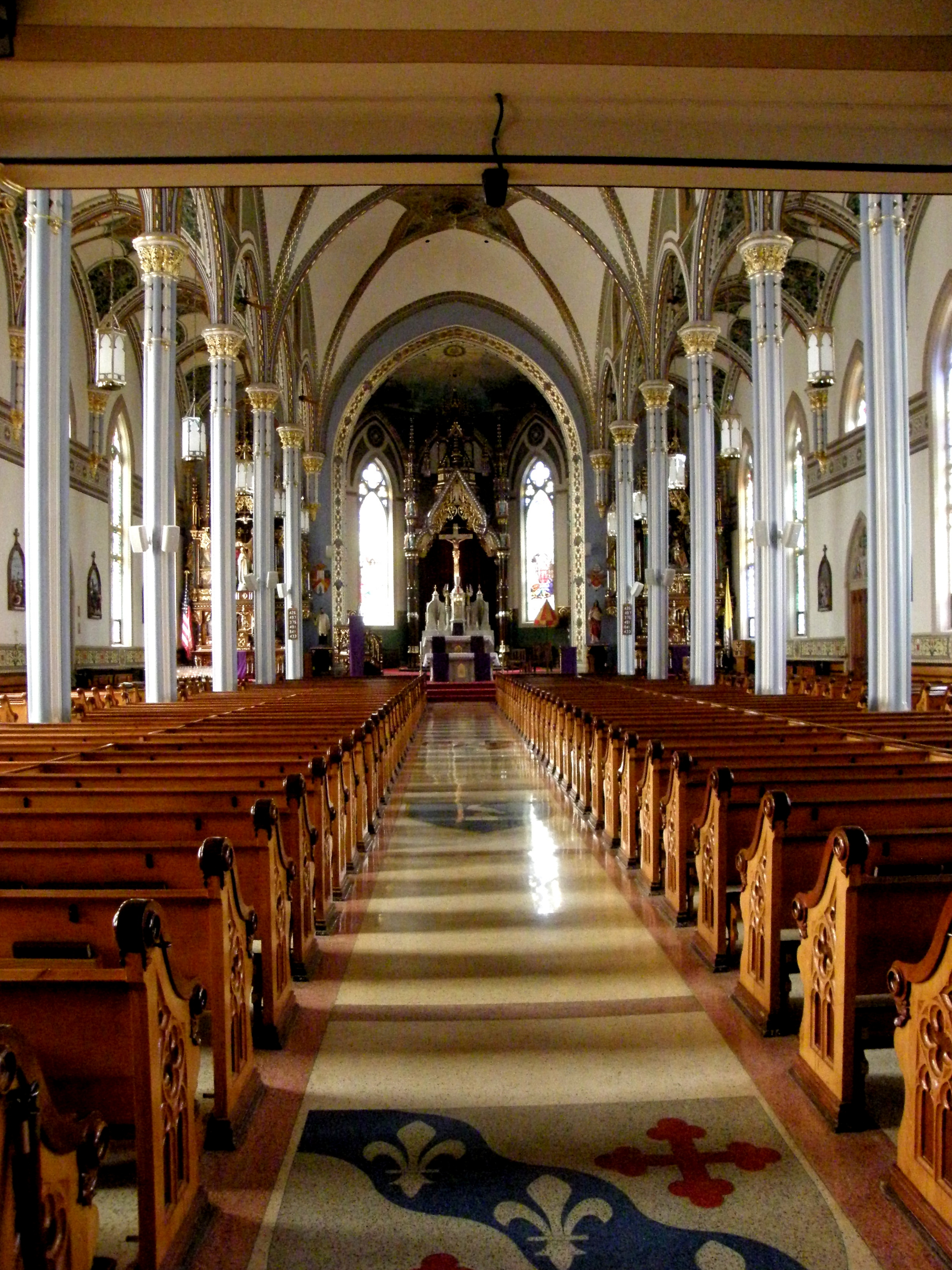
The nave looking to ward the altar.

The two side altars were designed by J. E. Brielmaier and erected by the Dubuque Altar Company in March 1897. They measure 36 by 15 feet (11.0 by 4.6 m) and are made of butternut. Mary's altar is called "The Coronation" and Joseph's is called "The Holy Family". Brielmaier also designed the butternut baldacchino over the high altar, which is carved Italian marble by the Milwaukee Monument Company, and they were both installed in December 1897. The baldacchino rises to a height of 52 feet (16 m). The wood carved crucifix above the altar was created in 1873 for the original church. The ornate pulpit from 1906 sits to the left of the altar. Also carved in butternut, it was originally located in the nave and had a carved canopy over it. It was moved into chancel in the 1940s and the canopy was removed at that time. The images carved on the pulpit include the Evangelists: Matthew, Mark, Luke, John as well as the Apostles Peter and Paul; and five Doctors of the Western Church: Ambrose, Jerome, Gregory, Augustine and Thomas Aquinas. A free-standing altar was commissioned from the John C. Kaiser Company of Dubuque and created by Fritz Ganshirt. It was installed in 1973.

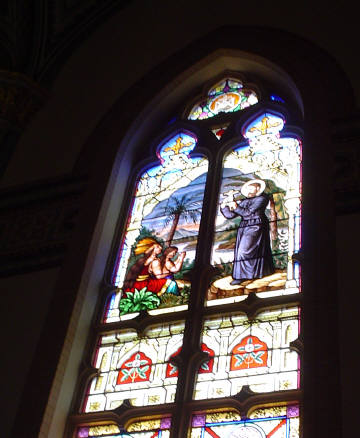
St. Francis Xavier ministering to the Indians

Above the high altar is a large central painting of the heavenly liturgy mentioned in Revelations 5: the Adoration of the Mystical Lamb of God. To the right are images of the prophets that include John the Baptist, Noah holding the ark, David playing the harp, Melichisedech holding bread and wine, Moses holding the Ten Commandments, and the Three Magi with their gifts. The image of Msgr. M.M. Hoffmann, the pastor when the church was named a basilica, was added in 2000. To the left are images of saints that include the Blessed Virgin Mary, George with a spear, Lawrence with a gridiron, Stephen with stones, Joseph with a lily, Rose of Lima with a crown of roses, Peter with keys, Paul with sword, Henry the King, Boniface, Francis of Assisi, Francis Xavier, Catherine, and Cecilia playing the organ. An image of the Rev. George W. Heer, who was pastor of the parish when the original painting was done, was added during its restoration.

The Stations of the Cross that line side walls were installed in 1959. The plaster bas reliefs replaced the original set that dated from 1870, which had deteriorated.

The images on the center aisle were installed in 1998. It is the first floor of its kind in the United States to combine "epoxy based terrazzo, and computer generated water jet laser cutting for the brass molds." The symbols in the floor include the coats of arms of the Archdiocese of Dubuque, Pope Pius XII, the basilica, and the papal insignia of the tiara and keys.

In 1971 a new organ was installed in the church that replaced the basilica's original pipe organ, which dated from 1913. The 27-rank organ located in the rear gallery is a custom made instrument designed for the basilica by the Wicks Organ Company of Highland, Illinois. The organ was designed keeping in mind the size of the church and the acoustical qualities of the building. In 2019 the organ was rebuilt and expanded by the Reuter Organ Company, giving the organ a new facade of speaking pipes and adding the choir division that had been left out of the 1971 organ. Additionally due to damage from a lightning strike shortly after the 1971 organ was installed, the organ was experiencing issues with its electrical system. This electrical system was replaced with a fiber optic system which is much more resistant to electrical issues than the older organ.

Because one of the roles of the basilica is to serve as the pope's church in the event he would visit the area, the church features a special bell called a tintinnabulum, and an umbrella called an umbraculum.
