= Ente Scambi Coloniali Internazionali =

Italian model kit manufacturer

ESCI S.p.A.
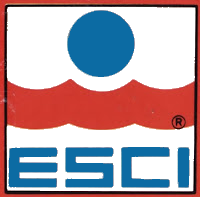
- Company type: Private
- Industry: Entertainment
- Founded: 1930s
- Founder: Moses Agiman
- Defunct: 1993; 33 years ago
- Headquarters: Cernusco sul Naviglio, Metropolitan City of Milan, Italy
- Area served: Worldwide
- Key people: Daniele Agiman; Dino Coppola; Franco Baldrighi
- Products: Plastic model cars, airplanes
- Parent: Ertl (1987–93)

Ente Scambi Coloniali Internazionali (Colonial Trade Exchange), mostly known for its acronym ESCI, was an Italian scale model kit manufacturer based in Lombardy. Established in 1930, the company produced model cars and model aircraft.

In 1987, it merged to American manufacturer Ertl to become "ESCI-ERTL SpA", remaining in the business until it was liquidated in 1993.

== History ==
ESCI was originally founded in the 1930s by Moses Agiman (b. Benghazi 1896), an Italian merchant of Libyan and Jewish descent. Initially, the company dealt in import/export between Italy and its African colonies. The advent of racial laws during World War II forced the owner to move to Switzerland with his family until the end of the conflict. Returning to Italy, he resumed business activities undertaken previously and expanded, thanks to the economic boom of the 1960s. In the mid-1960s, Agiman entered the scale model market with the first imports of kits from Japan. The business expanded, and at the end of the decade, alongside the founder's son, Daniele Agiman (successor of his father), joined two new partners: Dino Coppola and Franco Baldrighi. E.S.C.I. became "ESCI Modellistica snc.", located in the industrial area of Via Torino in Cernusco sul Naviglio, MiIan.

Compared to other modelling companies at the time, ESCI was primarily a sales office, able to make contacts and cultivate global business. The production division of the company relied on third-party companies and technicians, who commissioned craftsmen, moulds, and sometimes production and packaging. The company's production was diverse and ranged from talented producers in the industry as Italaerei (today Italeri), Otaki, LS, as well as local artisans. Thus, production ranged from moulds of high-level kits to less detailed moulds with raised panel lines.

Real production began in 1972, with the launch of additional decal sheets which allowed modellers to finish the kits in different liveries for the first time. Each decal sheet was packaged in a plastic bag with a detailed instruction sheet containing eight different profile colors, and a third sheet with a detailed explanation of the history and origins of each insignia. The product achieved considerable commercial success, and ESCI was able to invest its new resources in 1:9 scale motorcycle kits. The first plastic production kit was the BMW R75 with sidecar, followed by the Harley-Davidson WLA, and the Zündapp KS750, all hand-crafted by the famous creator master modeller Manuel Olive Sans. These were followed by the Sd.Kfz. 2 Kettenkrad and Volkswagen Kübelwagen. A partnership with Italerei was established for production of the moulds, which could not advertise this collaboration on the boxes, as they were formal rivals in the kit market. The relationship between ESCI and Italeri began in full friendship, even if later relations deteriorated for competitive reasons.

The growing model kit industry led the company to start a new armour series, using the atypical and new 1:72 scale, usually used for planes, in contrast to the standard 1:76 scale. The dimensional consistency with the aircraft scale made their armour scale choice popular, thanks to a high level of quality that allowed ESCI to become one of the leading manufacturers in the kit market. Sales success led to the production of new moulds, and in 1977, ESCI launched a successful series of modern aircraft in 1:48 scale, followed by a successful series in 1:72 scale. Between 1977 and 1983 the production of moulds increased further, and the company inaugurated a practice followed widely used by all producers: several boxes of the same subject were released with new decal sheets or variants and new box art. Together with models of aircraft, armoured vehicles, and motorcycles, were also models of trucks, cars, trains, ships, and figures. The discerning choice of subjects was the basis of some commercial success of the company. A representative case was the mould of the Panavia Tornado in 1:48 scale, done in 1975 when the prototype of the real aircraft was undergoing its initial flight tests. The Tornado was the most advanced European aircraft of the time. Although lacking detail, the ESCI Tornado remained the only model for this plane in 1:48 for 17 years, becoming also the company's best-seller.

In 1984, ESCI introduced separated track links for AFV model kits. In the same year they also started an innovative product: 1:12 scale cockpits of aircraft such as the F-104 and F-16. The 1985 catalogue, distributed by Ricordi in Milan, shows a redesign of the boxes, with the replacement of the predominant color white with red on box art. An impressive list of products was offered: 350 kits of aircraft, including 121 subjects (77 in 1:48 scale and 44 in 1:72).

In the mid-1980s, the first signs of market crisis took the modelling industry in a new direction characterized by an increasingly high level in quality of the moulds (mainly the use of emerging technology CAD/CAM); this, combined with advent of the first video games and electronic media quickly shifted the attention of young people. The combination of financing pressures and maintenance of ESCI's impressive catalogue required substantial investments that led to the entrance of a new partner who could give new life to the company. In 1987, the three partners gave a majority stake in the company to Ertl, the American distributor of ESCI kits at the time. The catalogue of 1991 shows a radical downsizing of products, bringing the number of kits to 290. 100 of these were aeroplanes (22 in 1:48 scale and 75 in 1:72 scale).

At the end of 1991 CEO Dino Coppola left the company with some employees to found the "CDC-Collector Armour Ltd.", a company specializing in the production of die cast cars, armoured vehicles, and aircraft, that would be in business until 2001. In 1993, ESCI-ERTL SpA was finally liquidated. Some of the moulds moved to Central America, and others ended up in areas that have become conflict zones, and therefore difficult to recover for future reissues.

Ertl moved some moulds to the United States to be used by AMT. Ertl decided to release the best products under the AMT logo, leaving the logo ESCI as products of lower quality and intended for larger distribution. Production moved to Tijuana in Mexico, and later in China and was characterized by the use of very soft plastic that degraded assembly of AMT and ESCI kit reissues.

In the 1990s, AMT developed a series of new moulds to model aircraft of World War II. The last official catalog was printed in 1999 by the local Italian distributor, and the few boxes that came to stores went almost completely unnoticed. The same year, economic difficulties at Ertl also led to the sale to Racing Champions. In 2000 the final ESCI moulds were taken by Italeri which today is selling again old production.

== Product lines ==
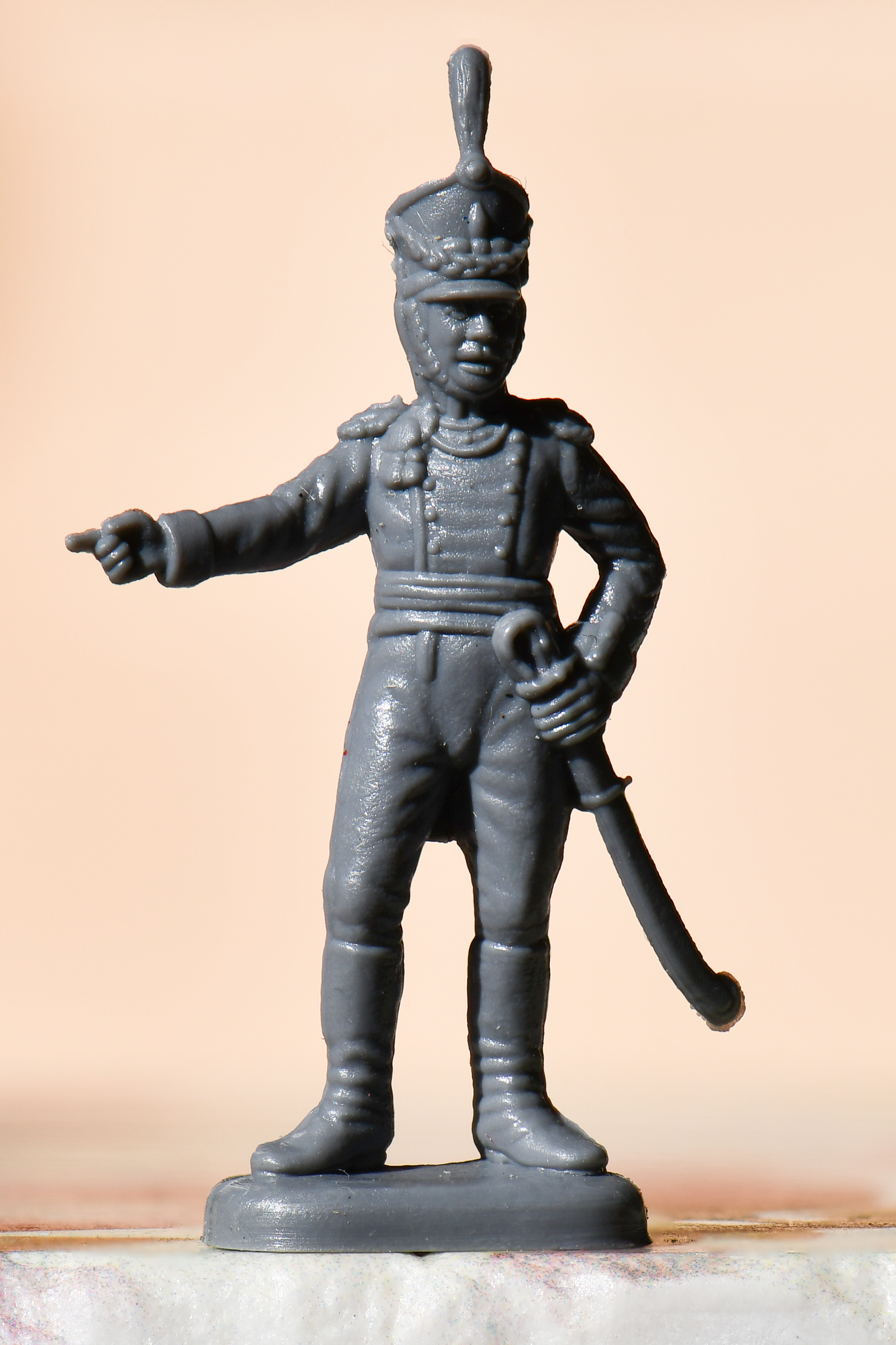
A Napoleonic officer by ESCI

The early ESCI 1:72 scale aircraft offerings, notably the Mirage F-1, F-104, F-15, F-100, F-16 and F-5 and Sea Harrier kits, were extremely accurate at the time of their manufacture. The F-104 and F-15 Eagle kits were later superseded by other competitors like Hasegawa, but ESCI's line of 1:72 scale F-5, F-100D/F, and Sea Harrier remained, until today, arguably among the best scale replicas ever produced in injection moulded plastic. ESCI's 1:72 Sea Harrier kit is quite exceptional because it has continued to be re-released under many other familiar model brands such as Italeri and Revell. ESCI also produced 1/24 scale vehicles. BMW M1, Renault R5, Lamborghini Miura & Countach, Land Rover 109, Mercedes Benz 450 SLC 5.0, Mercedes 230G (G Wagon) including Rally version Paris Dakar, 190e Cosworth, Lancia Beta, Ferrari 250SWB & 512BB. Most were available in race/rally type. The Mk2 Ford Transit and Mk2 Ford Escort were totally unique to ESCI in the scale and have not been manufactured by any other company, although Revell did reproduce the ESCI Ford Escort with different rally liveries, alluding to Revell owning the moulds. ESCI was also noted for releasing 1:72-scale models of Soviet supersonic bombers such as the (Tu-22 and the Tu-22M) during the height of the Cold War era, despite it being a difficult subject to source for accurate information and reference material.

ESCI became noted for their 1:72 military vehicle line as they were one of the first manufacturers to release an extensive and accurate series in that scale.

ESCI's 1:48 aircraft line had below-average accuracy and detailing in spite of the interesting themes (MiG-23, MiG-27) and eye-catching box art. The exception to this are the two crisp models of the famous Henschel ground attack aircraft, the (Hs 123 and the Hs 129). Their World War II line was limited to ground vehicle themes (in 1:72, 1:35, and 1:9 motorbikes). Also several 1:24 cars (factory stock and motorsport) were available with high-finish details.
